= New Yorkers in journalism =

New York City has been called the media capital of the world. Many journalists work in Manhattan, reporting about American and international business, entertainment and sports, and New York metropolitan area-related matters.

New Yorkers in journalism
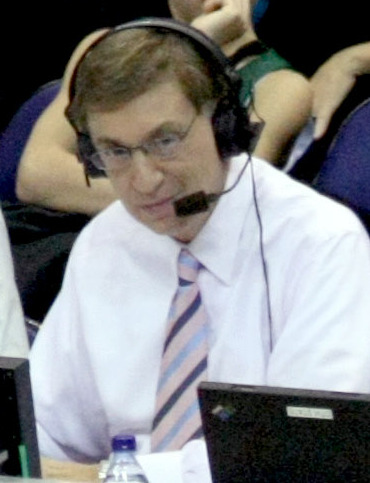
Marv Albert

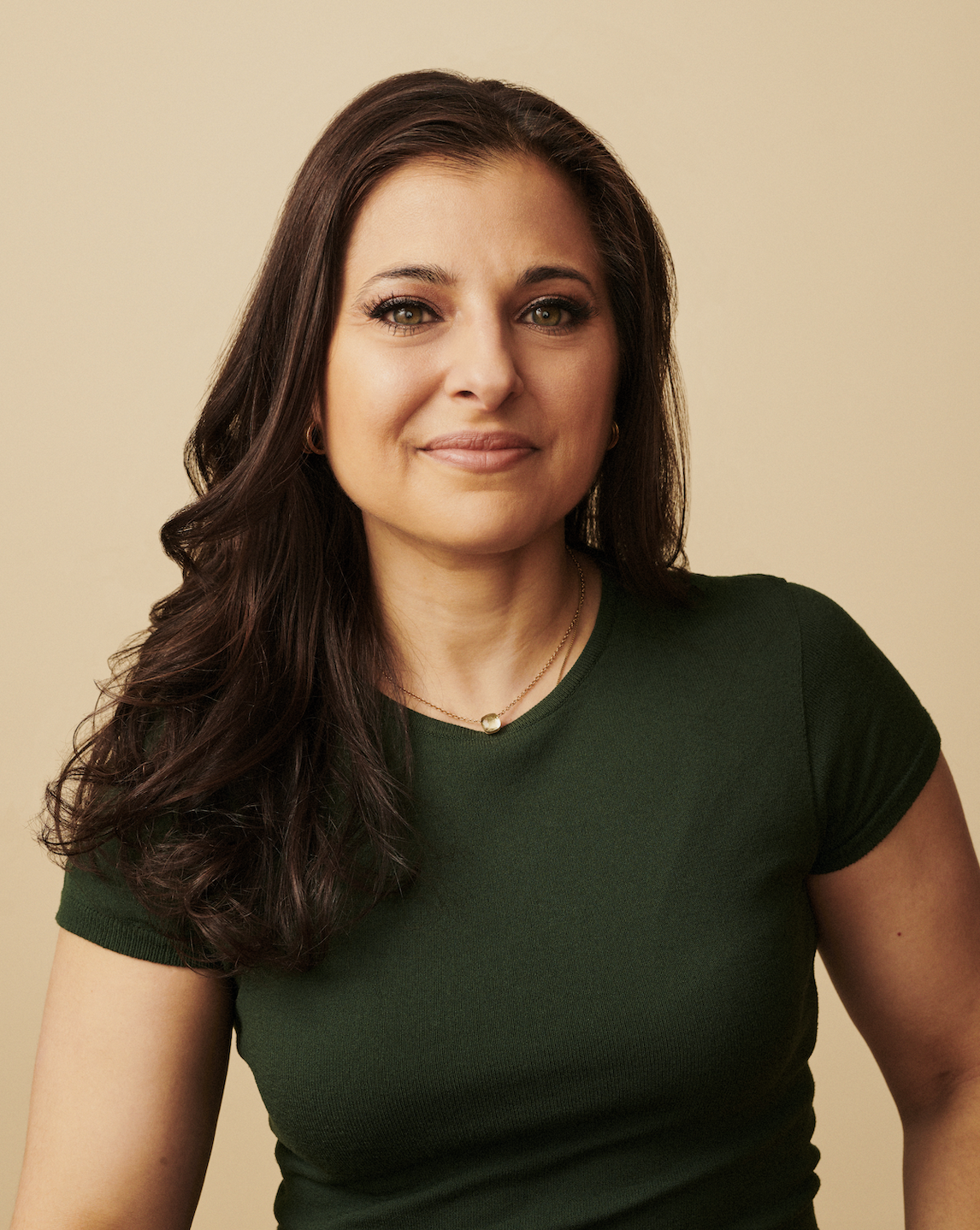
Cristina Alesci

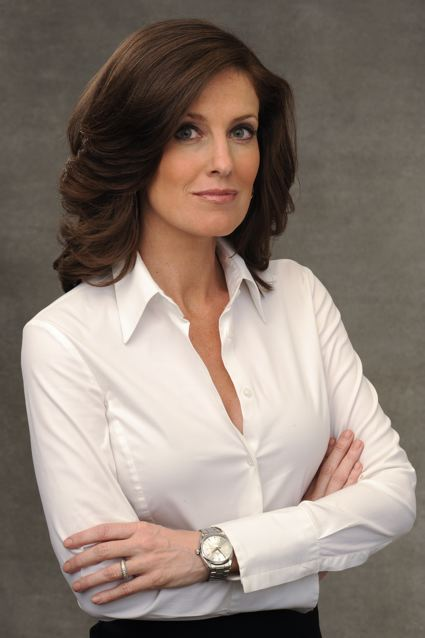
Sharyn Alfonsi

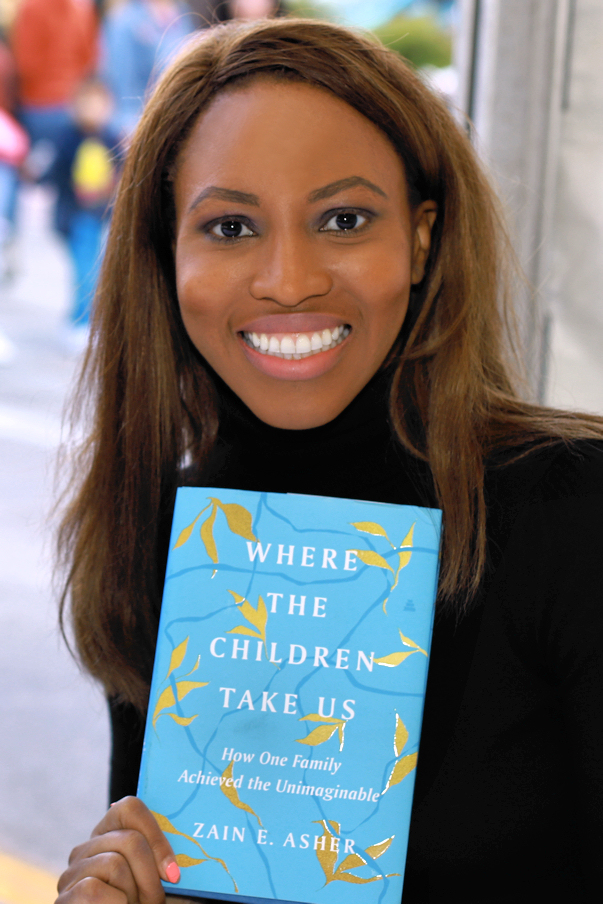
Zain Asher

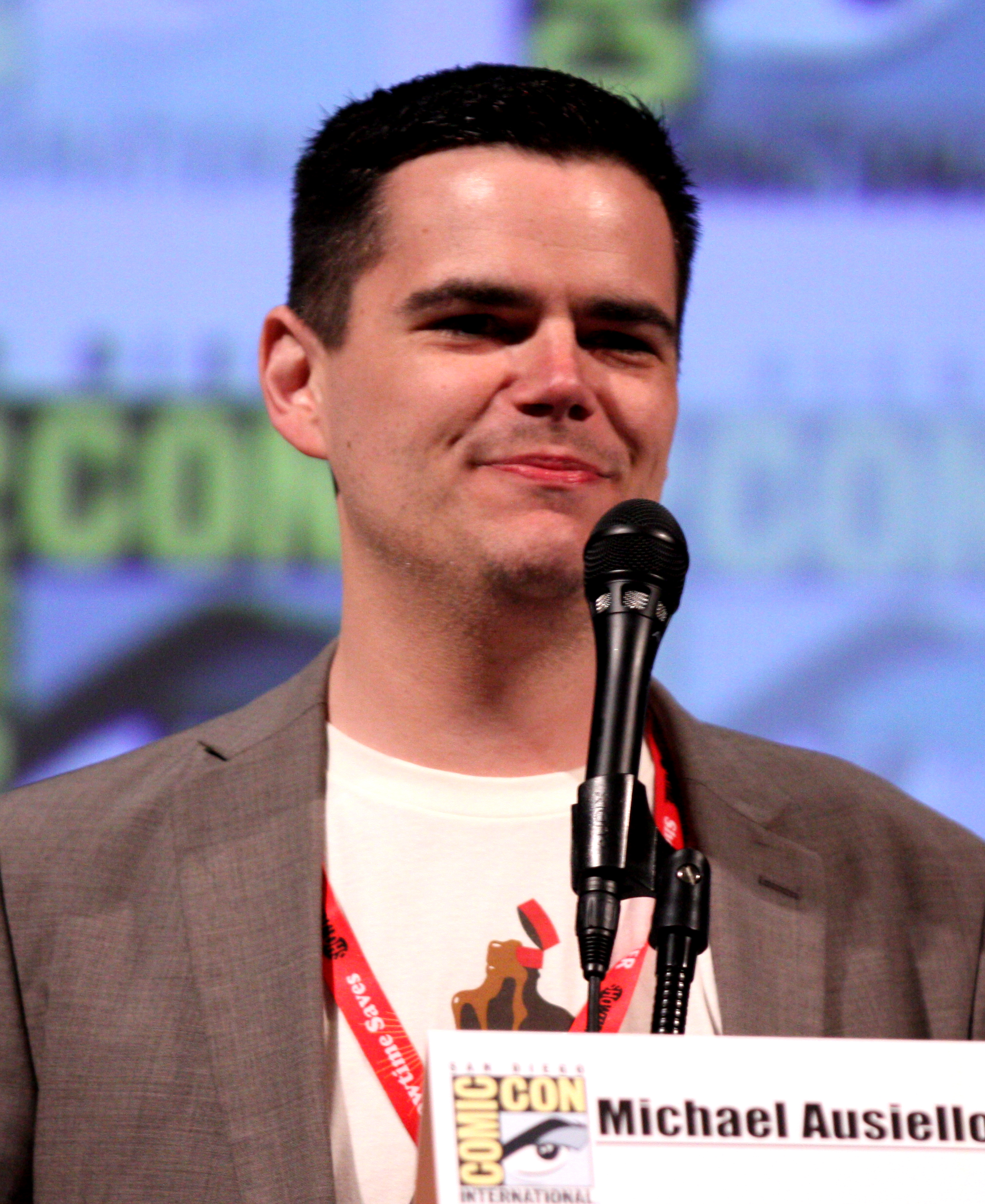
Michael Ausiello

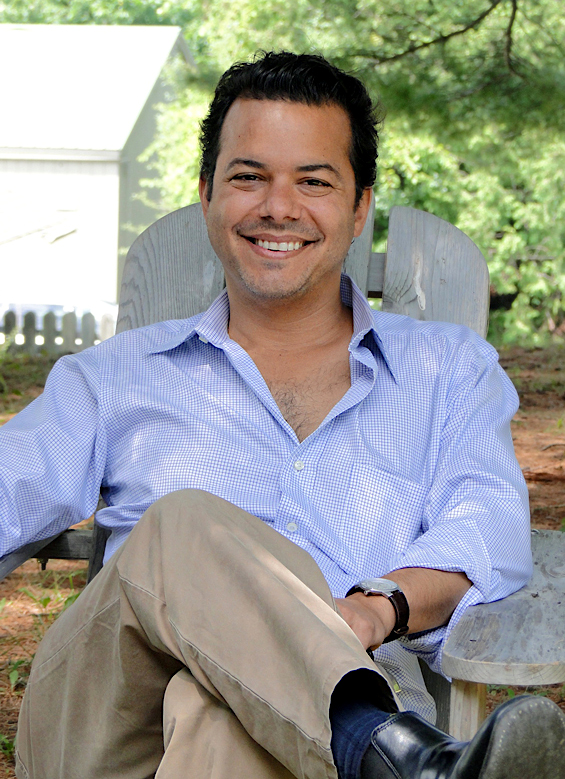
John Avlon

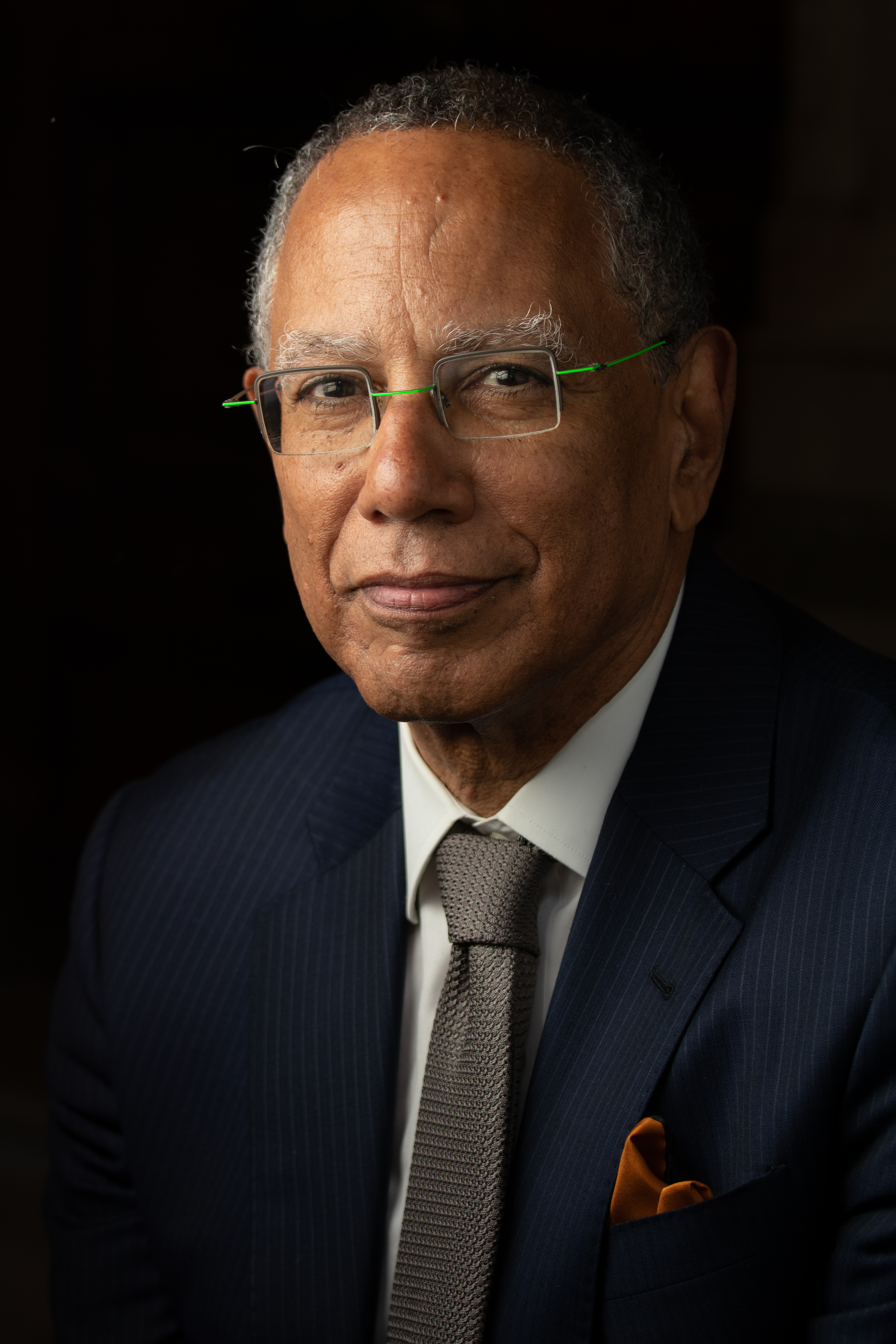
Dean Baquet

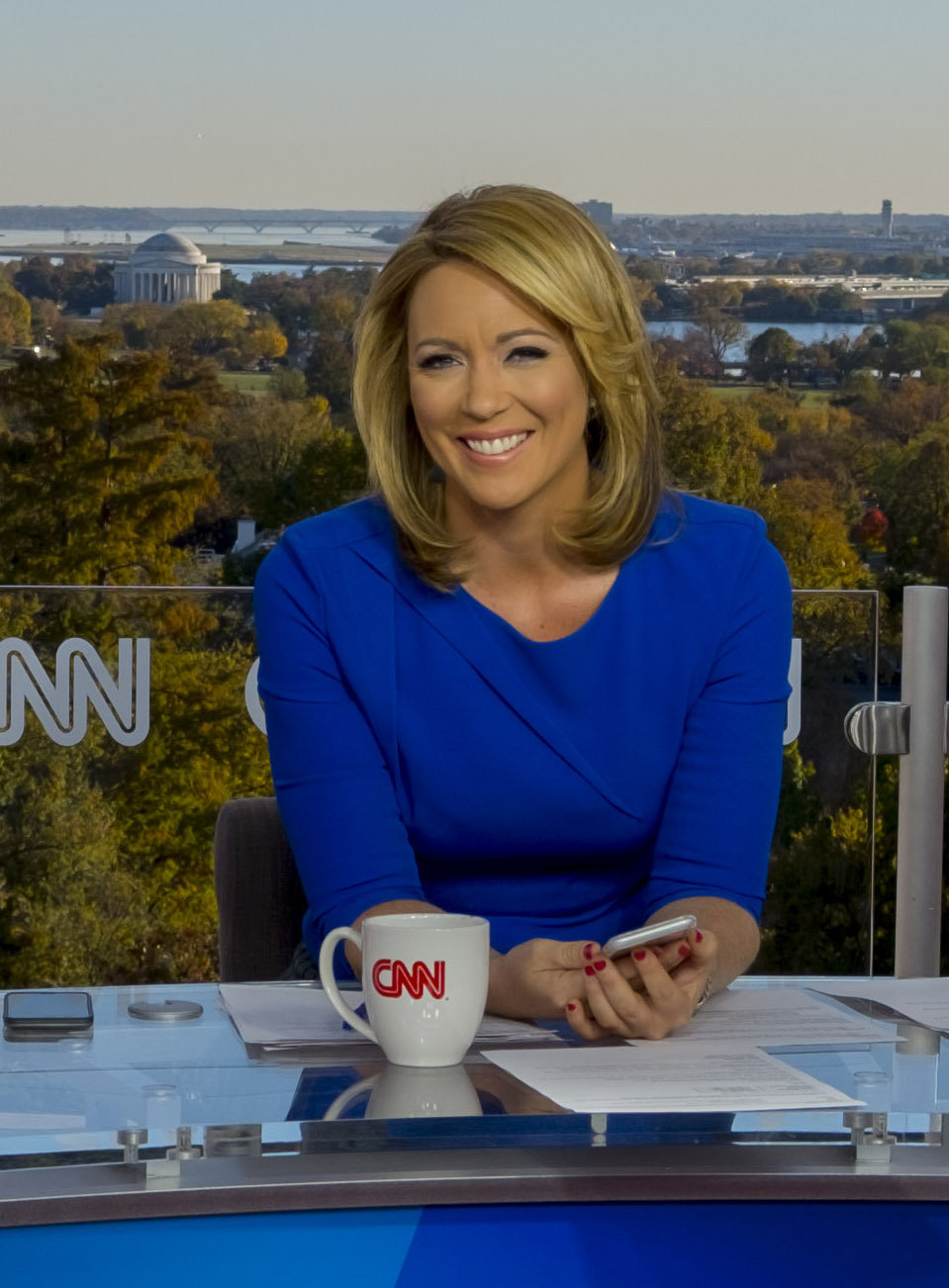
Brooke Baldwin

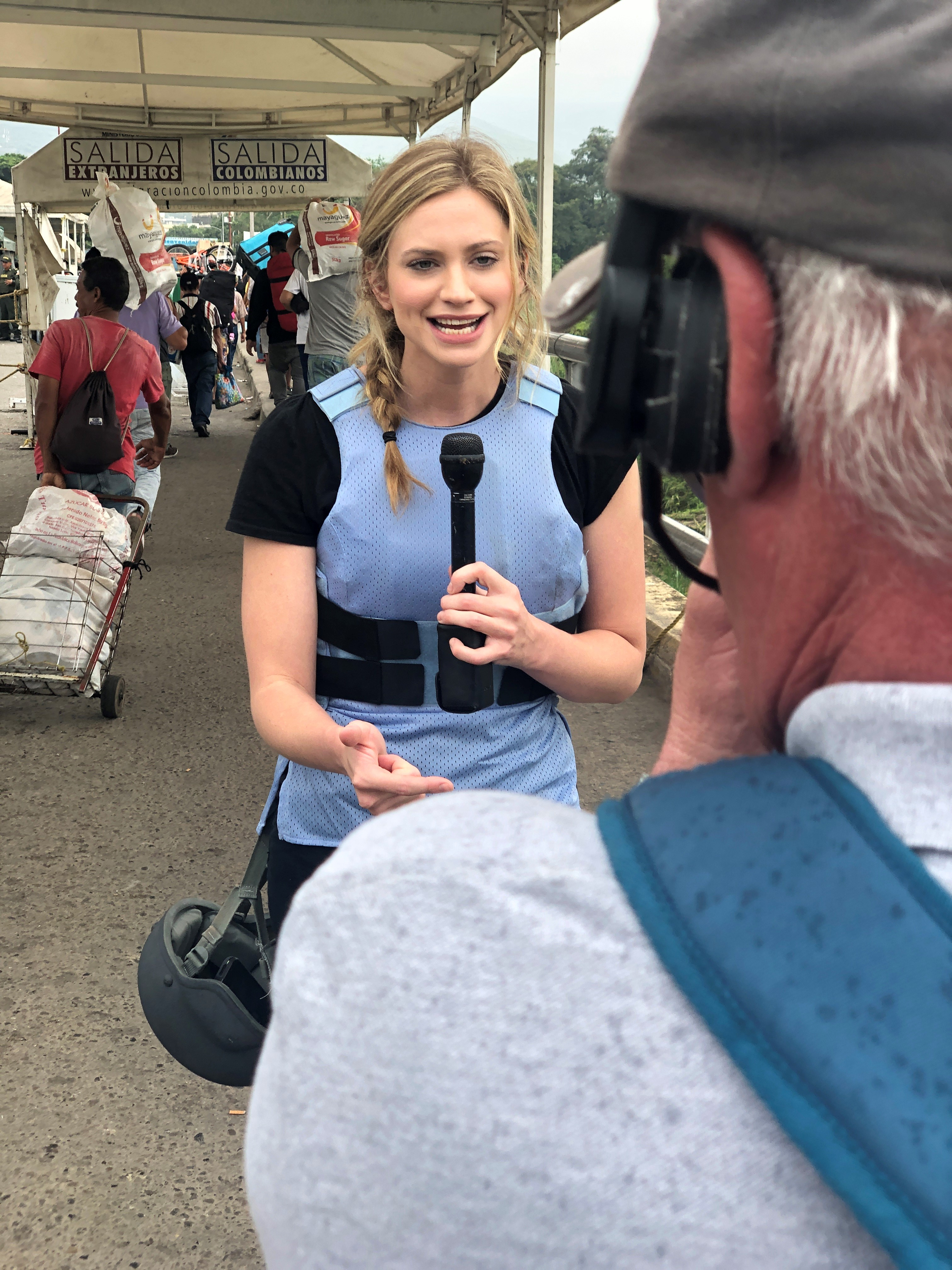
Ellison Barber

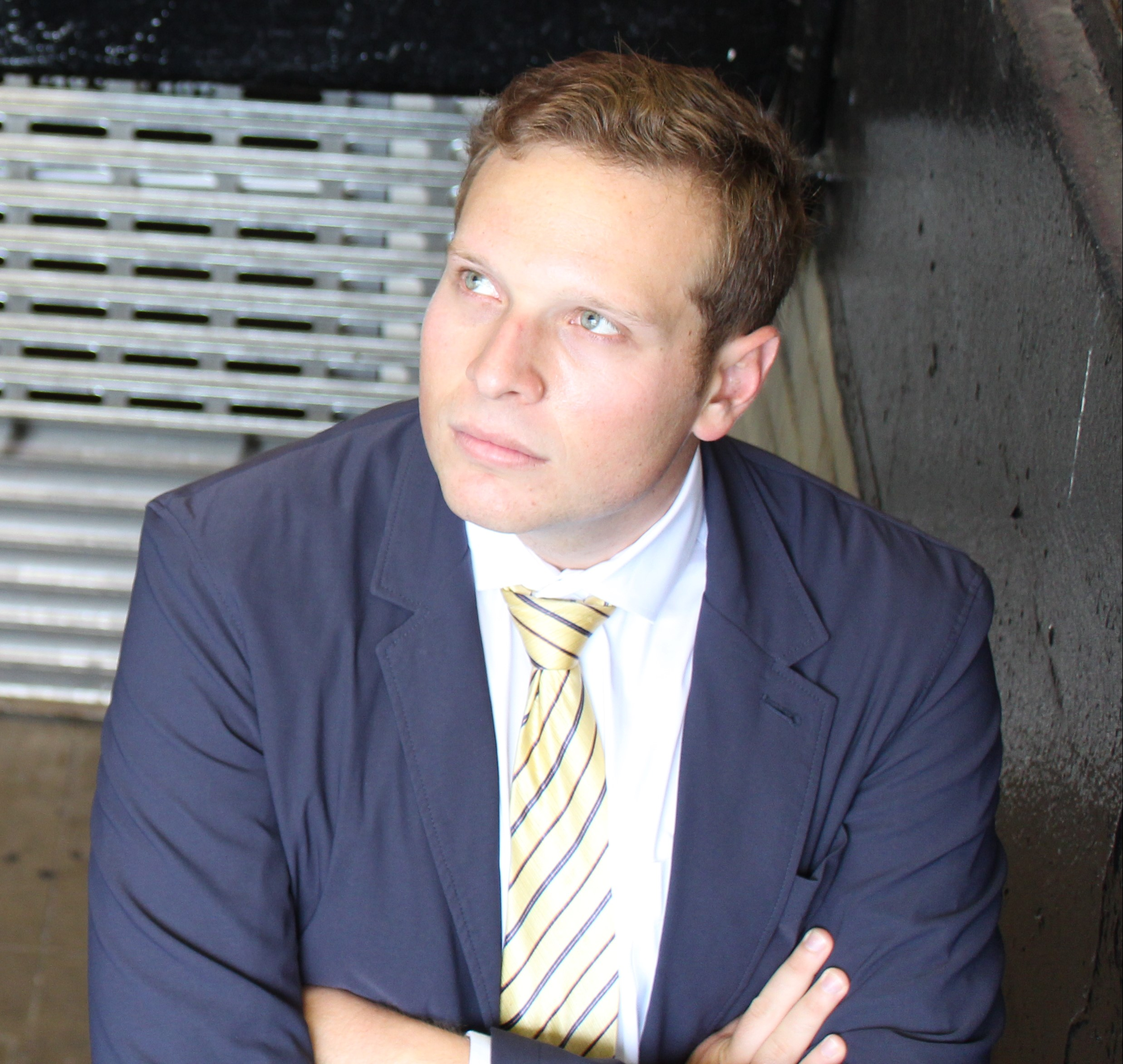
Ross Barkan

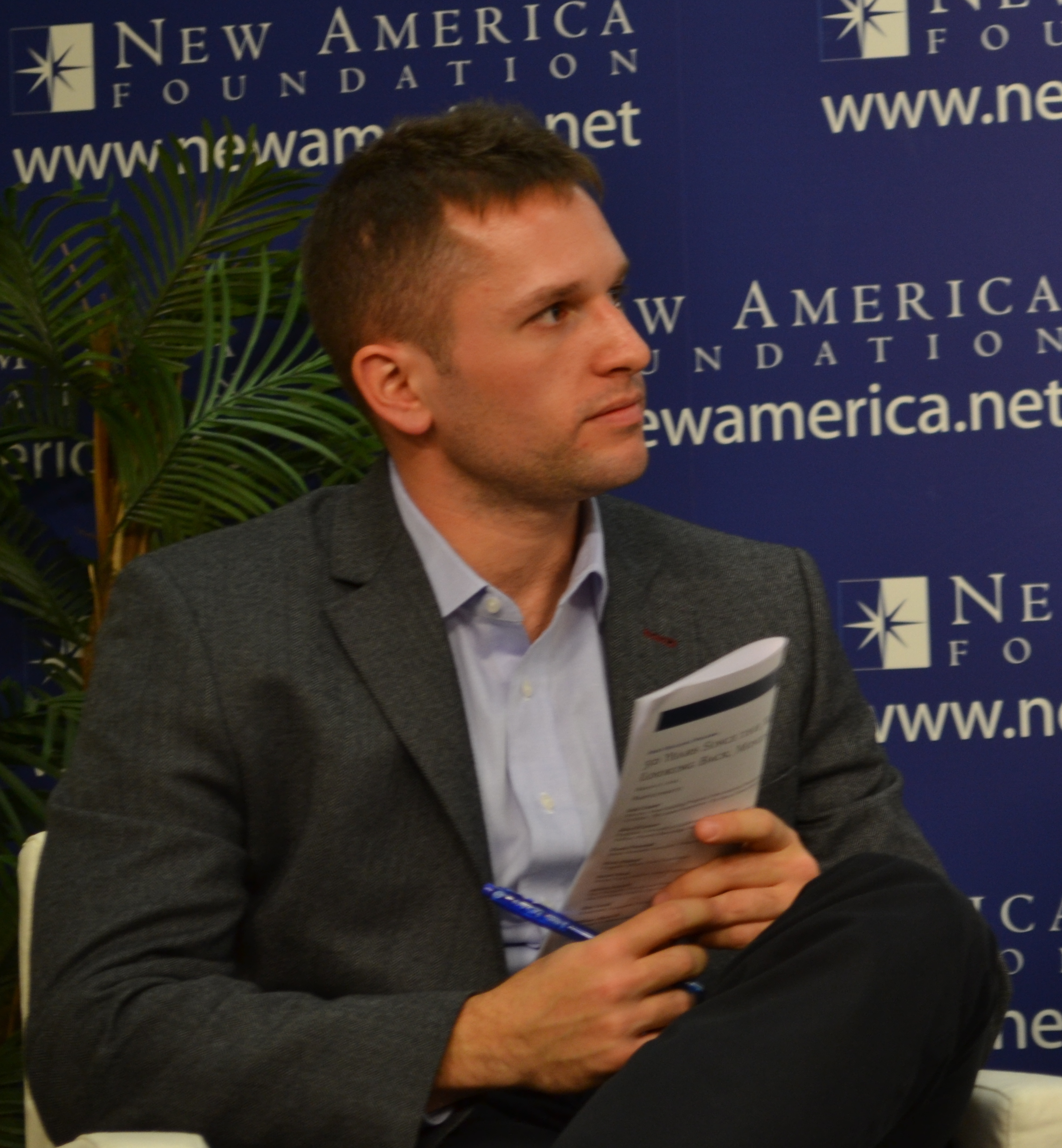
Josh Barro

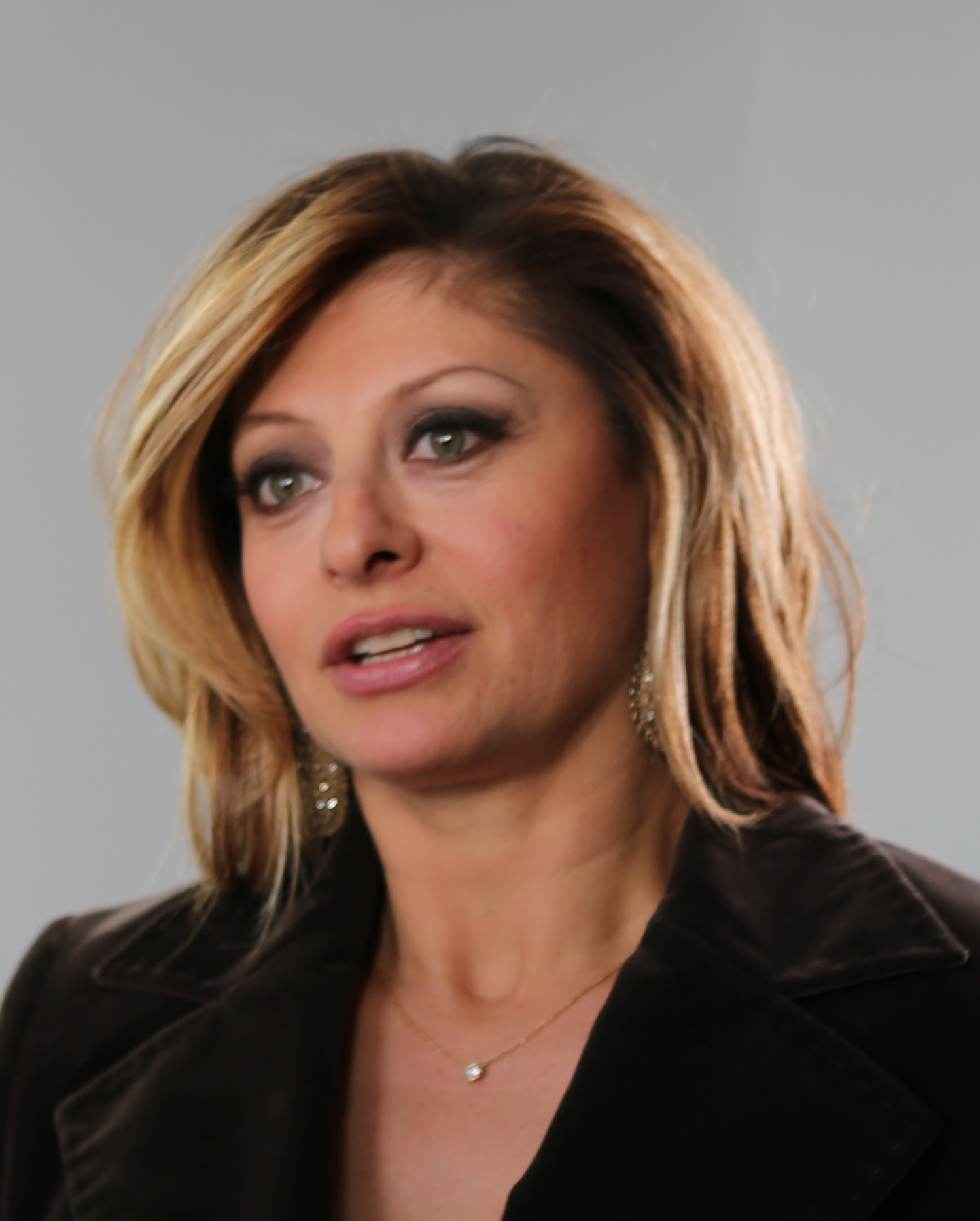
Maria Bartiromo

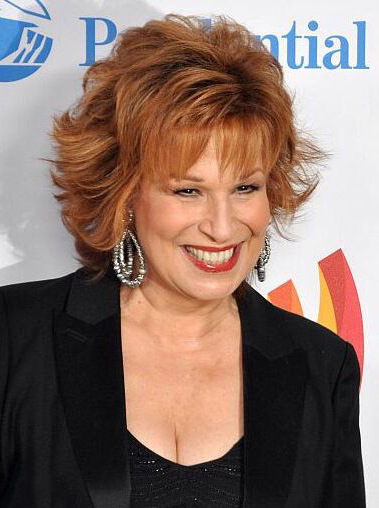
Joy Behar

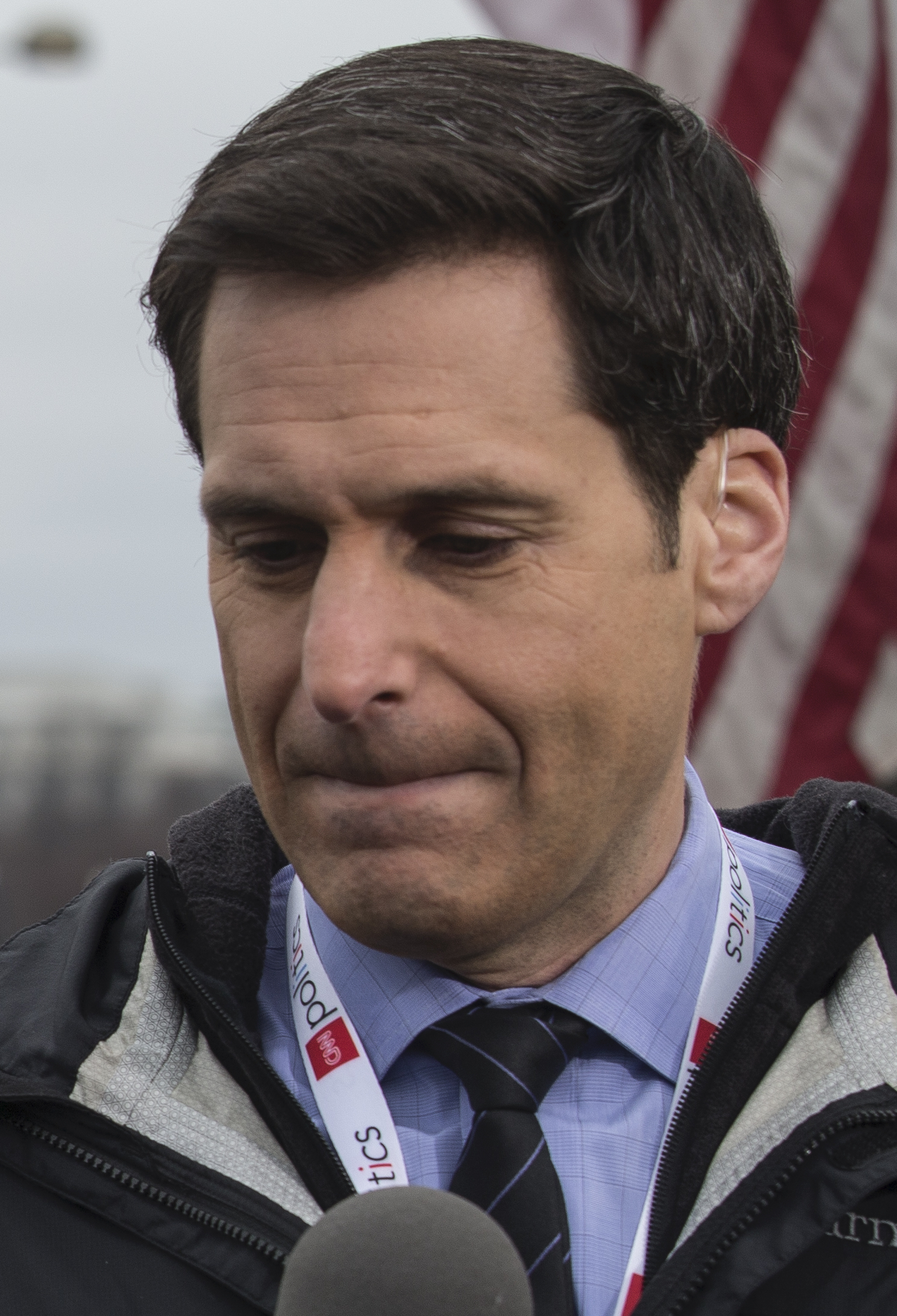
John Berman

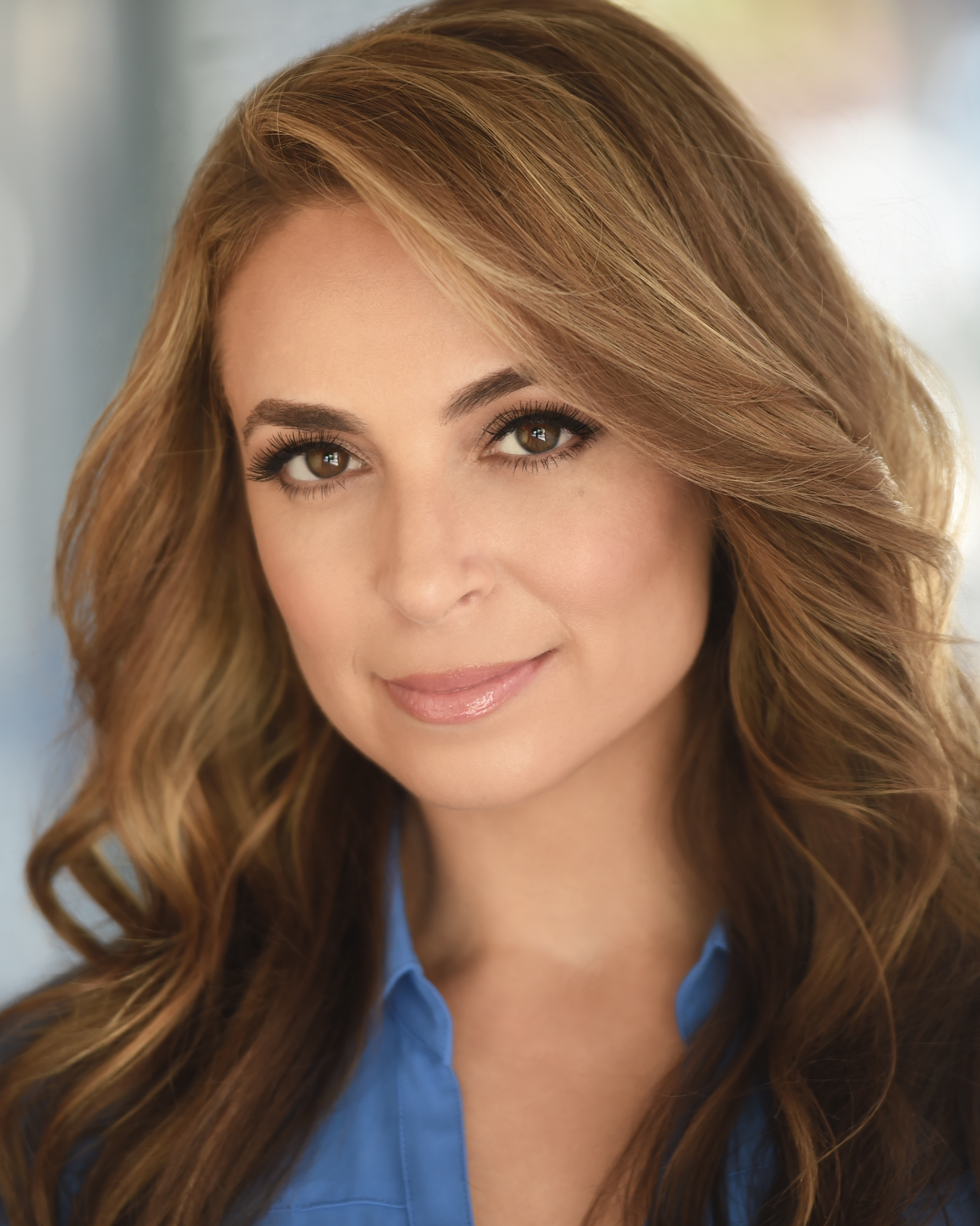
Jedediah Bila

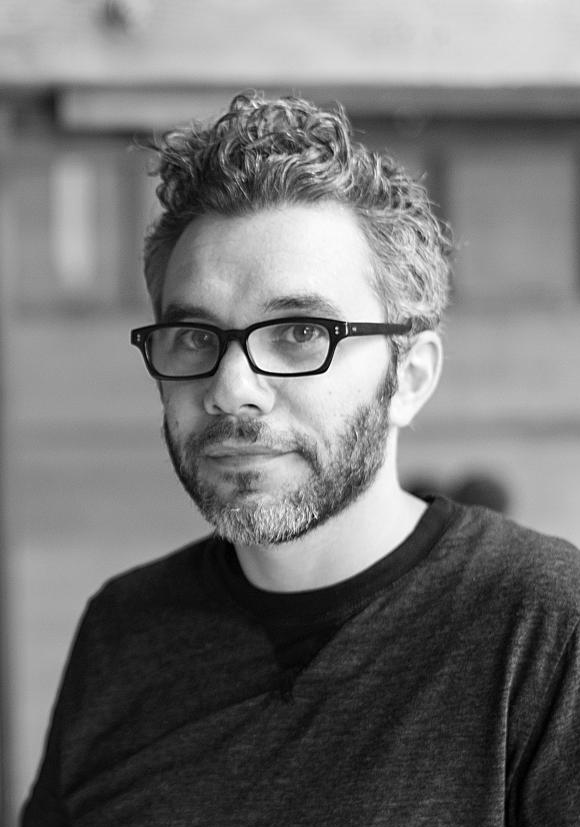
Nick Bilton

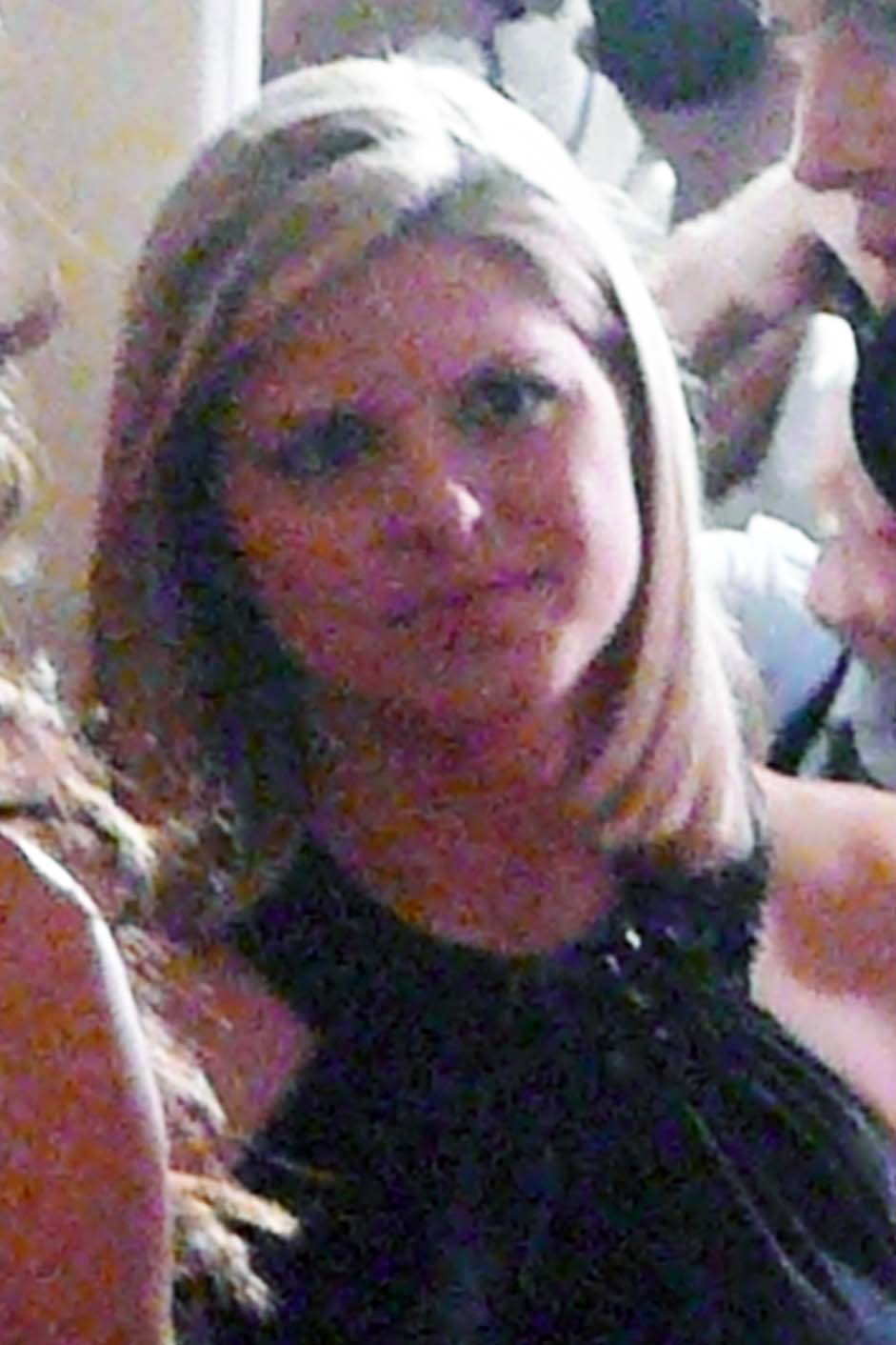
Kate Bolduan

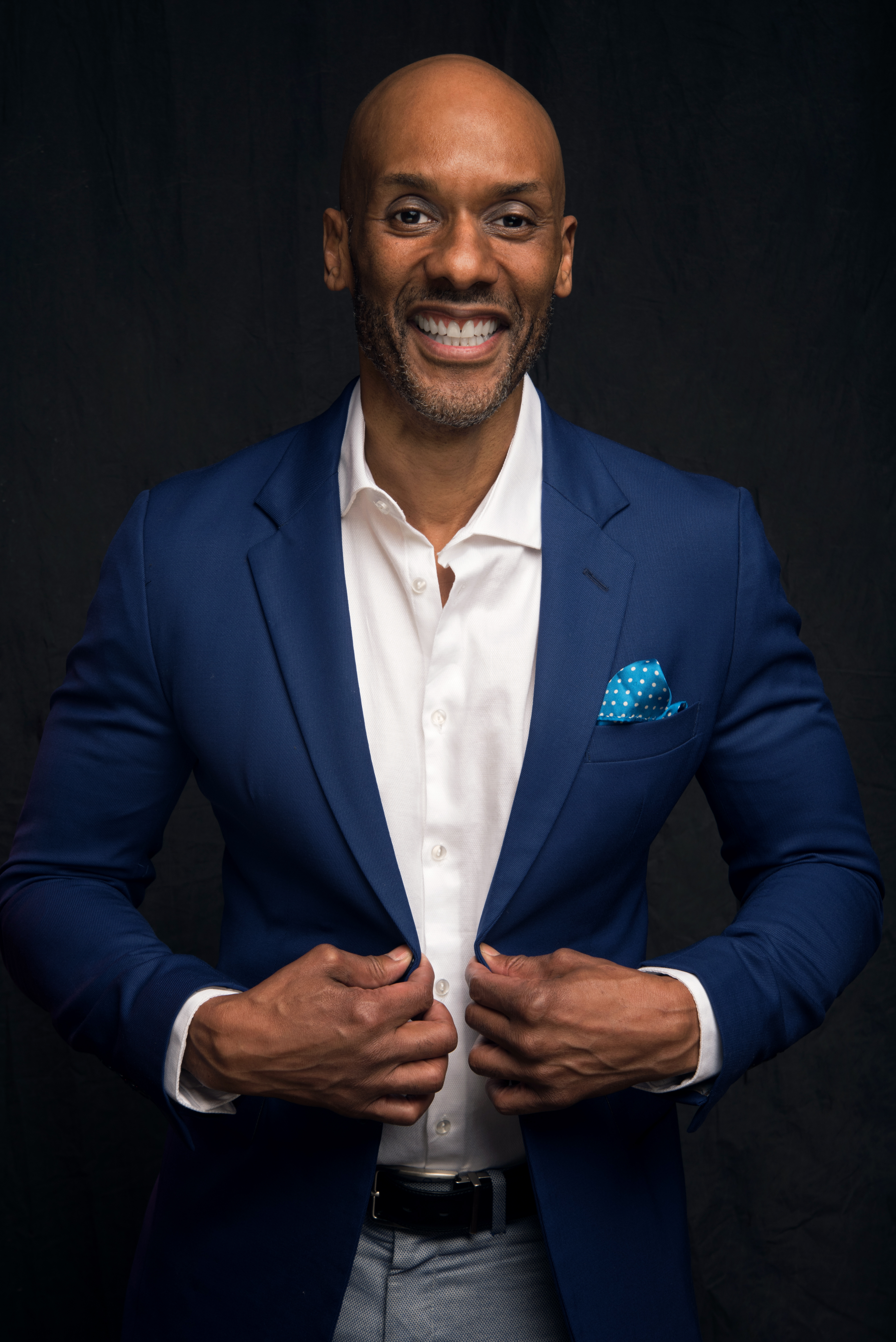
Keith Boykin

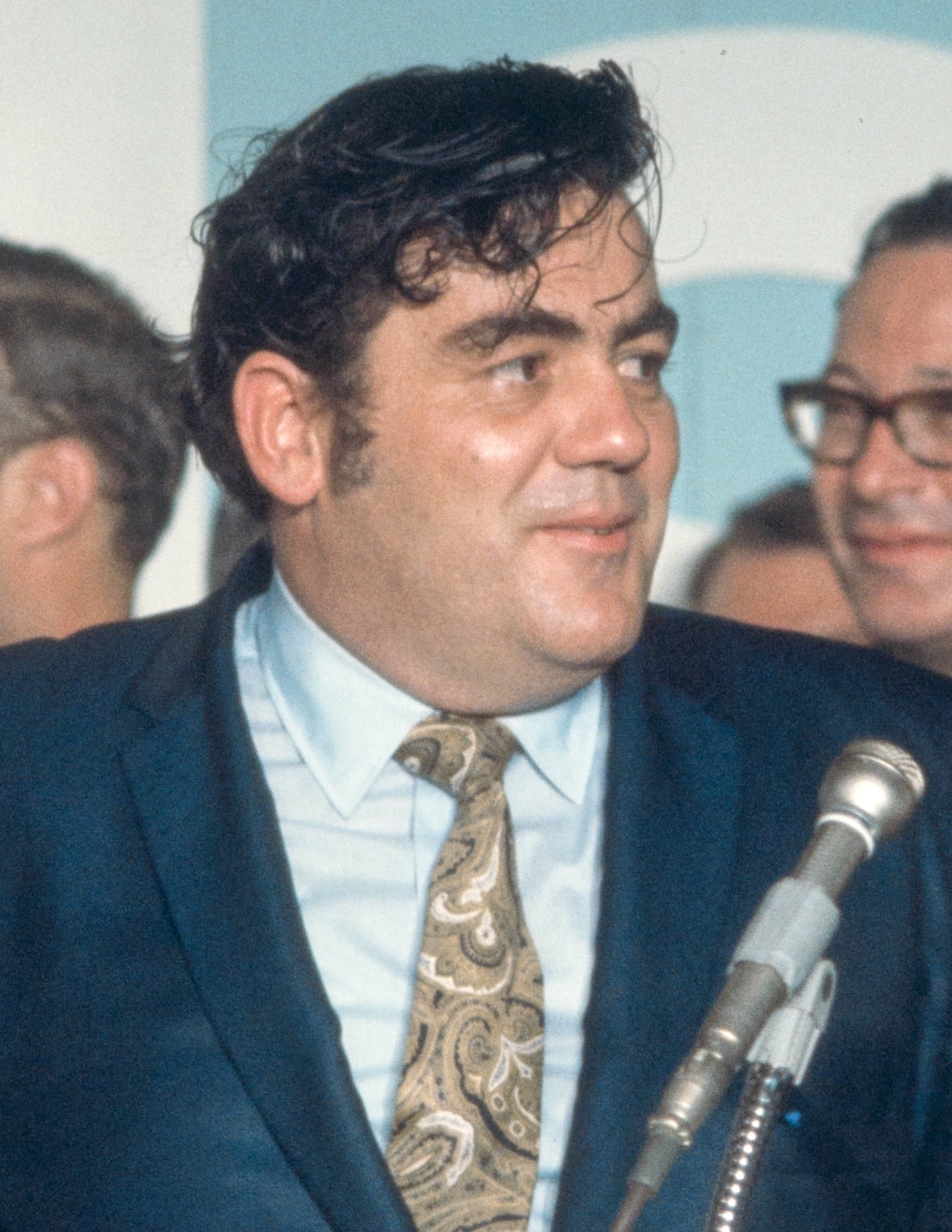
Jimmy Breslin

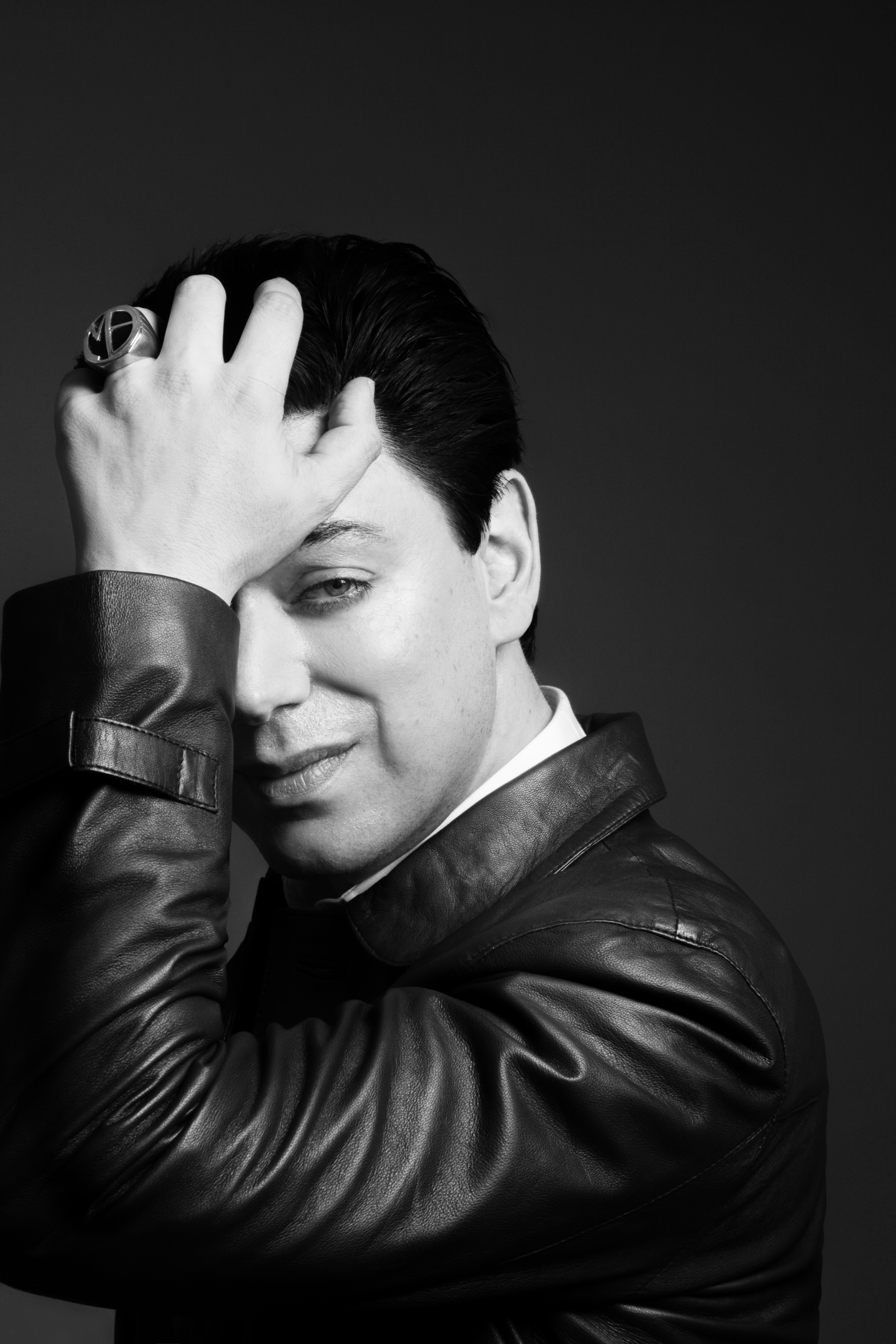
Malan Breton

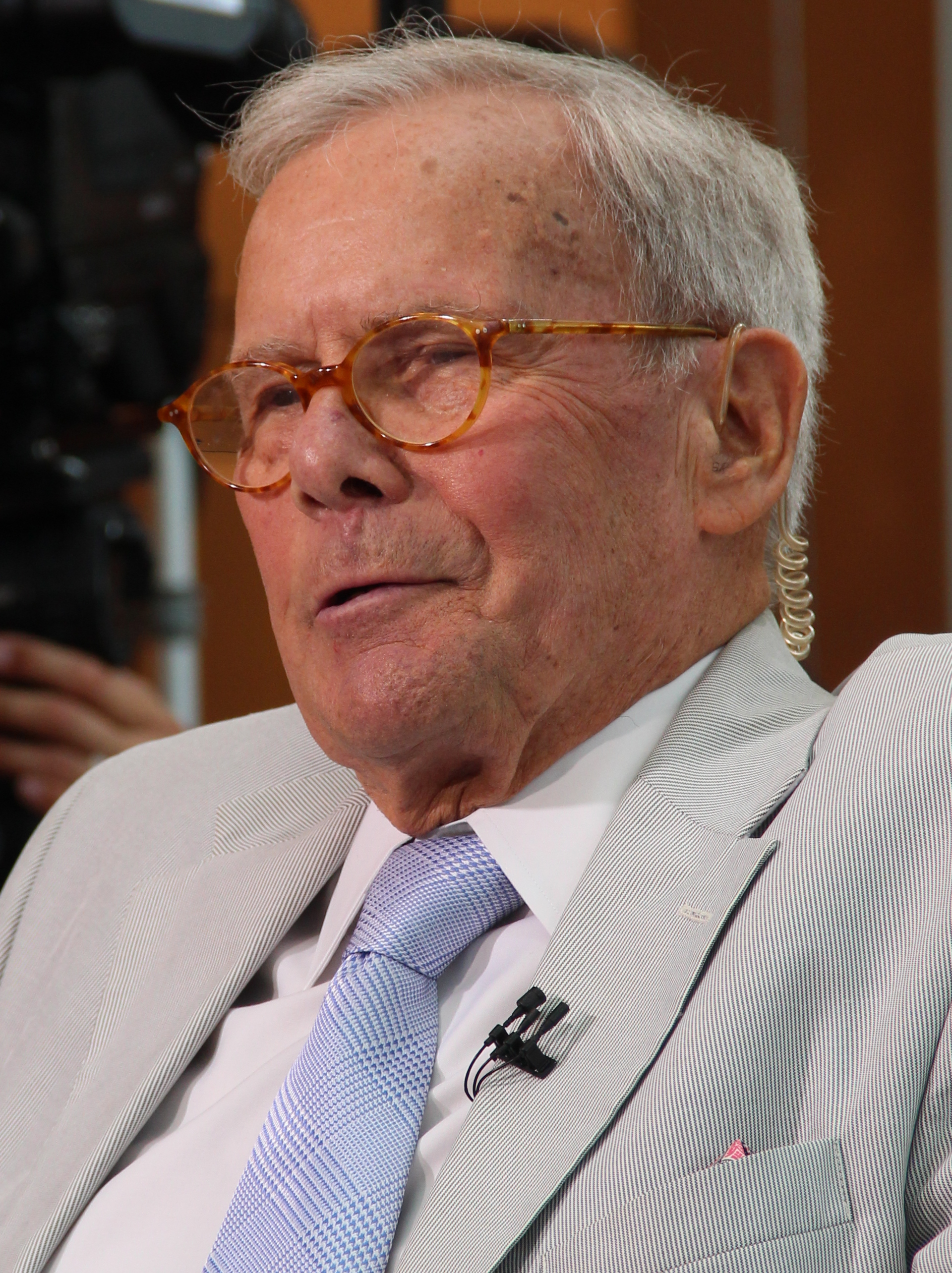
Tom Brokaw

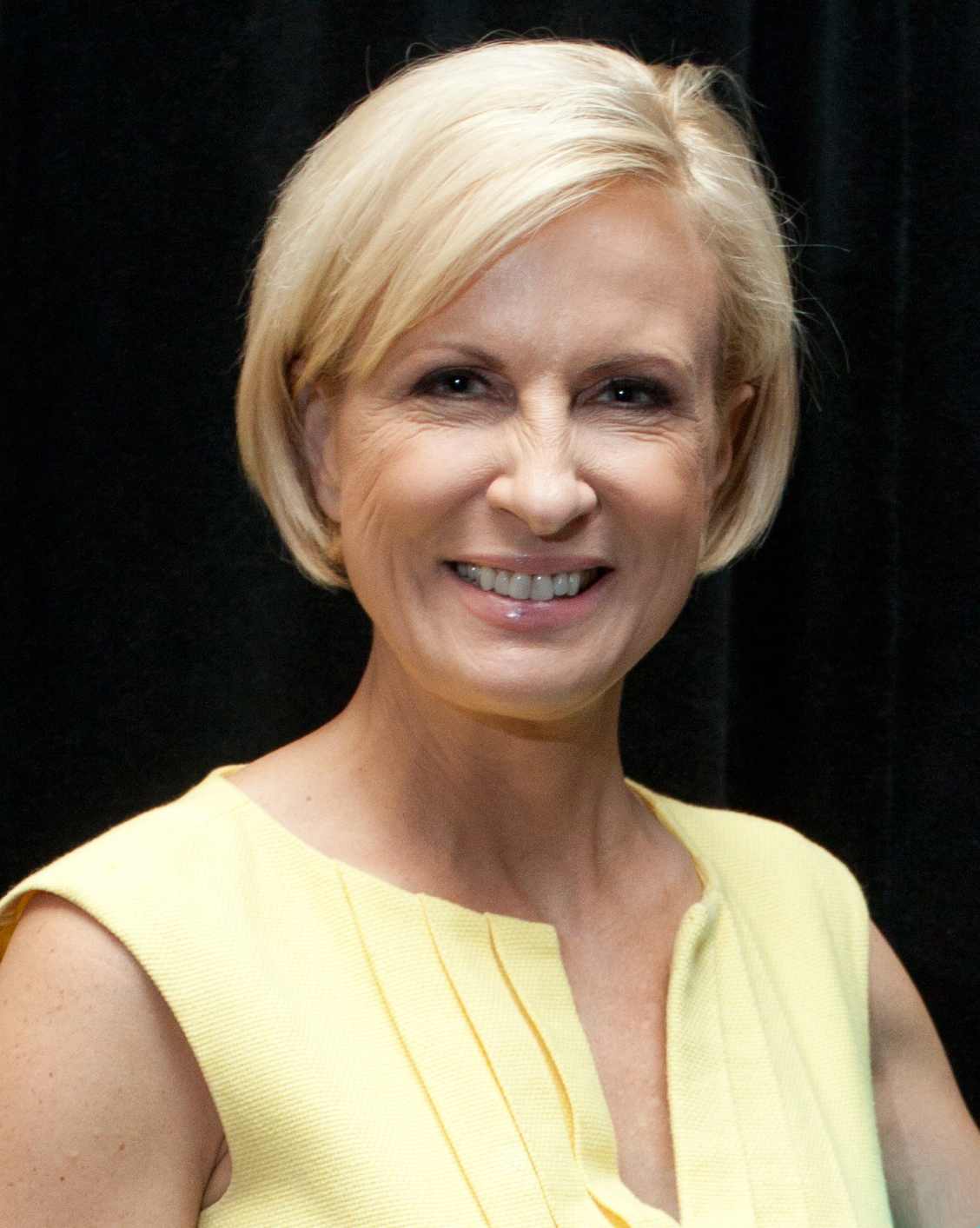
Mika Brzezinski

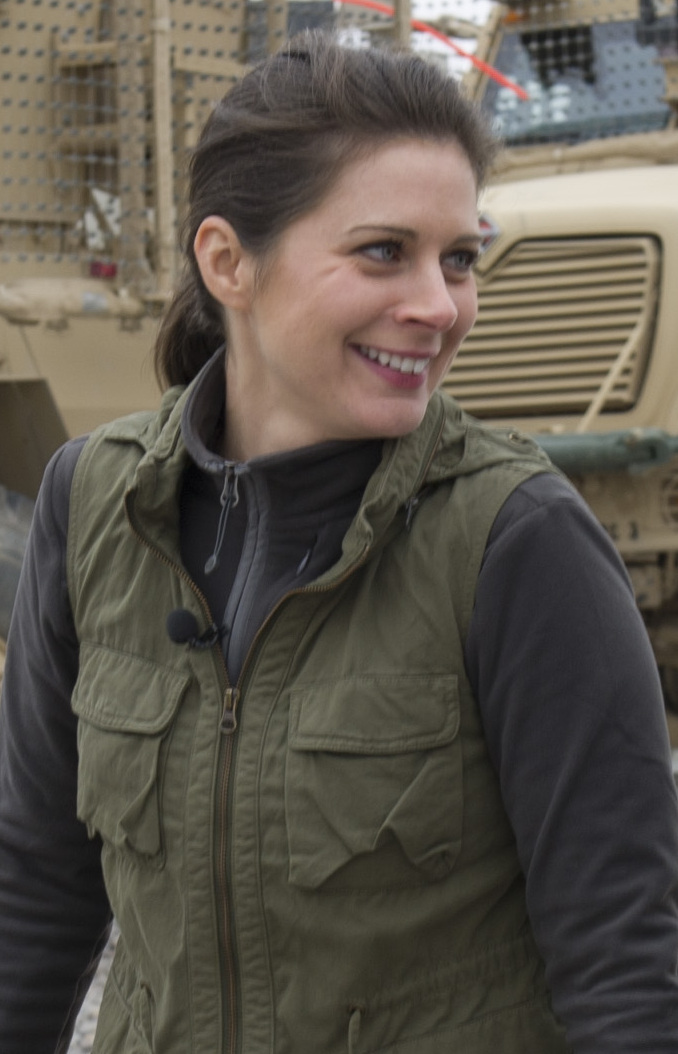
Erin Burnett

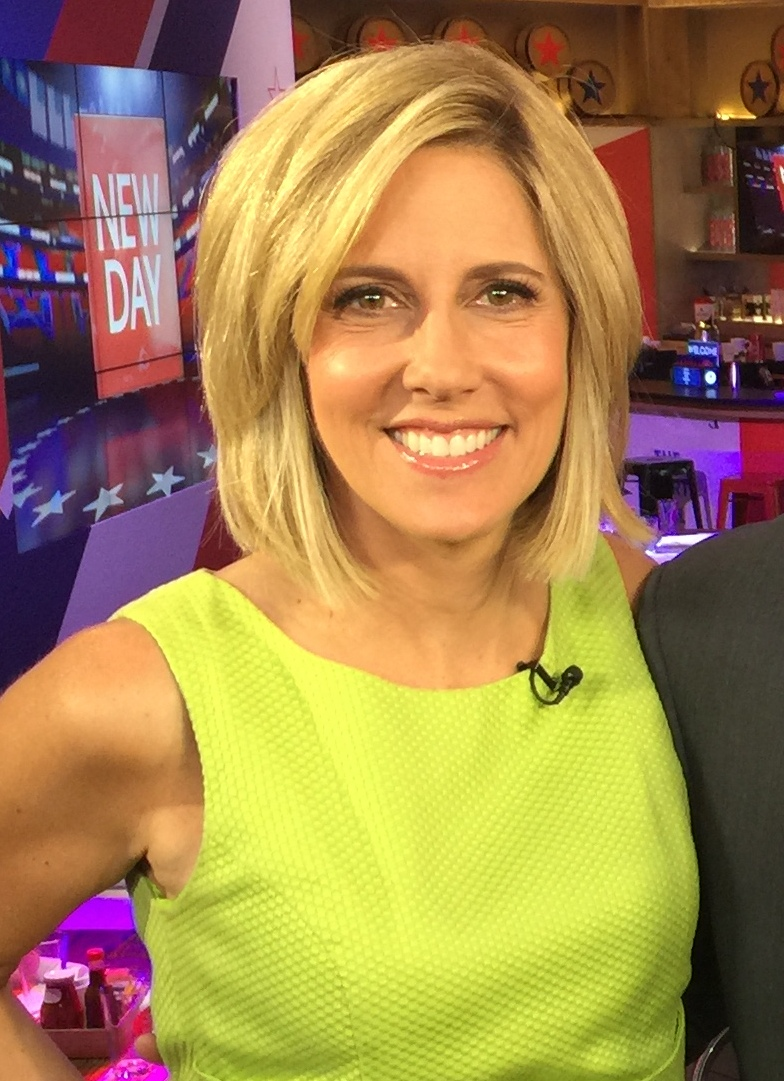
Alisyn Camerota

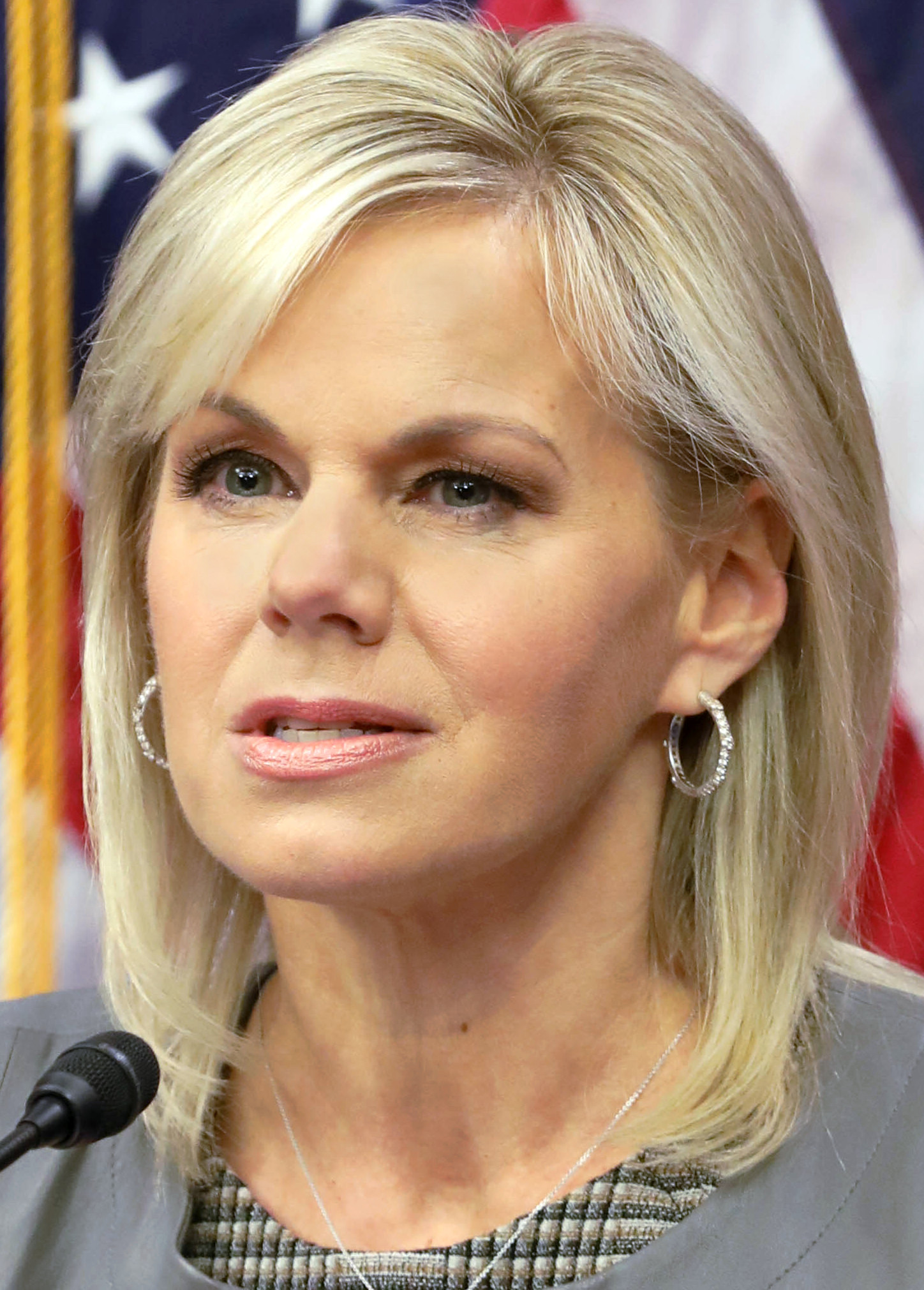
Gretchen Carlson

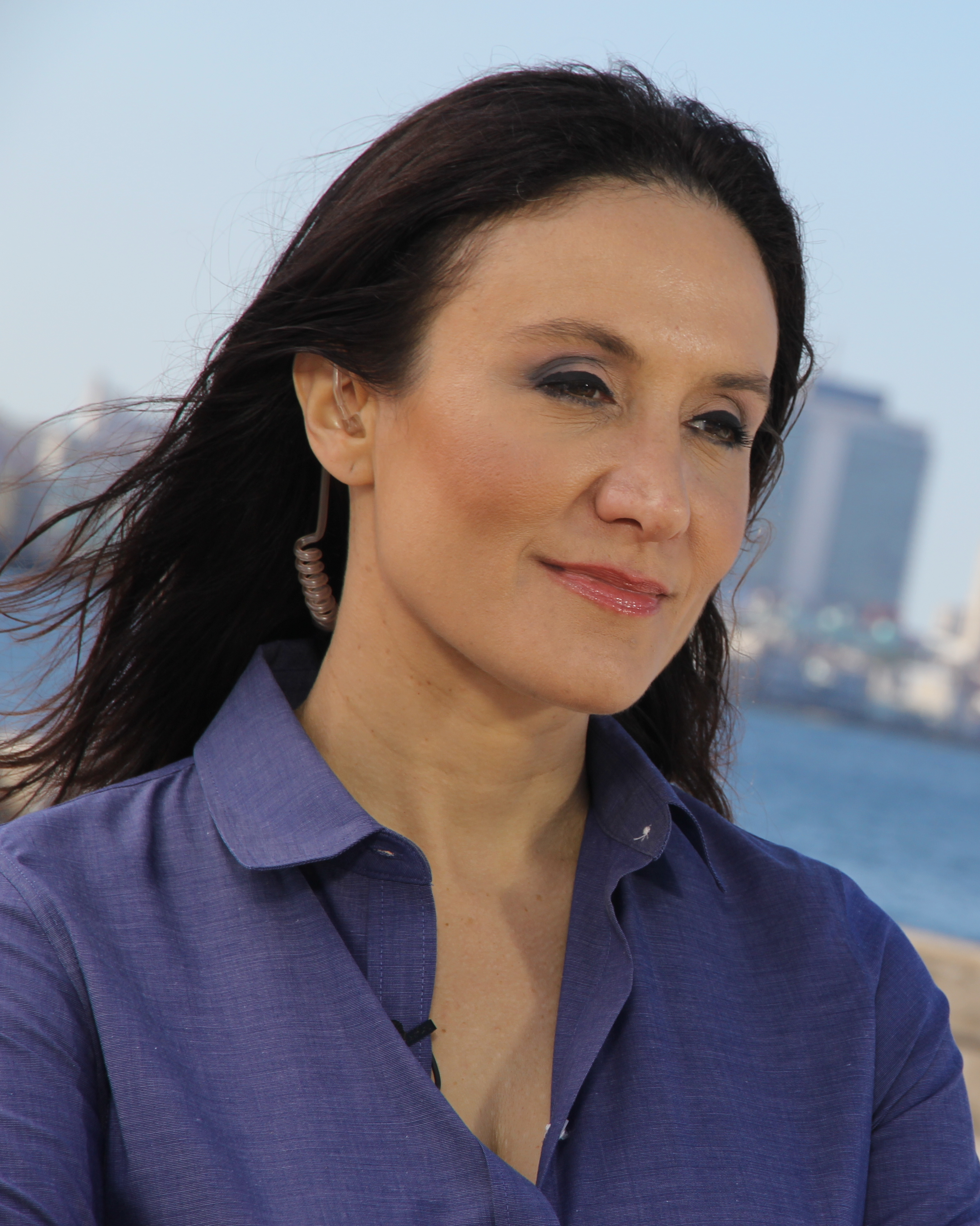
Michelle Caruso-Cabrera

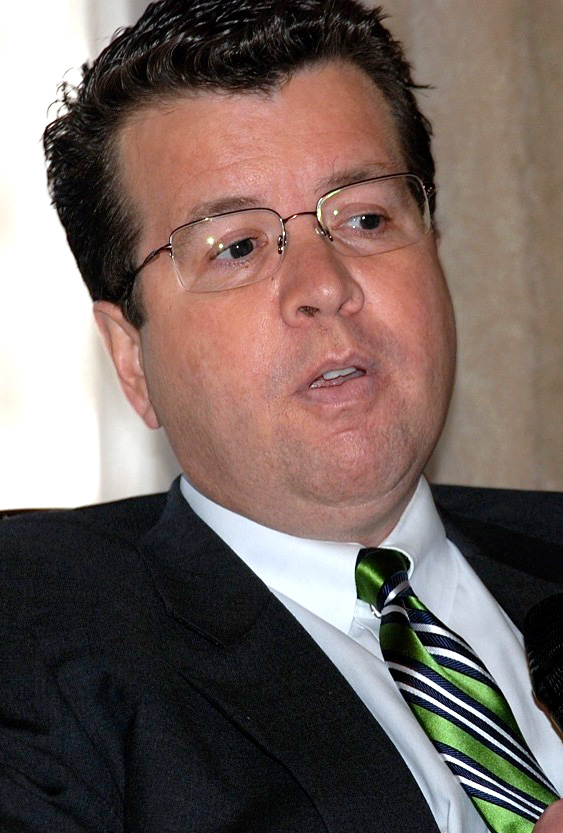
Neil Cavuto

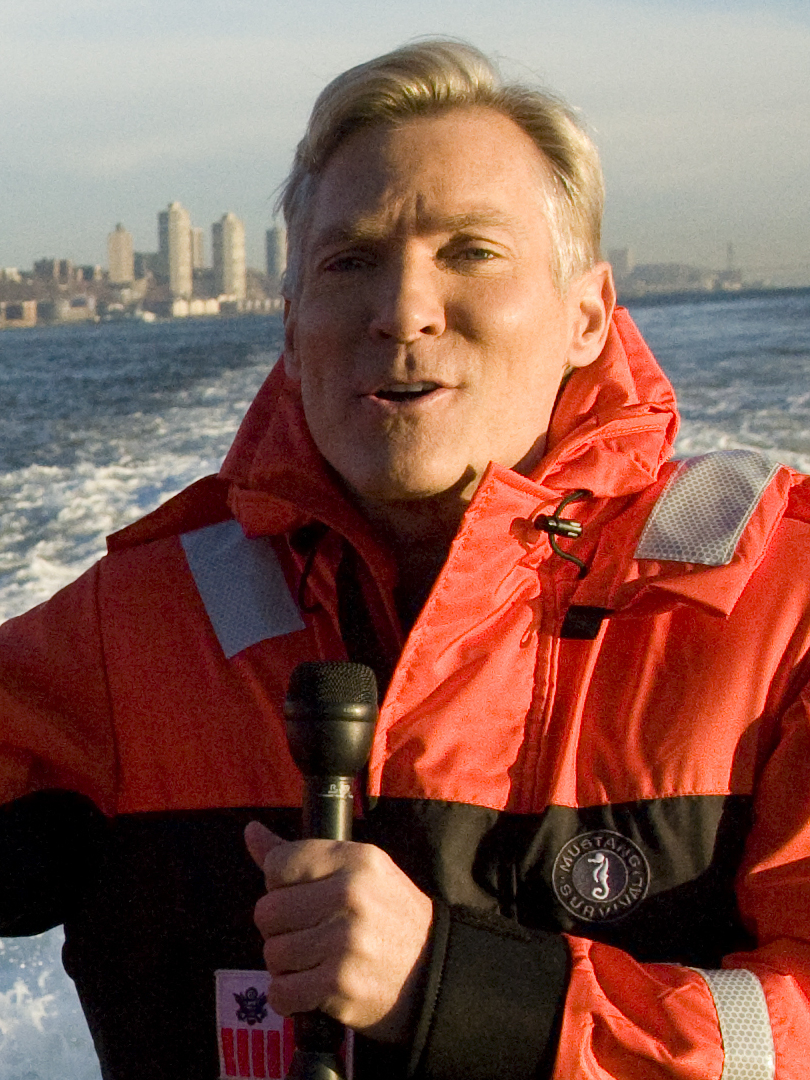
Sam Champion

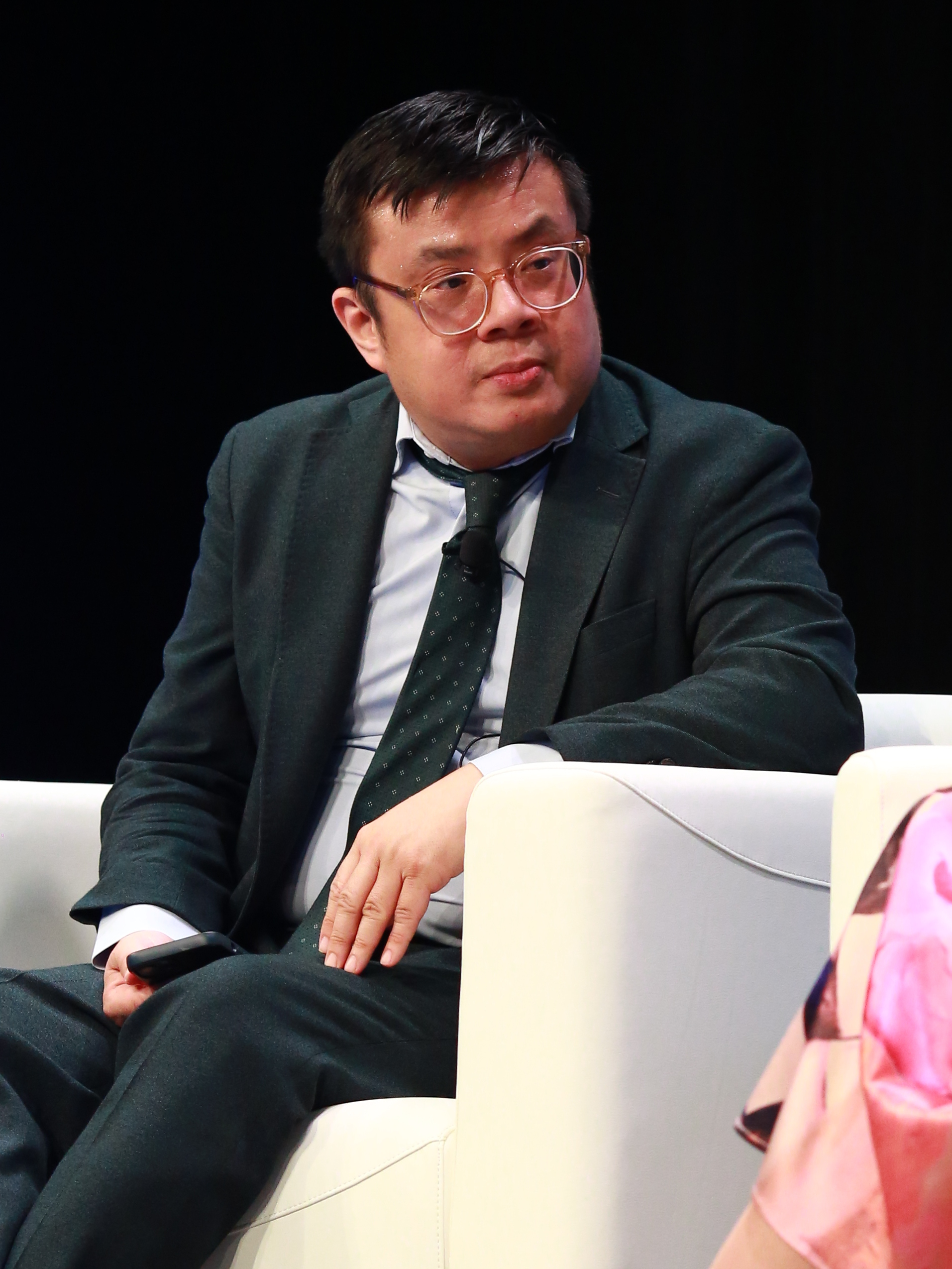
Sewell Chan

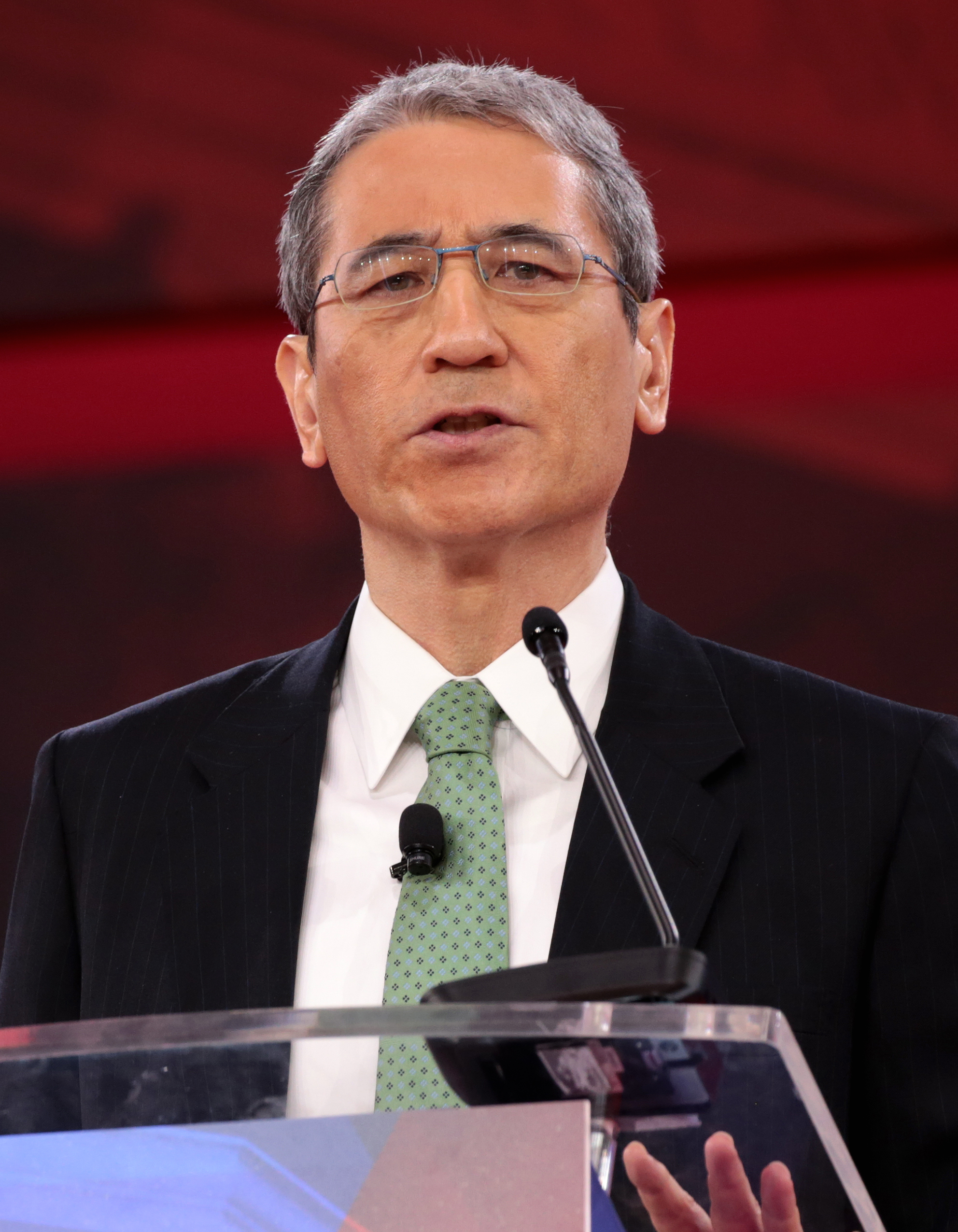
Gordon G. Chang

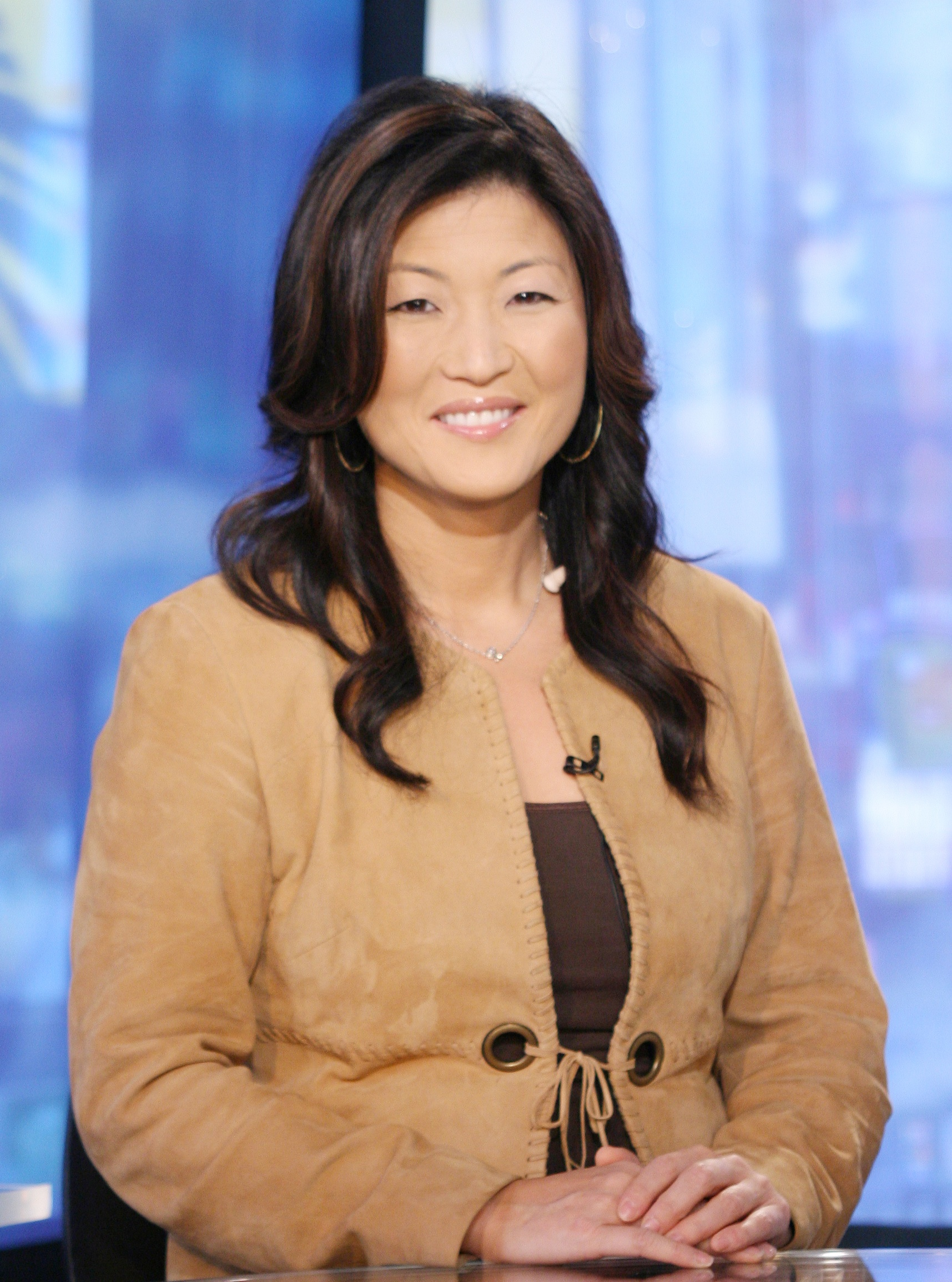
Juju Chang

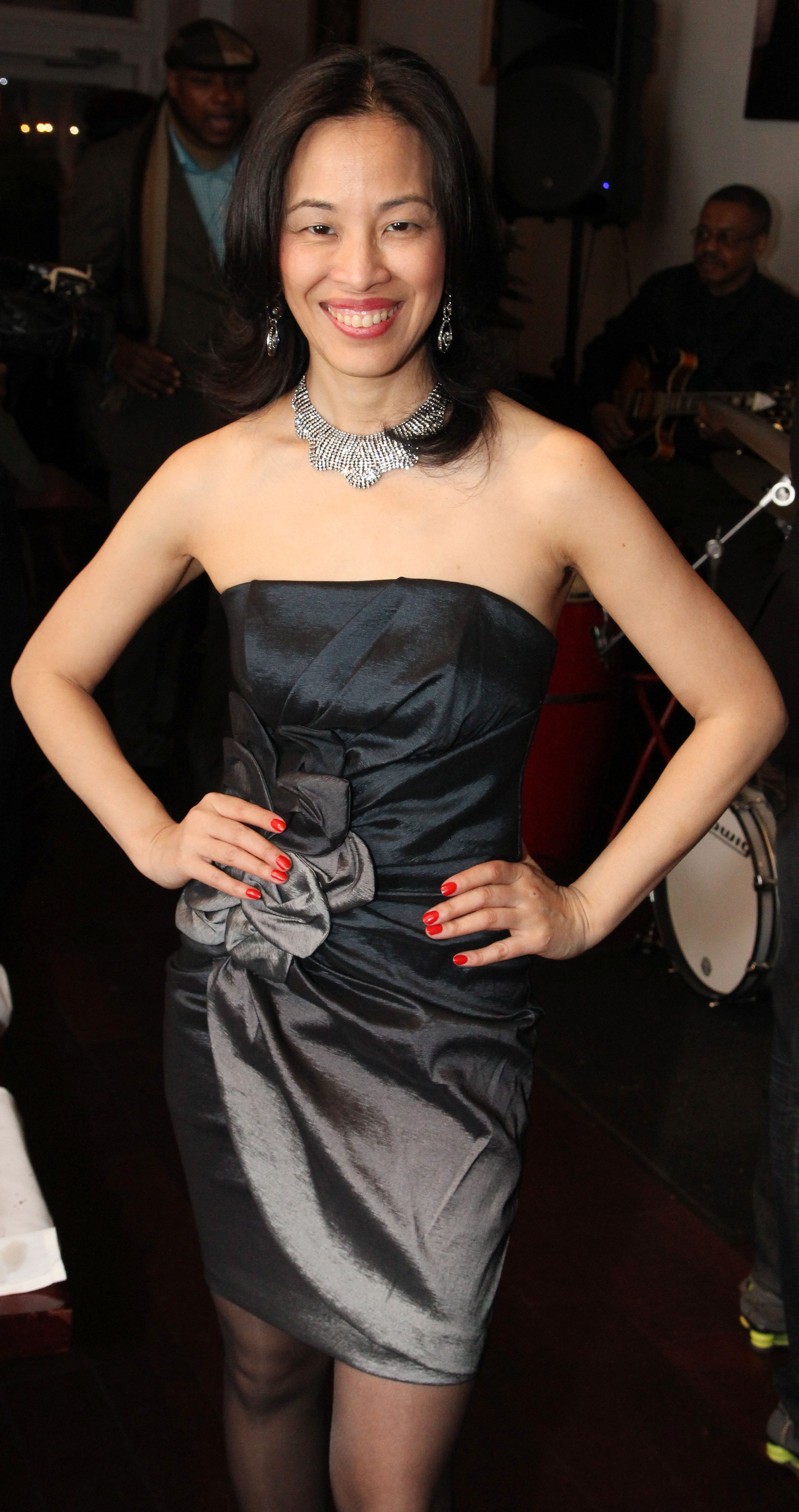
Lia Chang

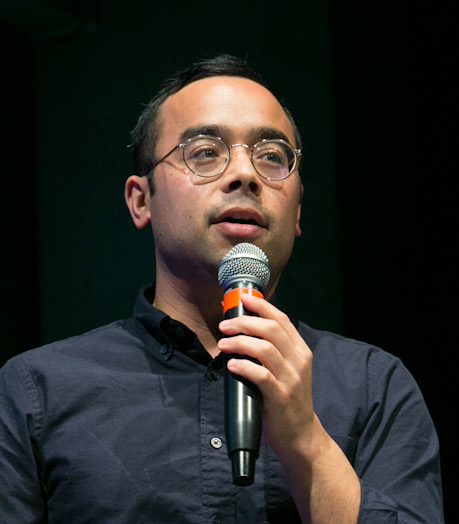
Adrian Chen

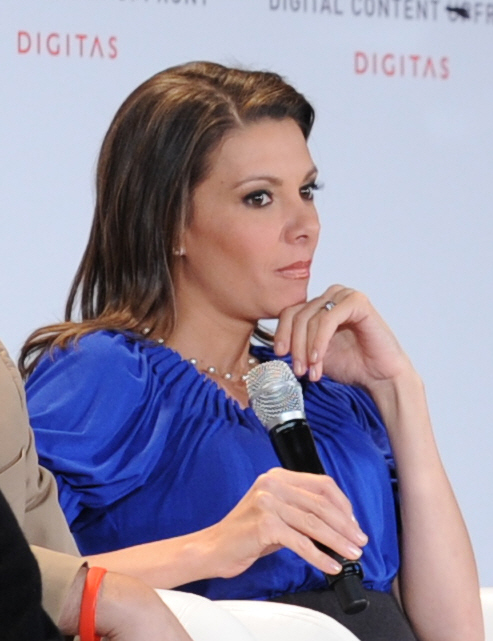
Kiran Chetry

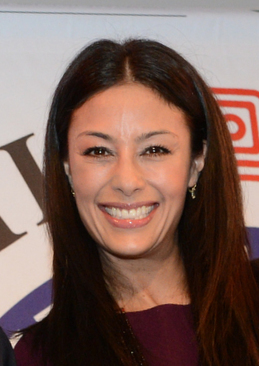
Liz Cho

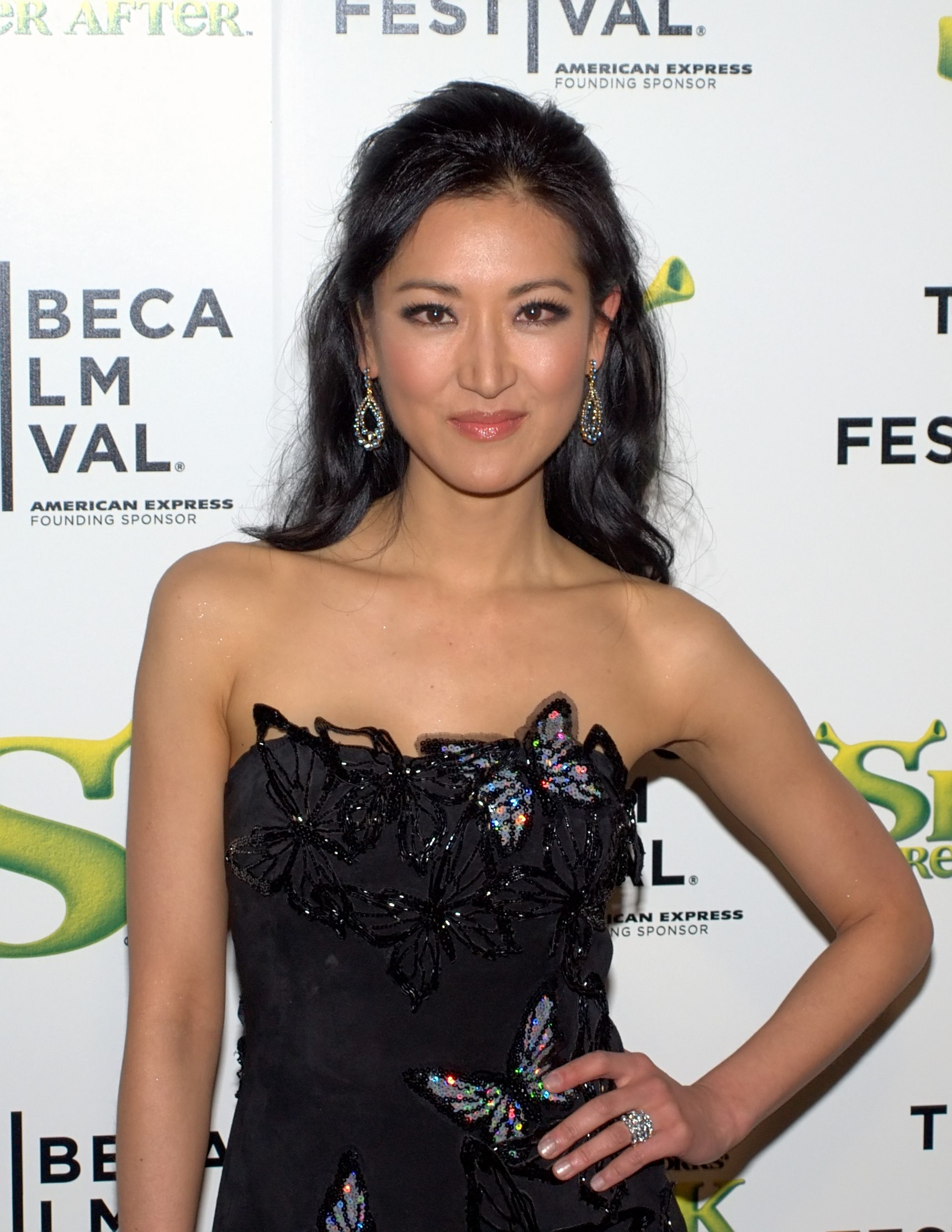
Kelly Choi

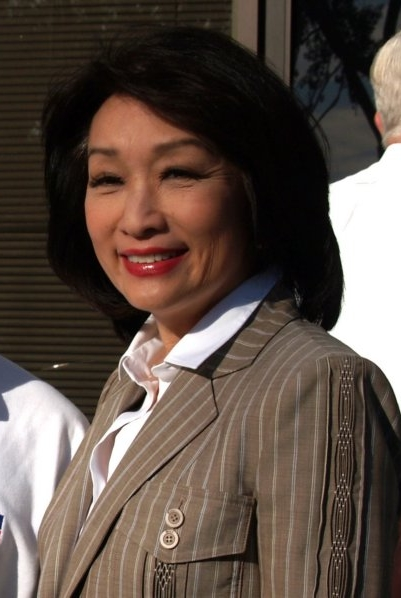
Connie Chung

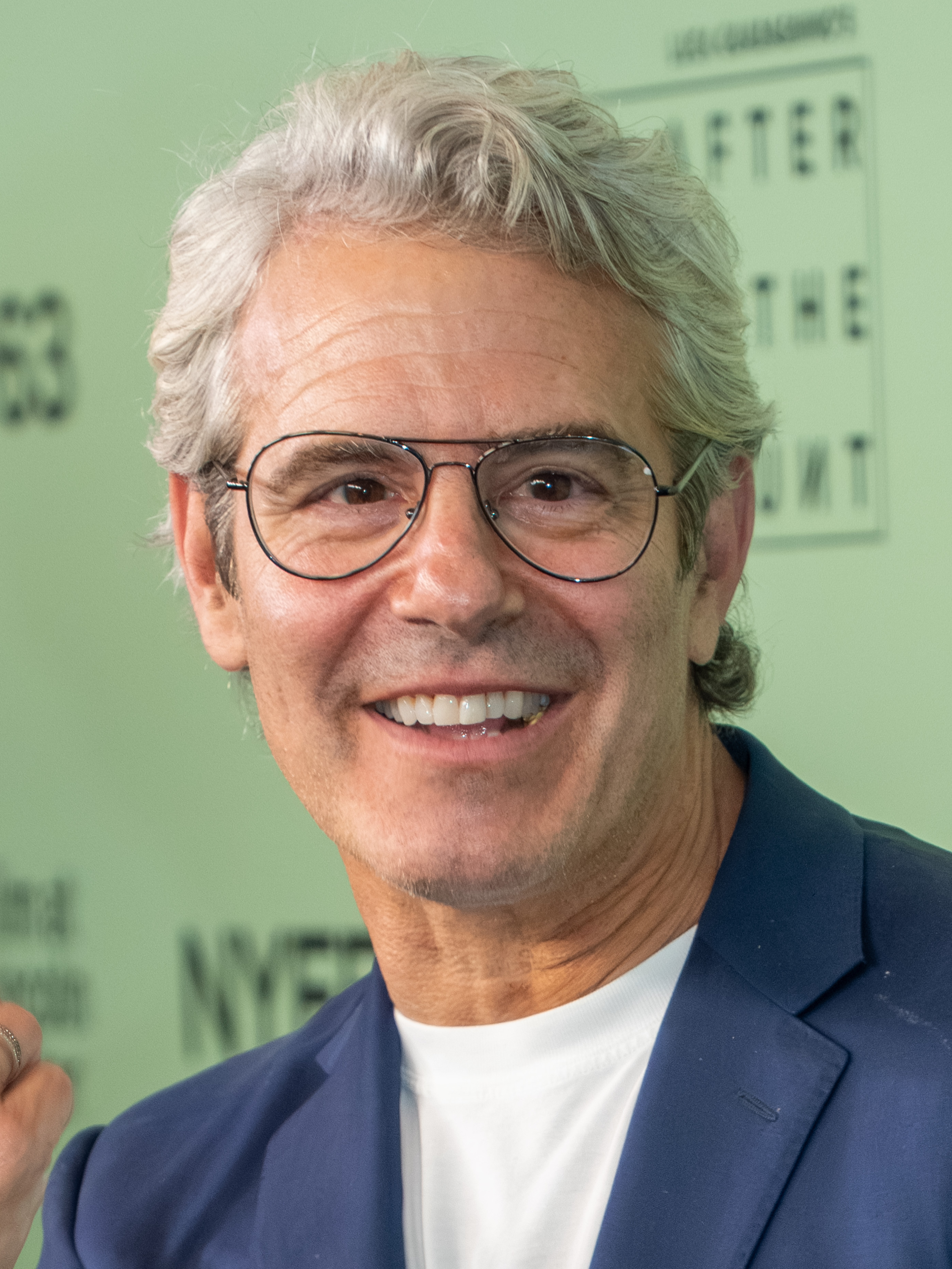
Andy Cohen

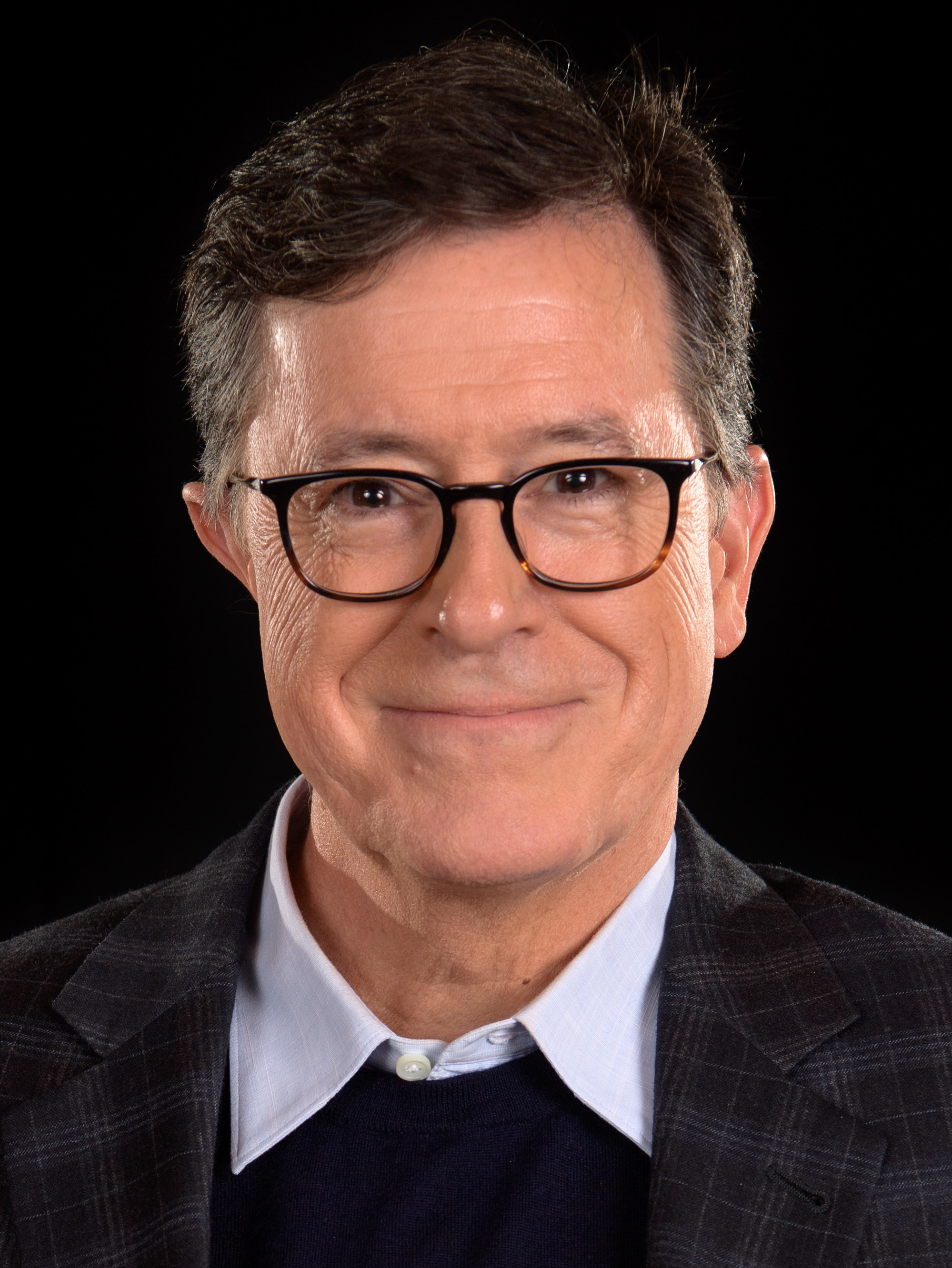
Stephen Colbert

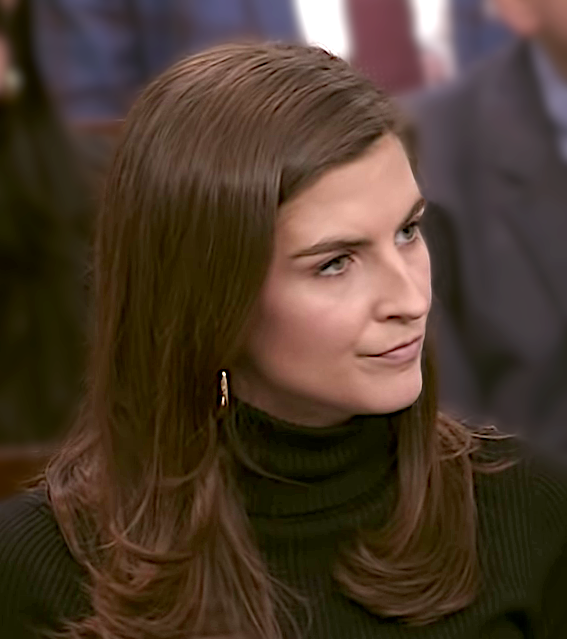
Kaitlan Collins

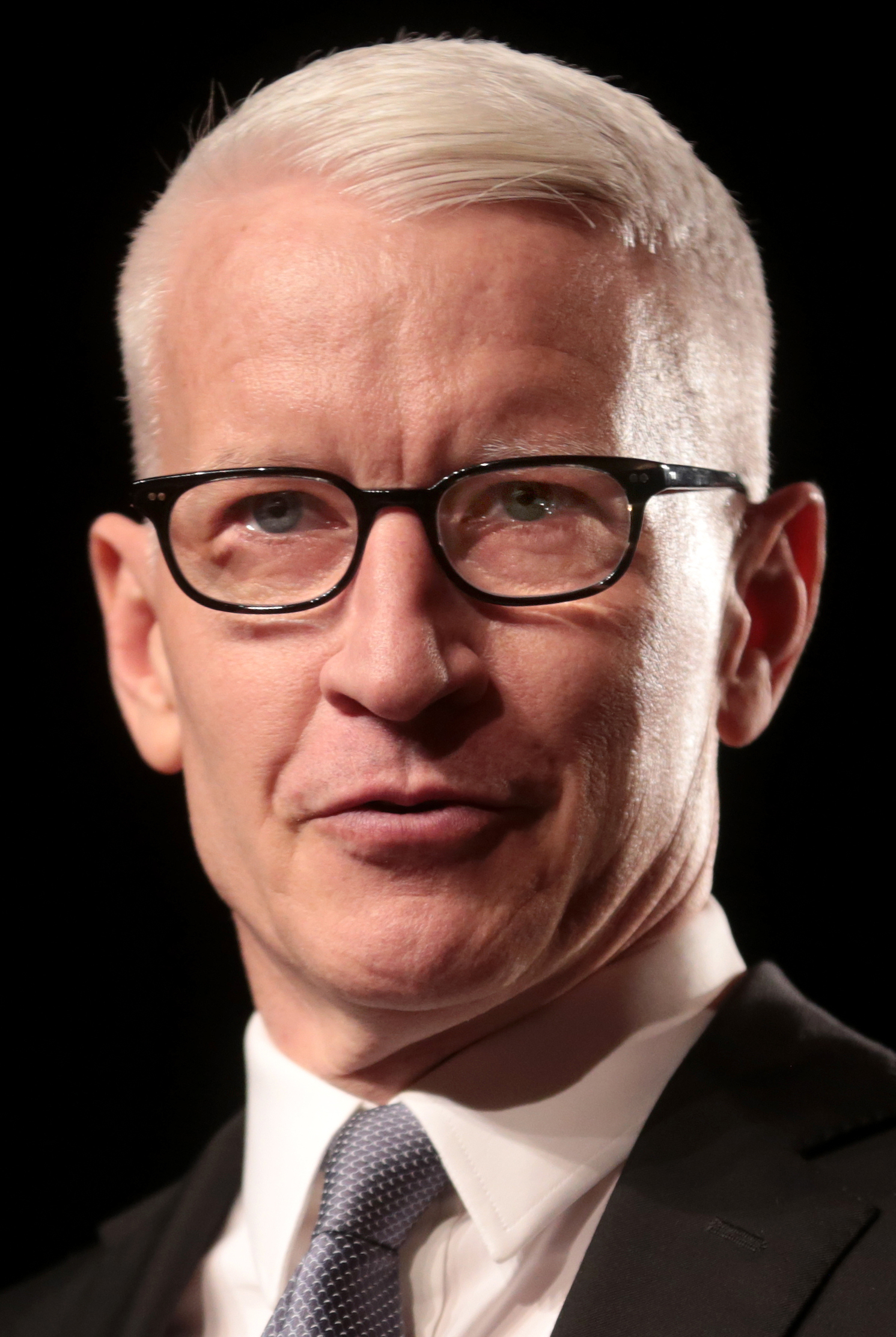
Anderson Cooper

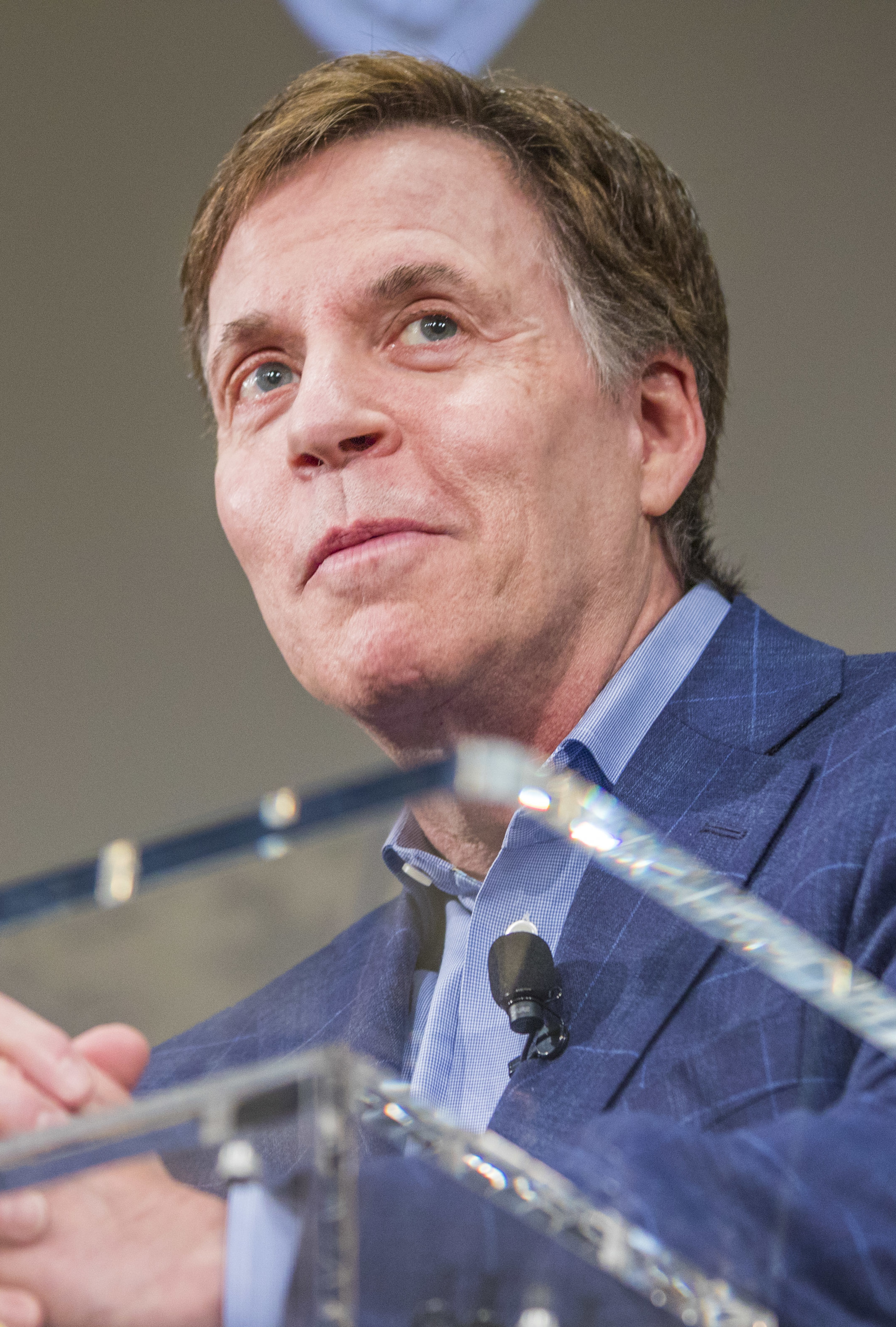
Bob Costas

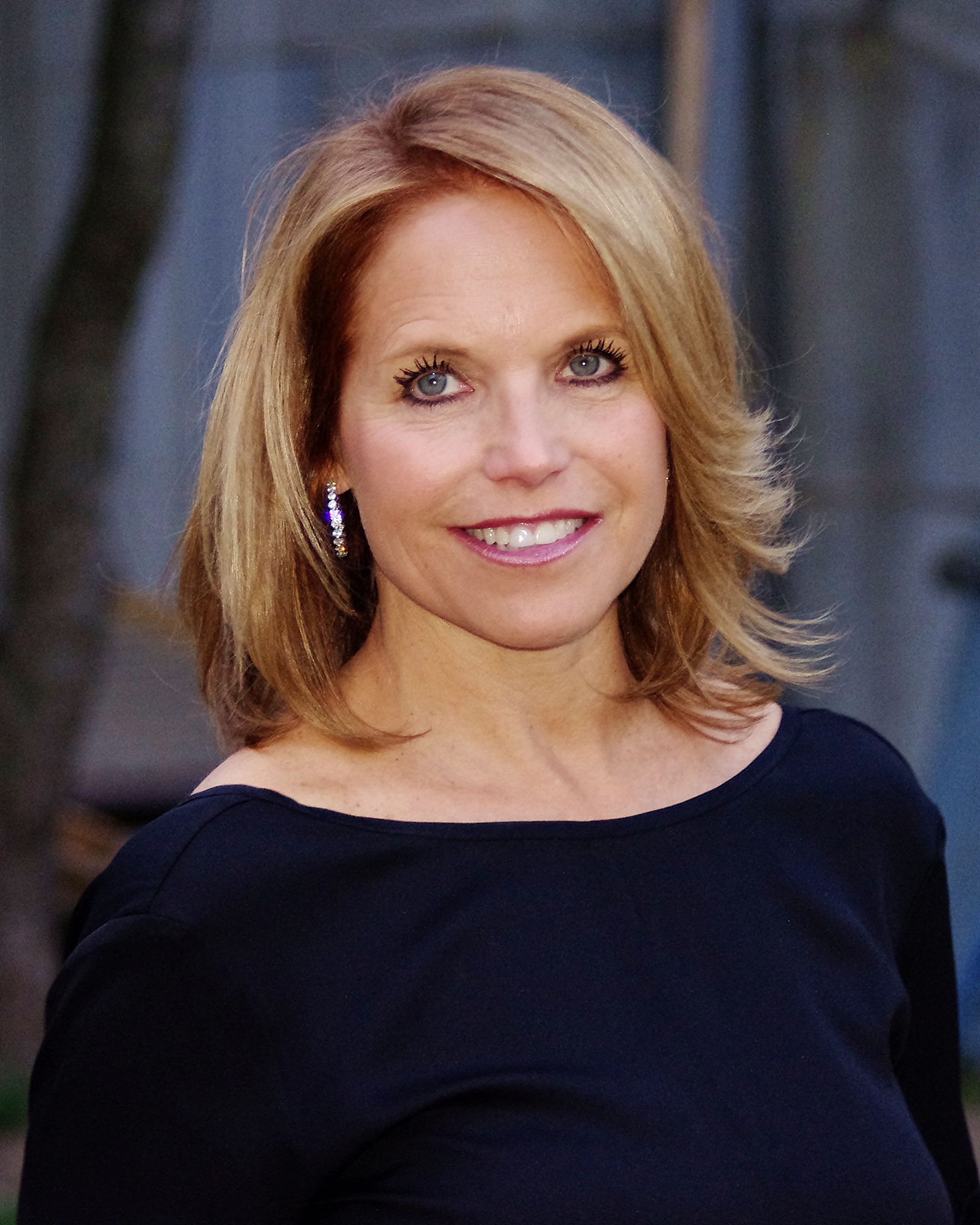
Katie Couric

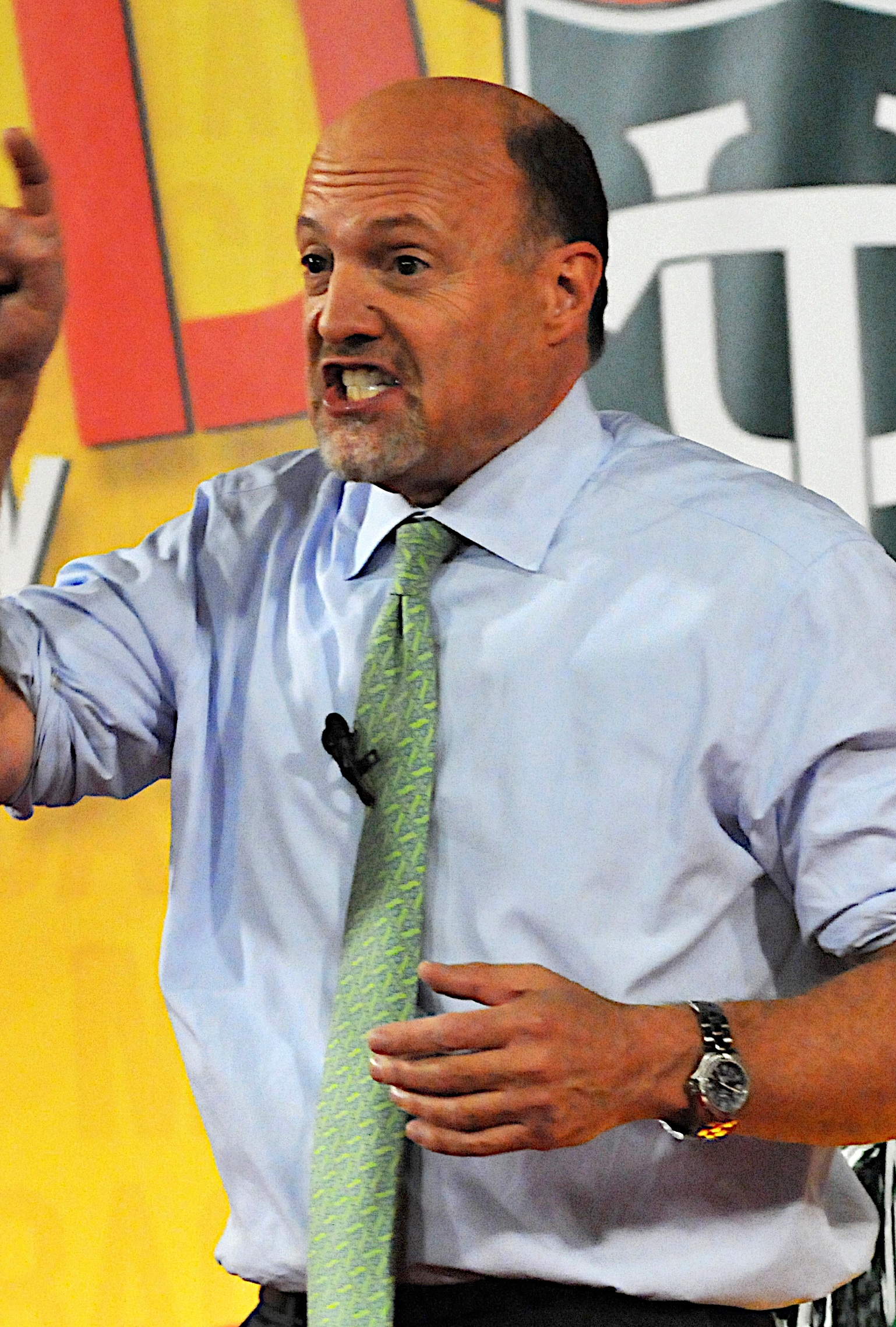
Jim Cramer

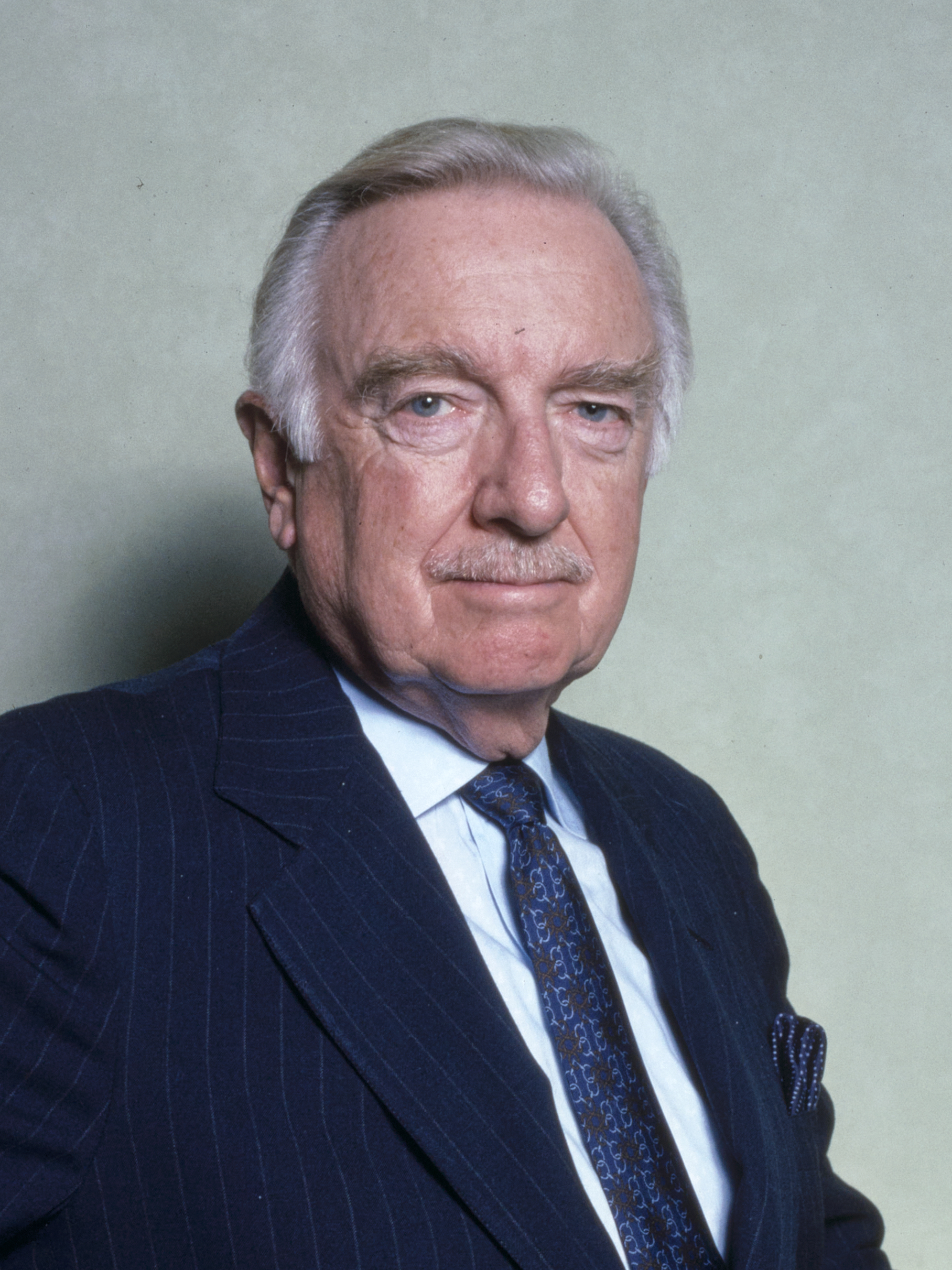
Walter Cronkite

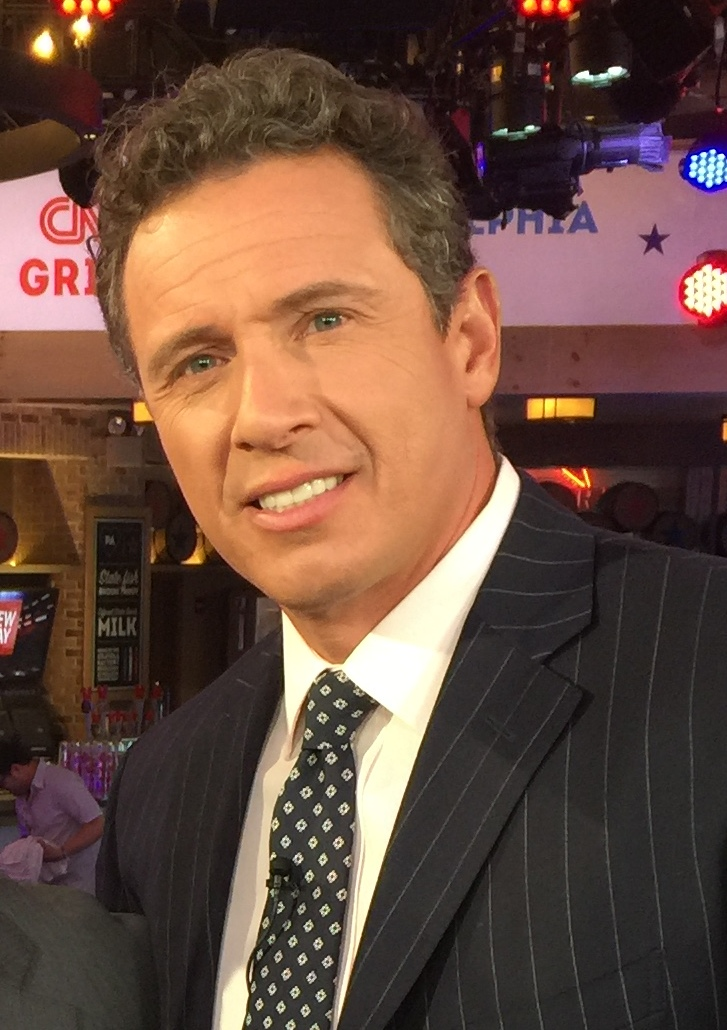
Chris Cuomo

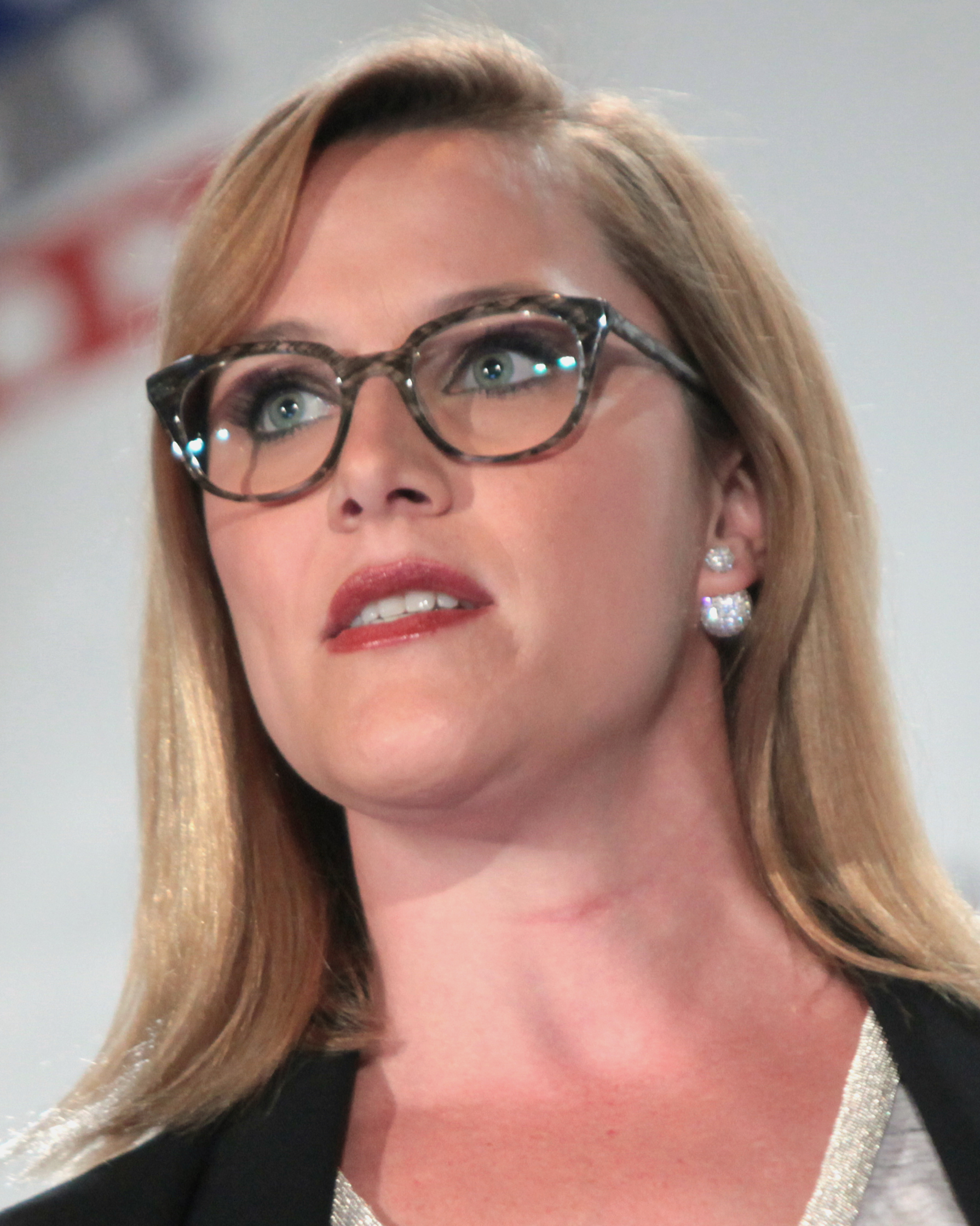
S. E. Cupp

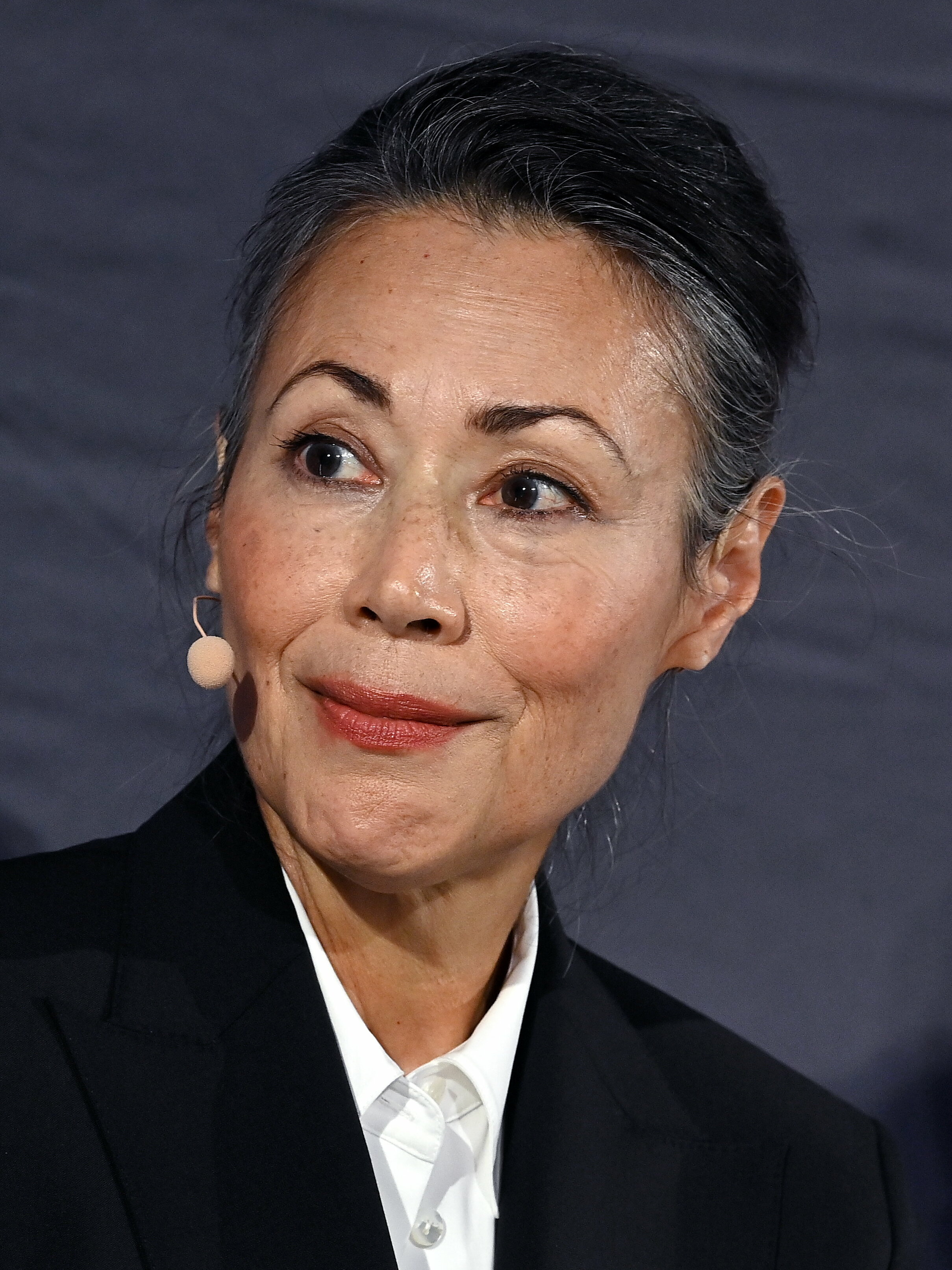
Ann Curry

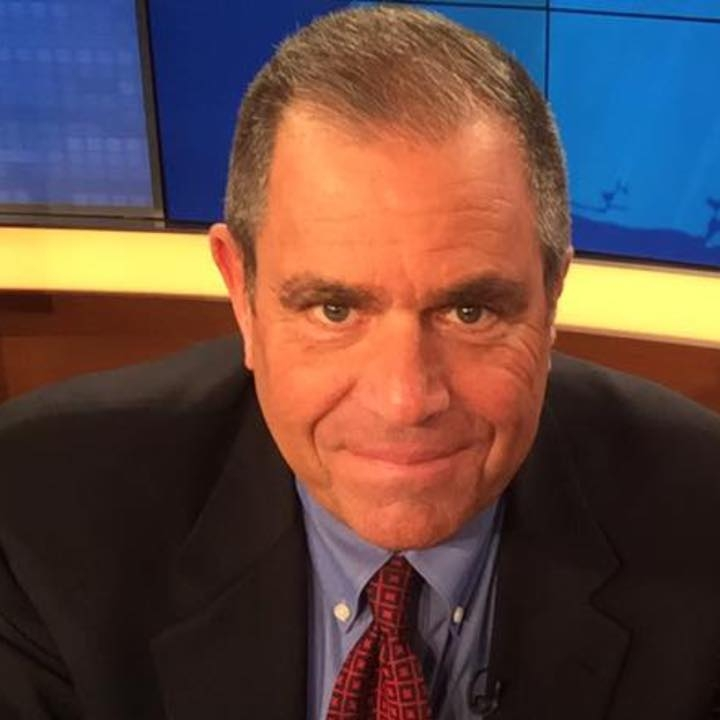
Ted David

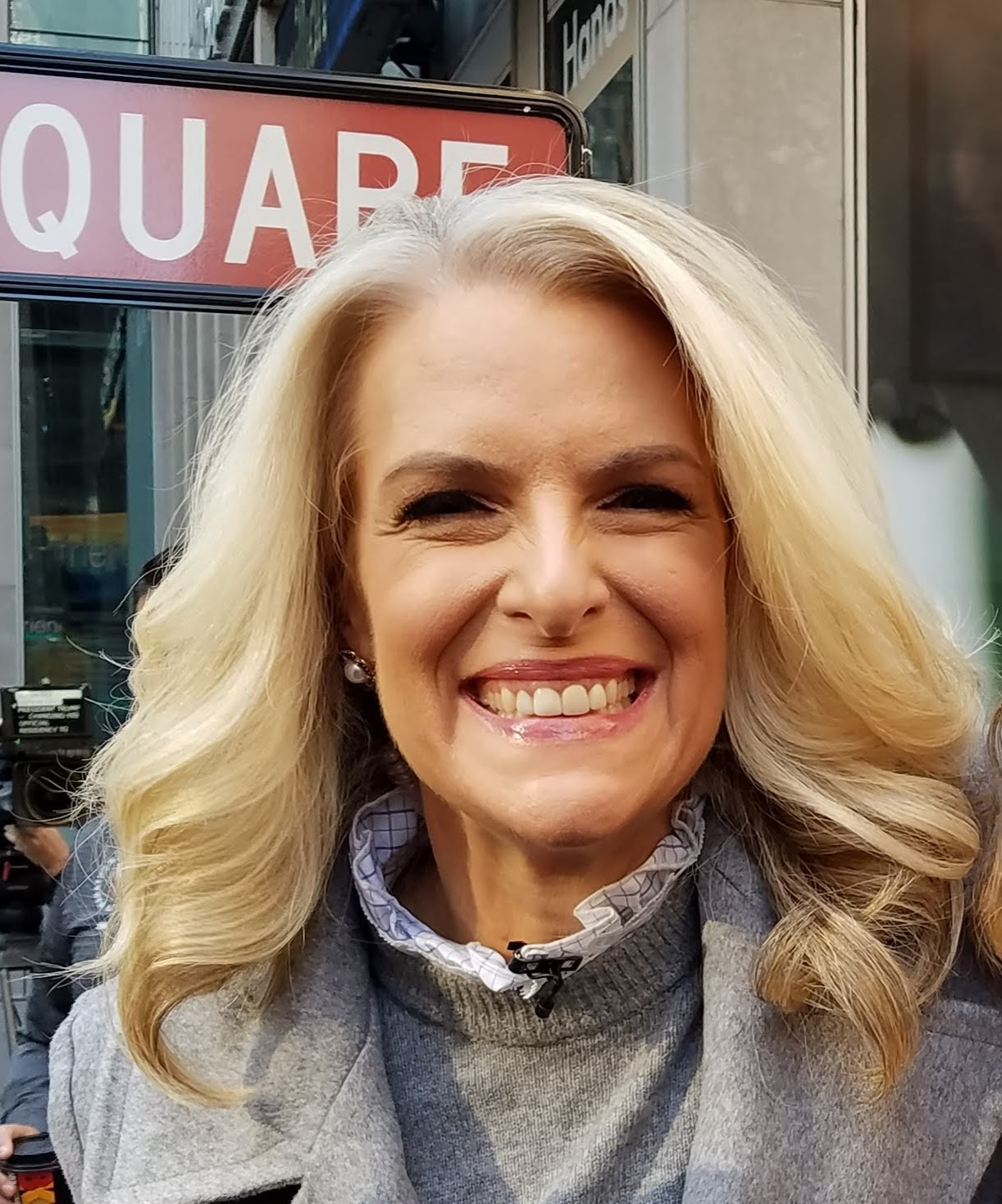
Janice Dean

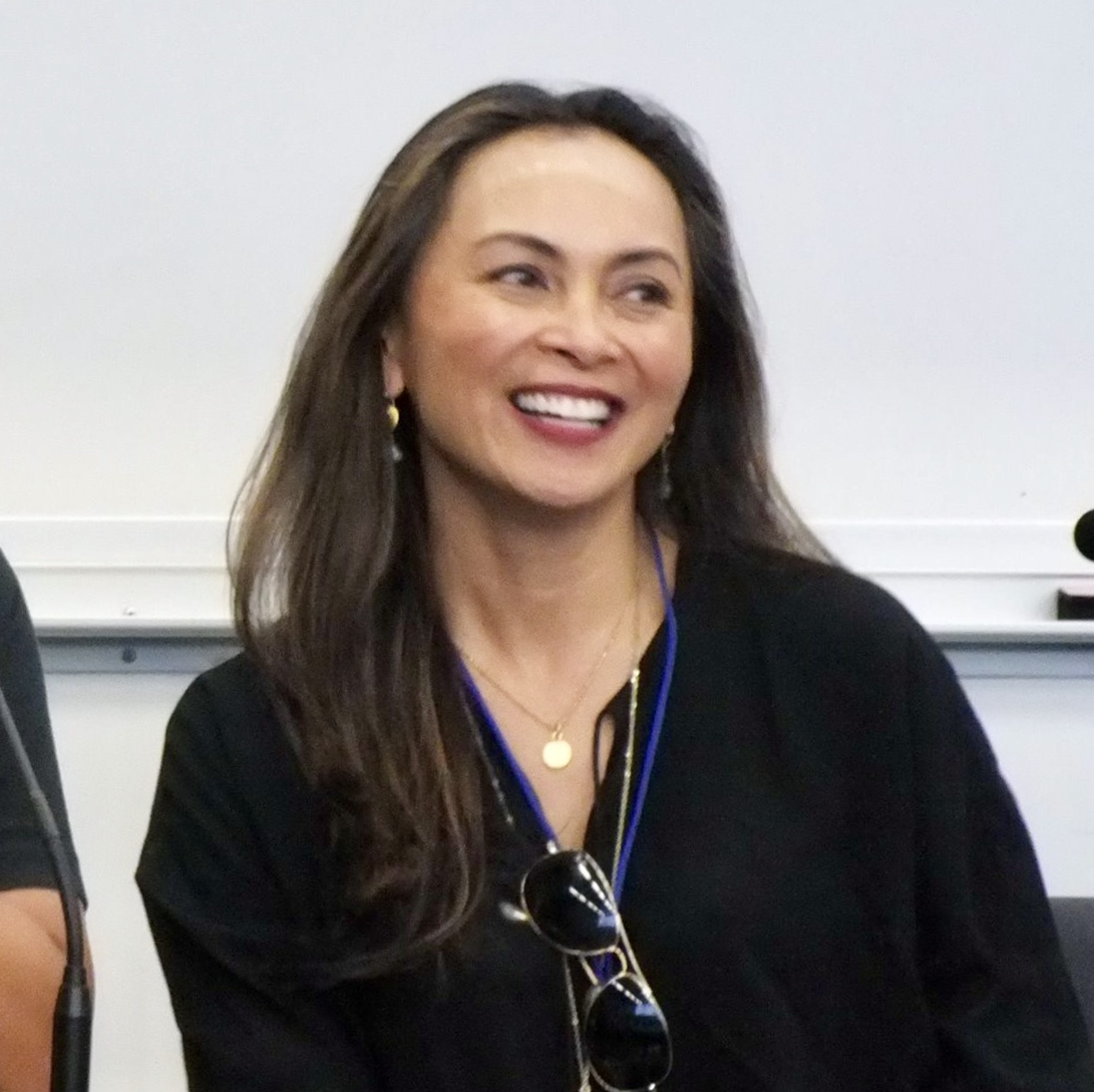
Ernabel Demillo

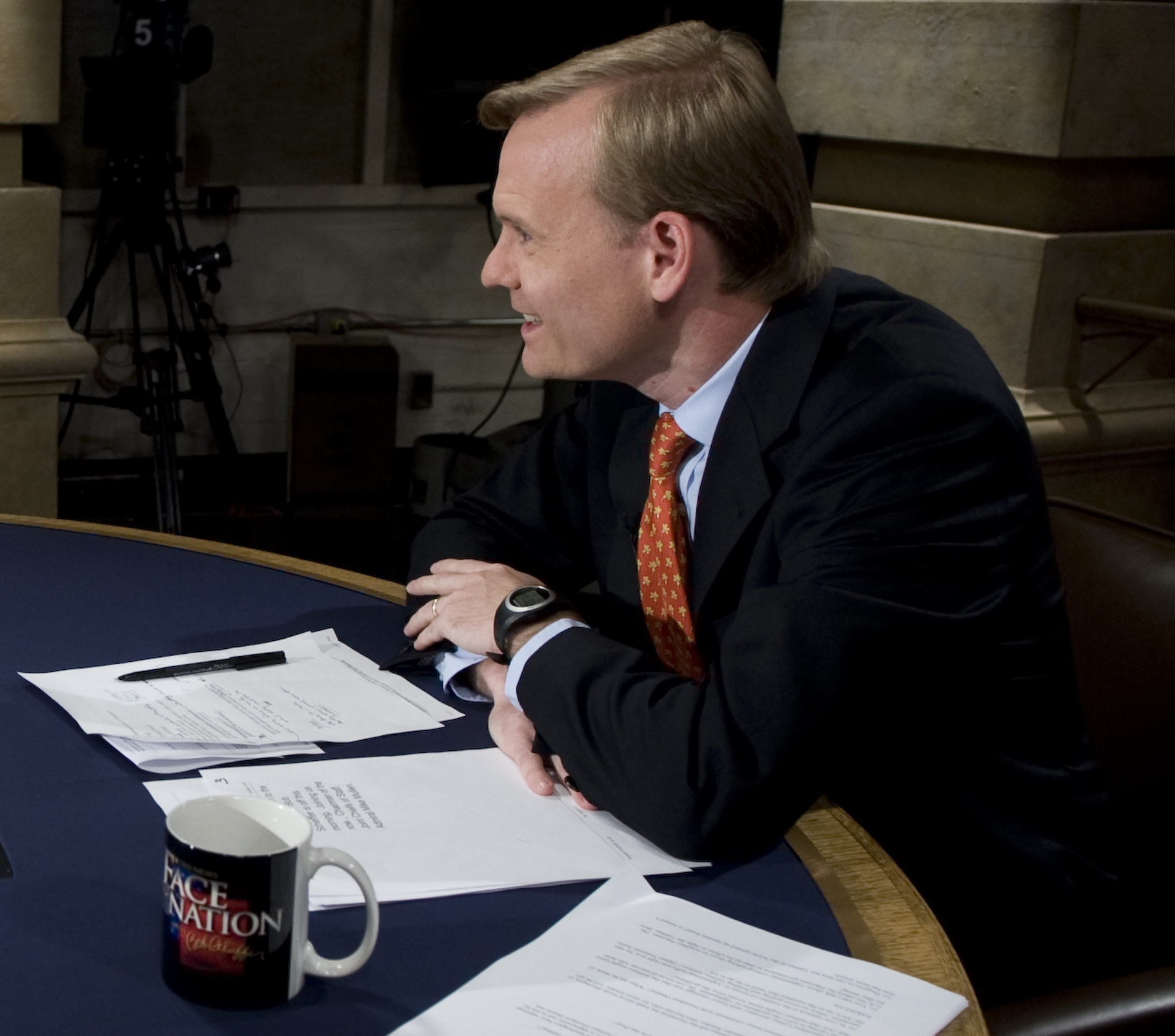
John Dickerson

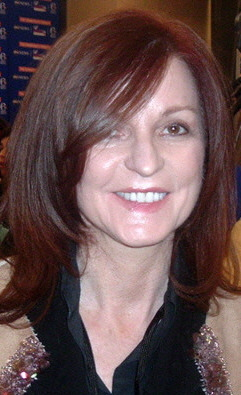
Maureen Dowd

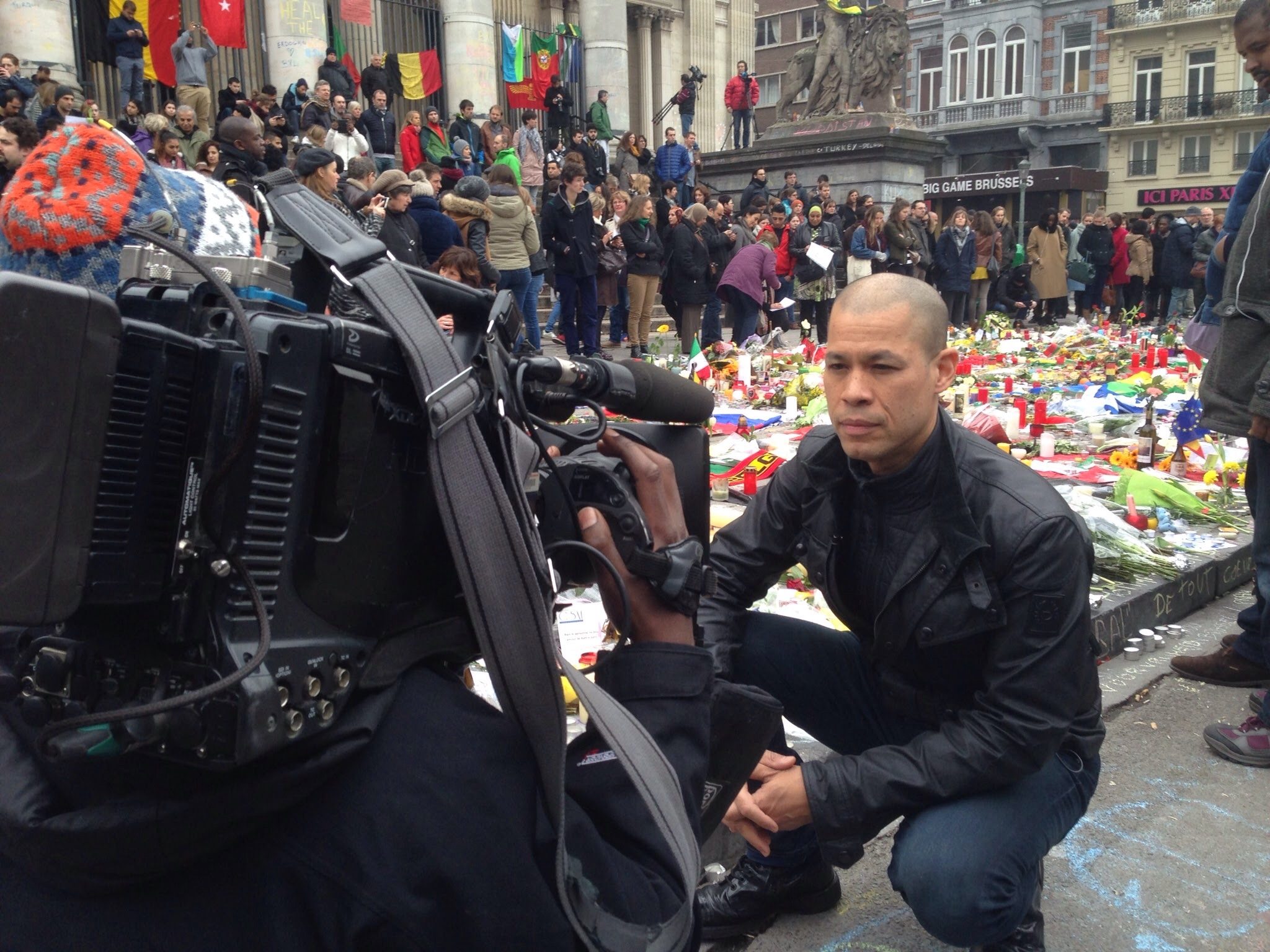
Vladimir Duthiers

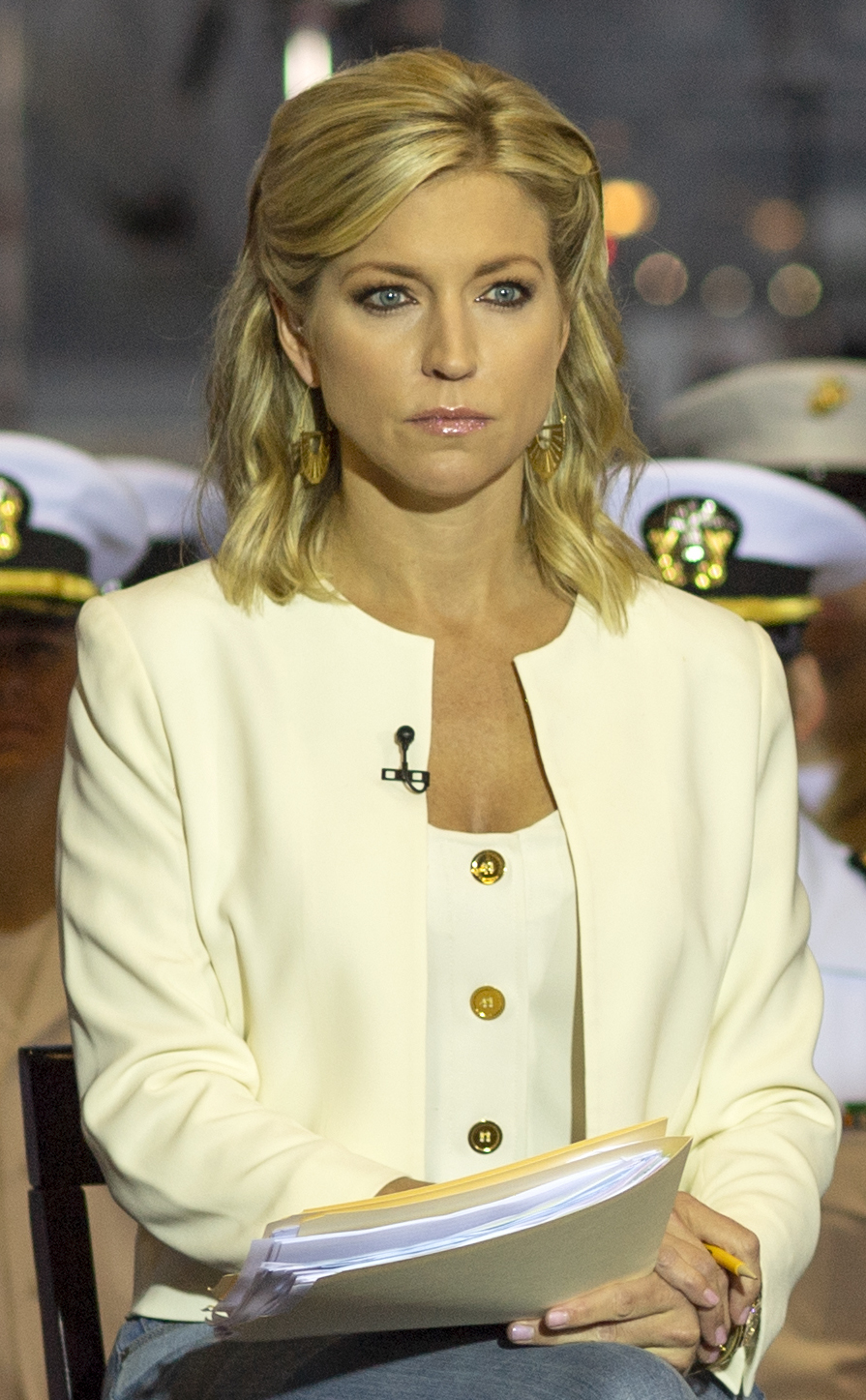
Ainsley Earhardt

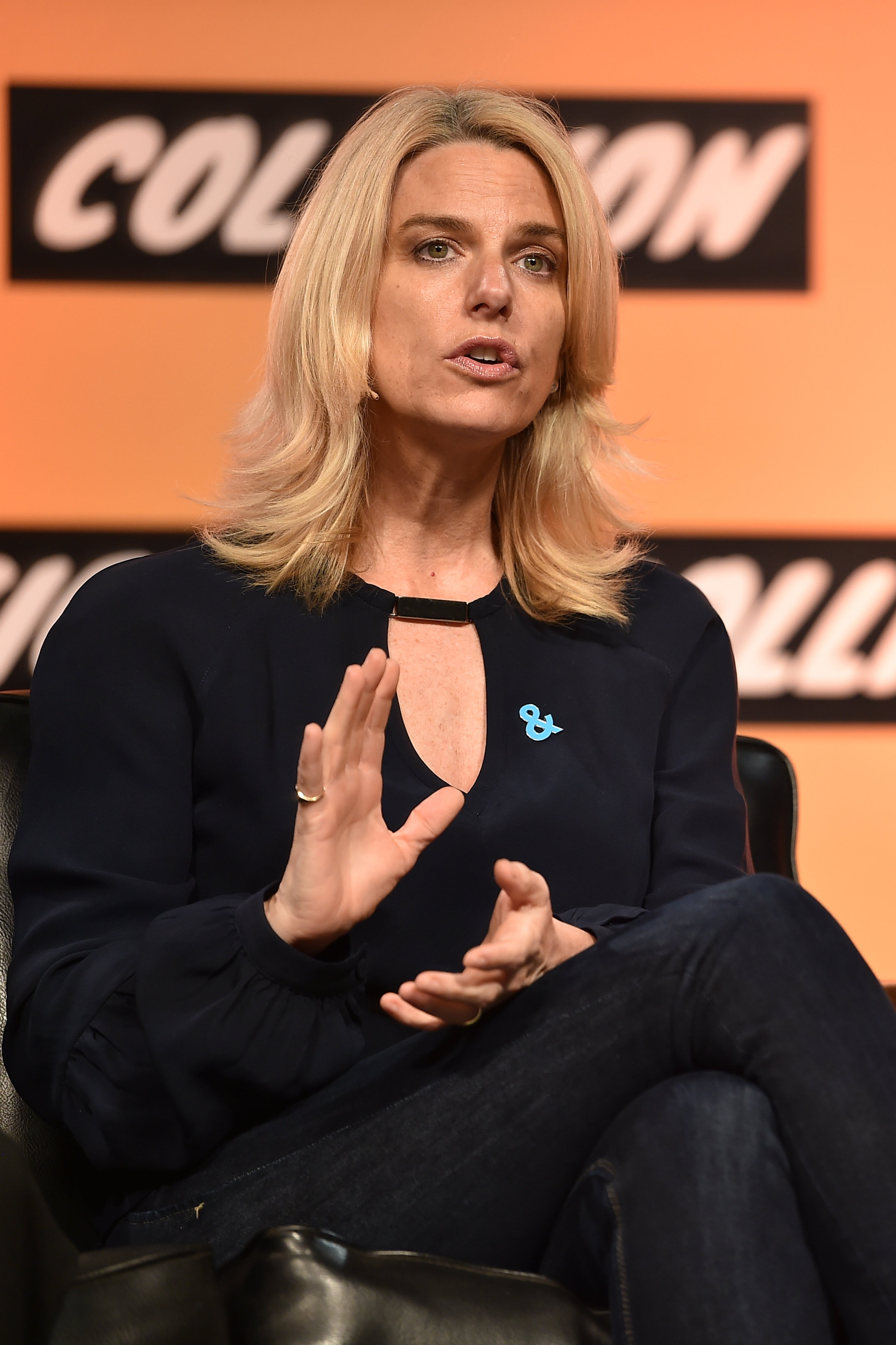
Sarah Kate Ellis

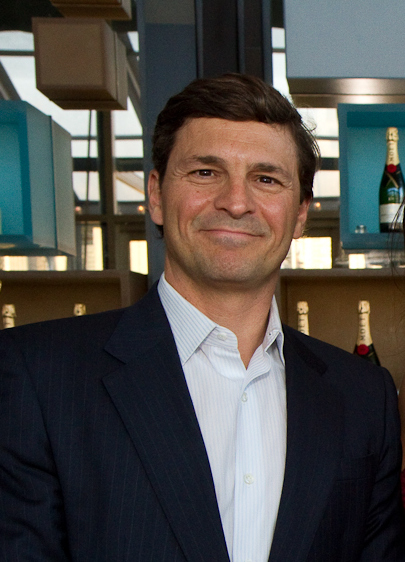
David Faber

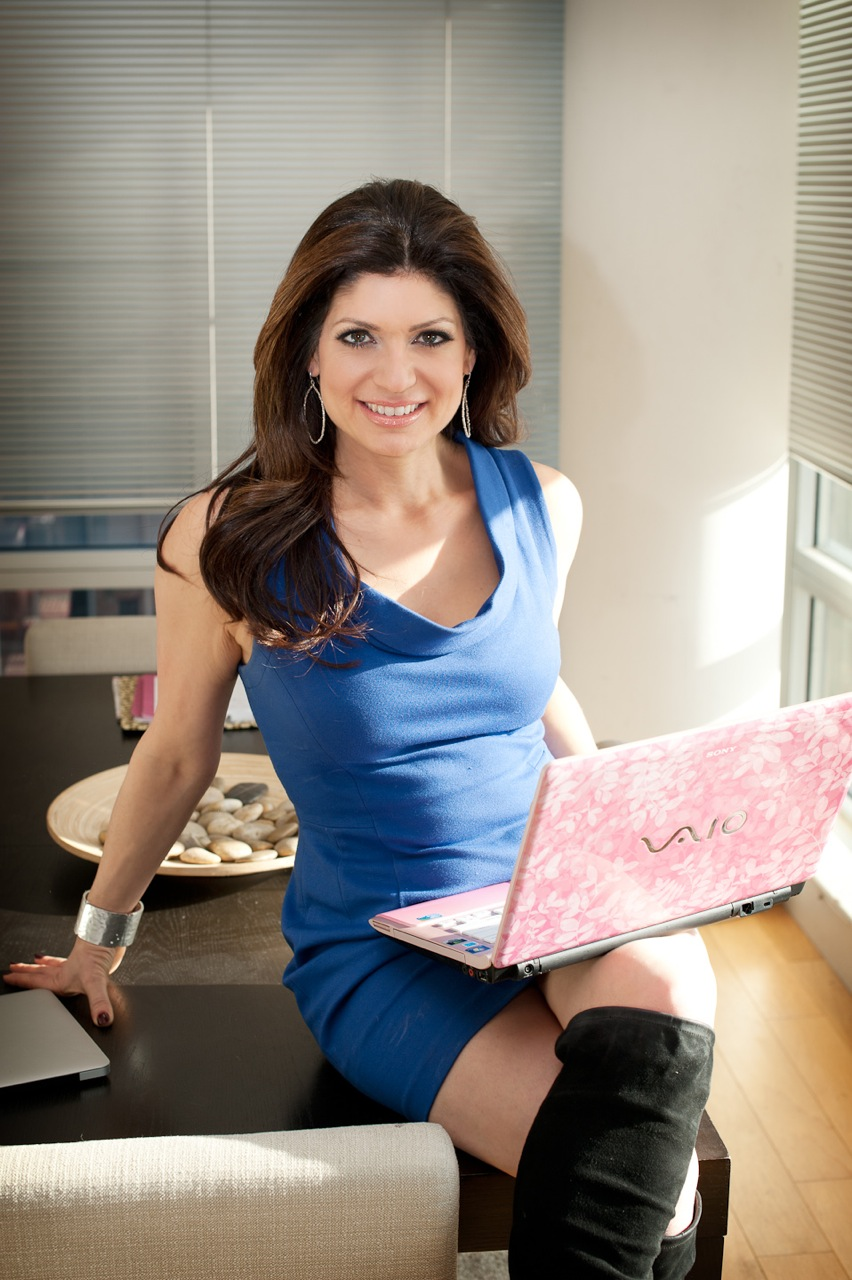
Tamsen Fadal

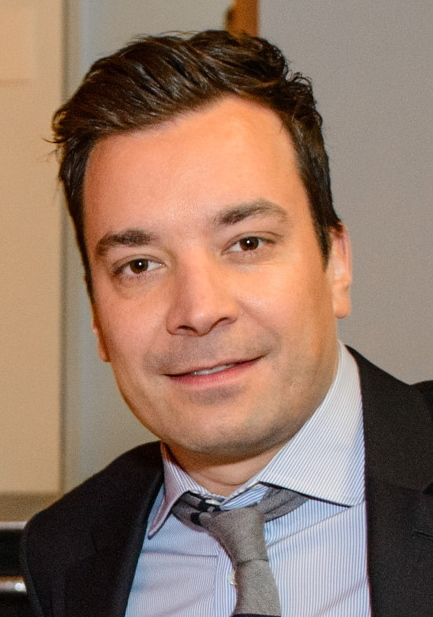
Jimmy Fallon

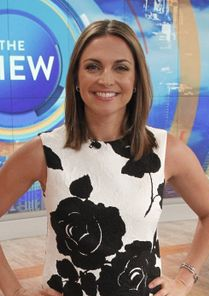
Paula Faris

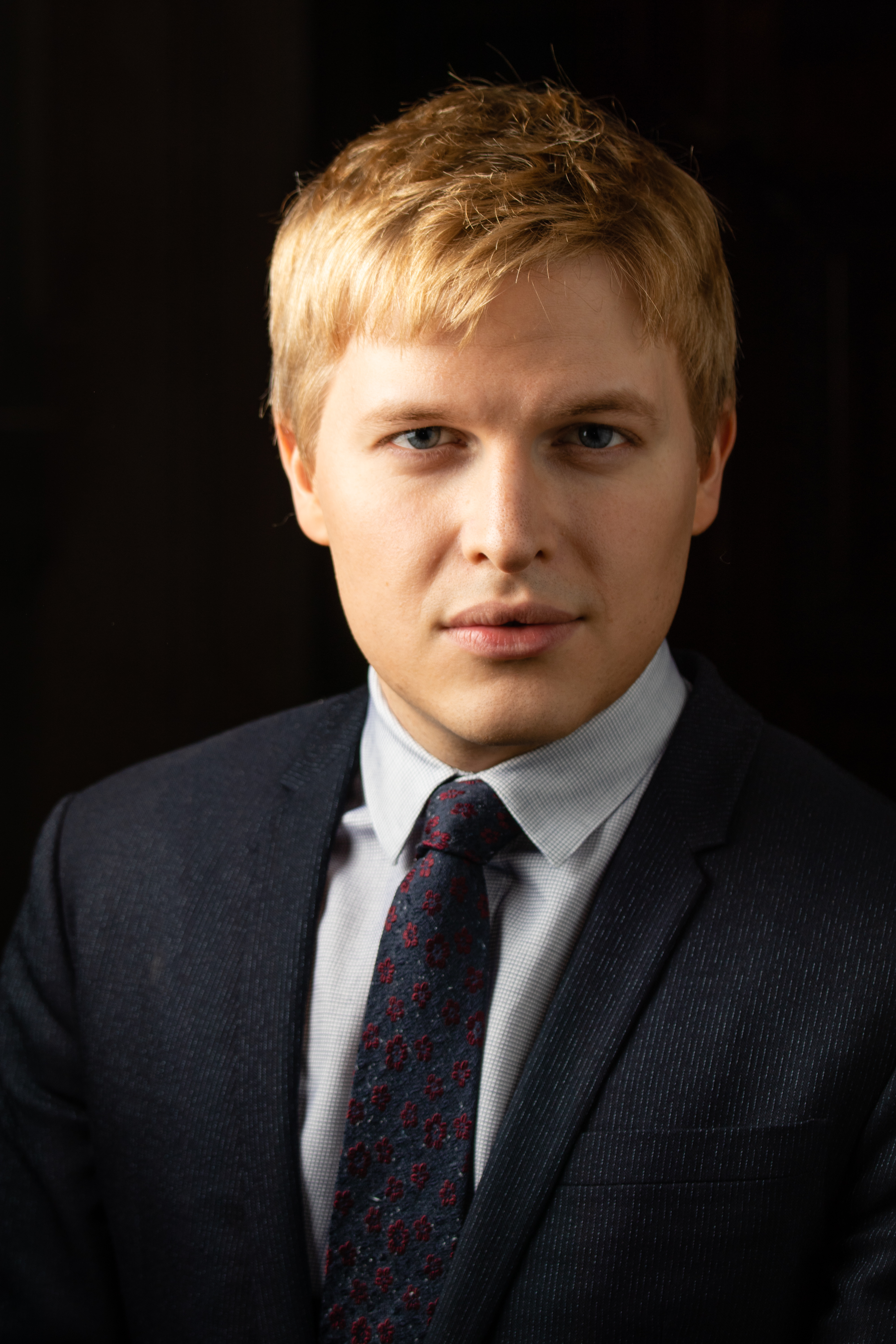
Ronan Farrow

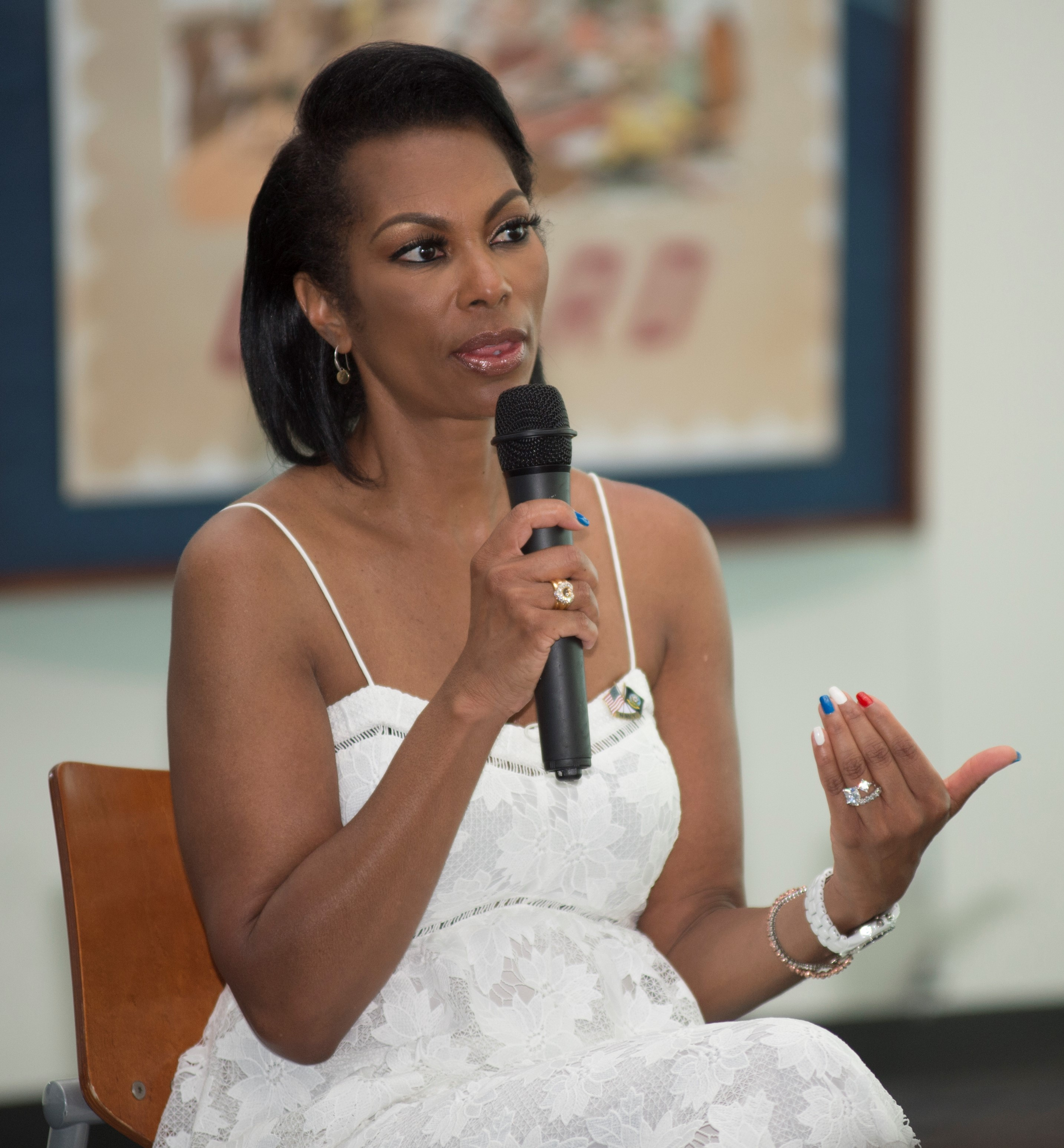
Harris Faulkner

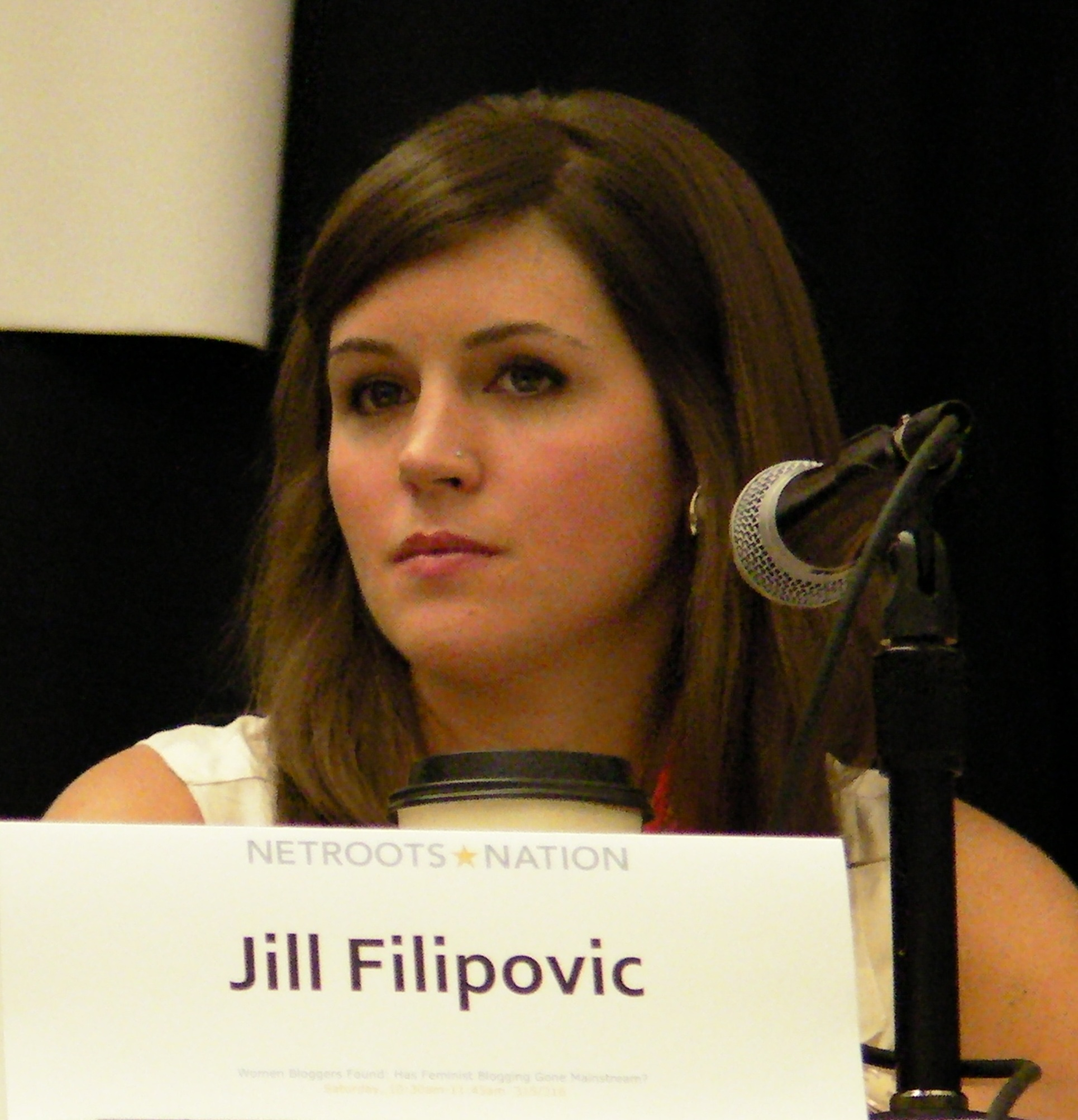
Jill Filipovic

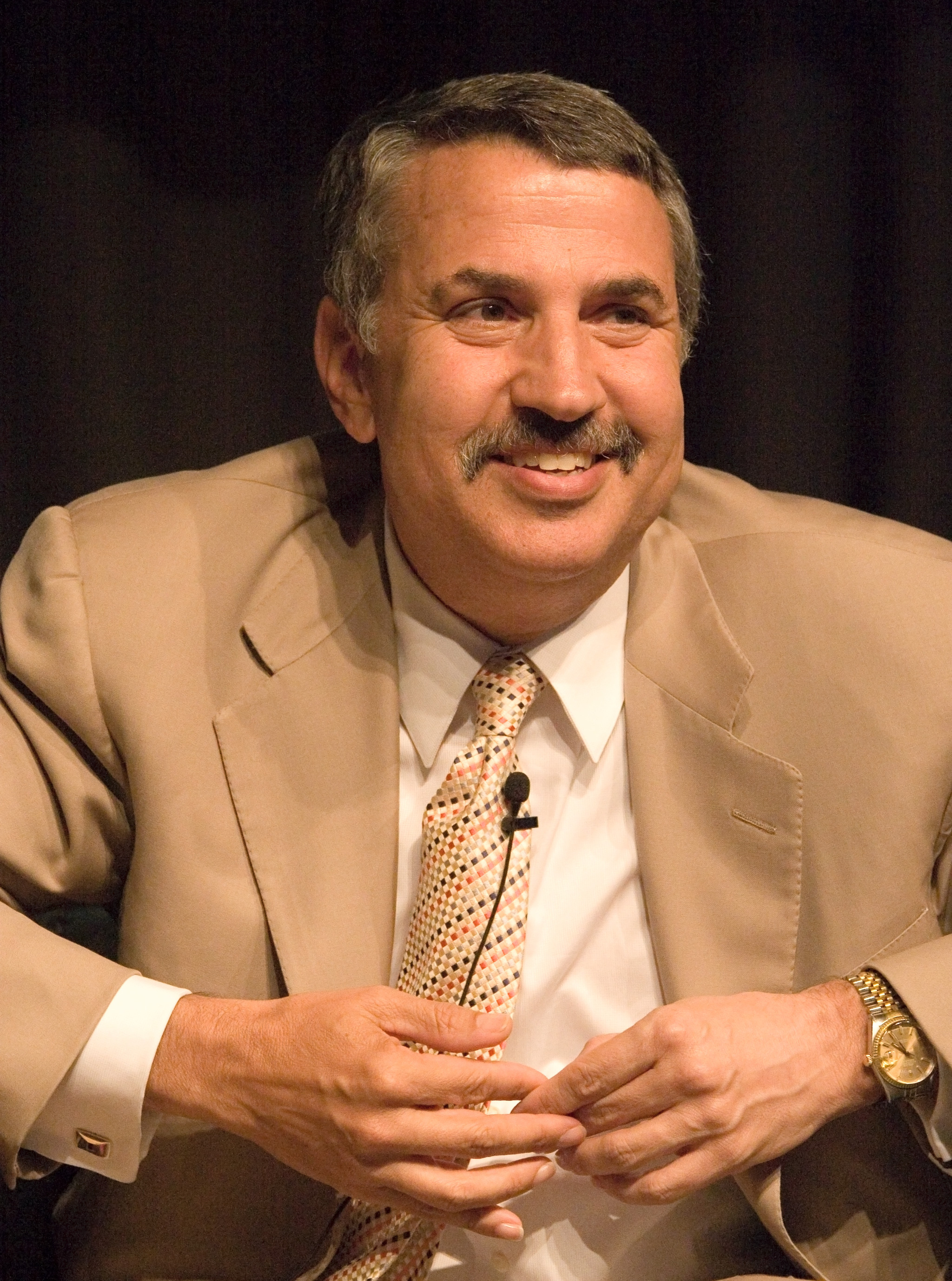
Thomas Friedman

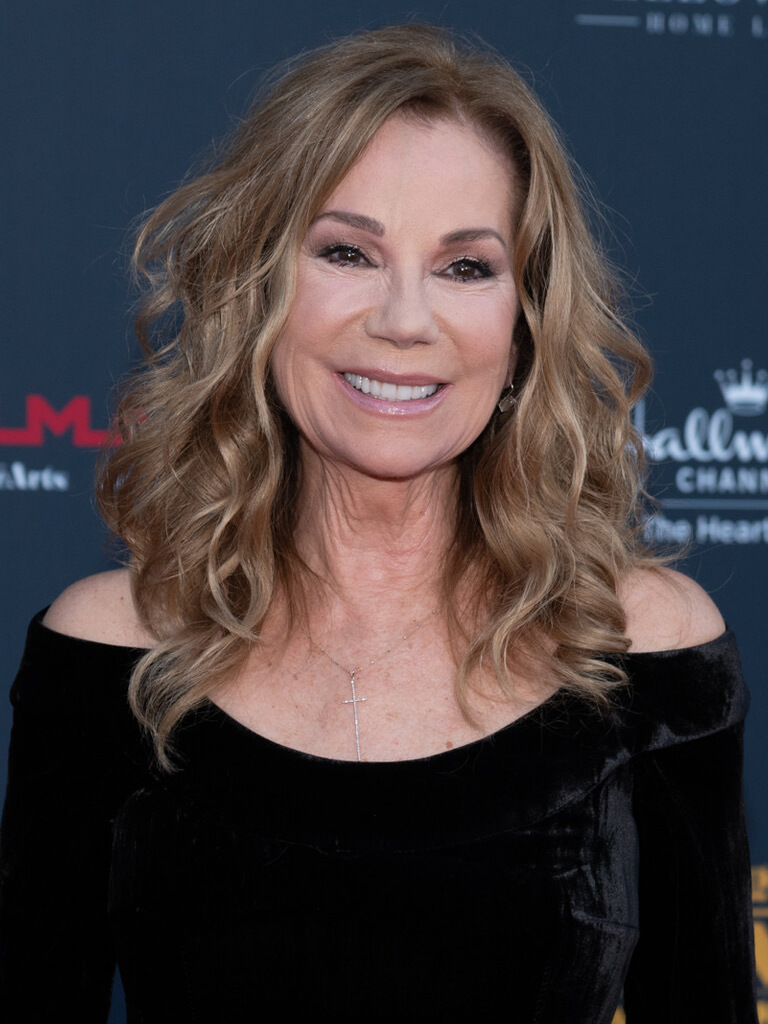
Kathie Lee Gifford

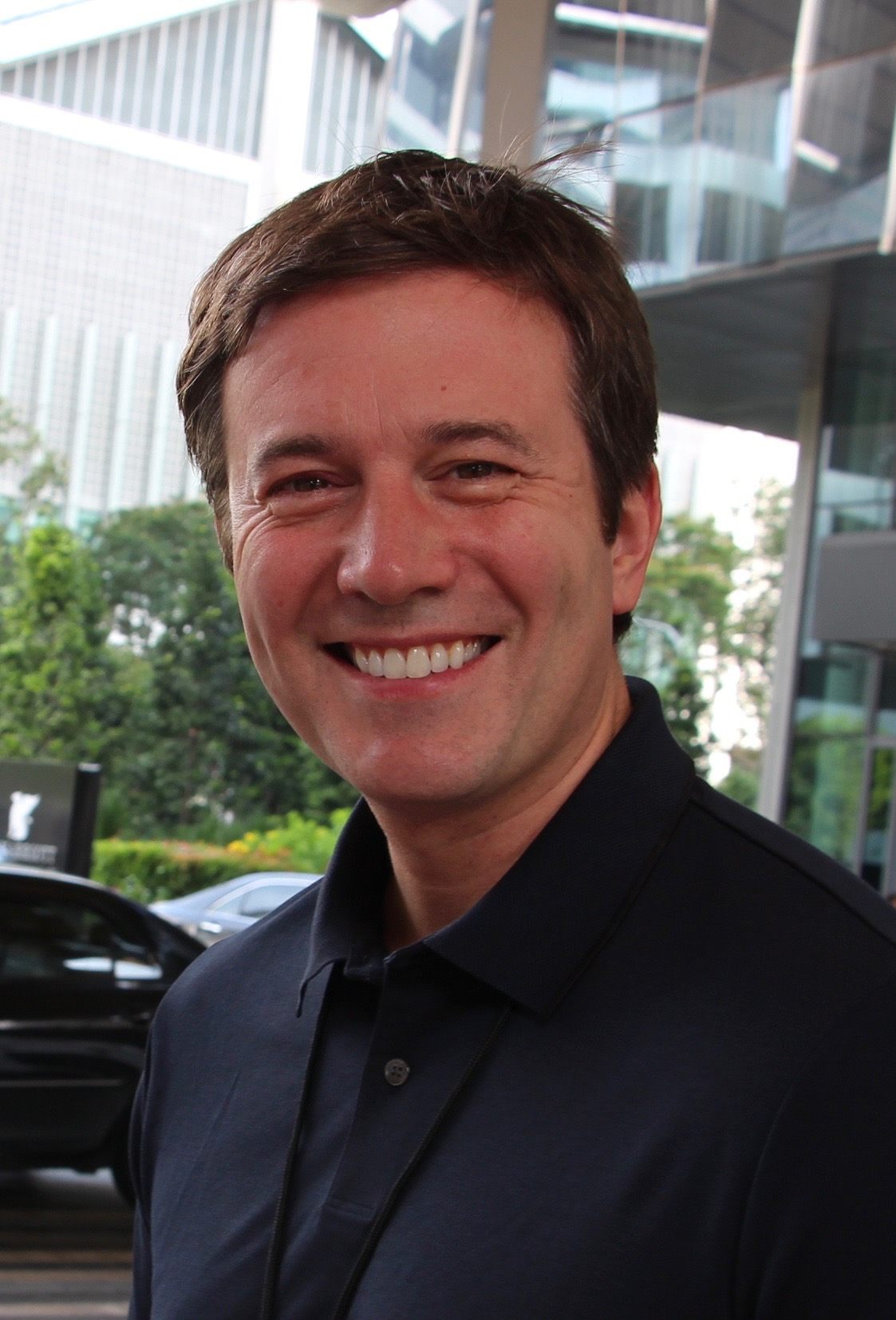
Jeff Glor

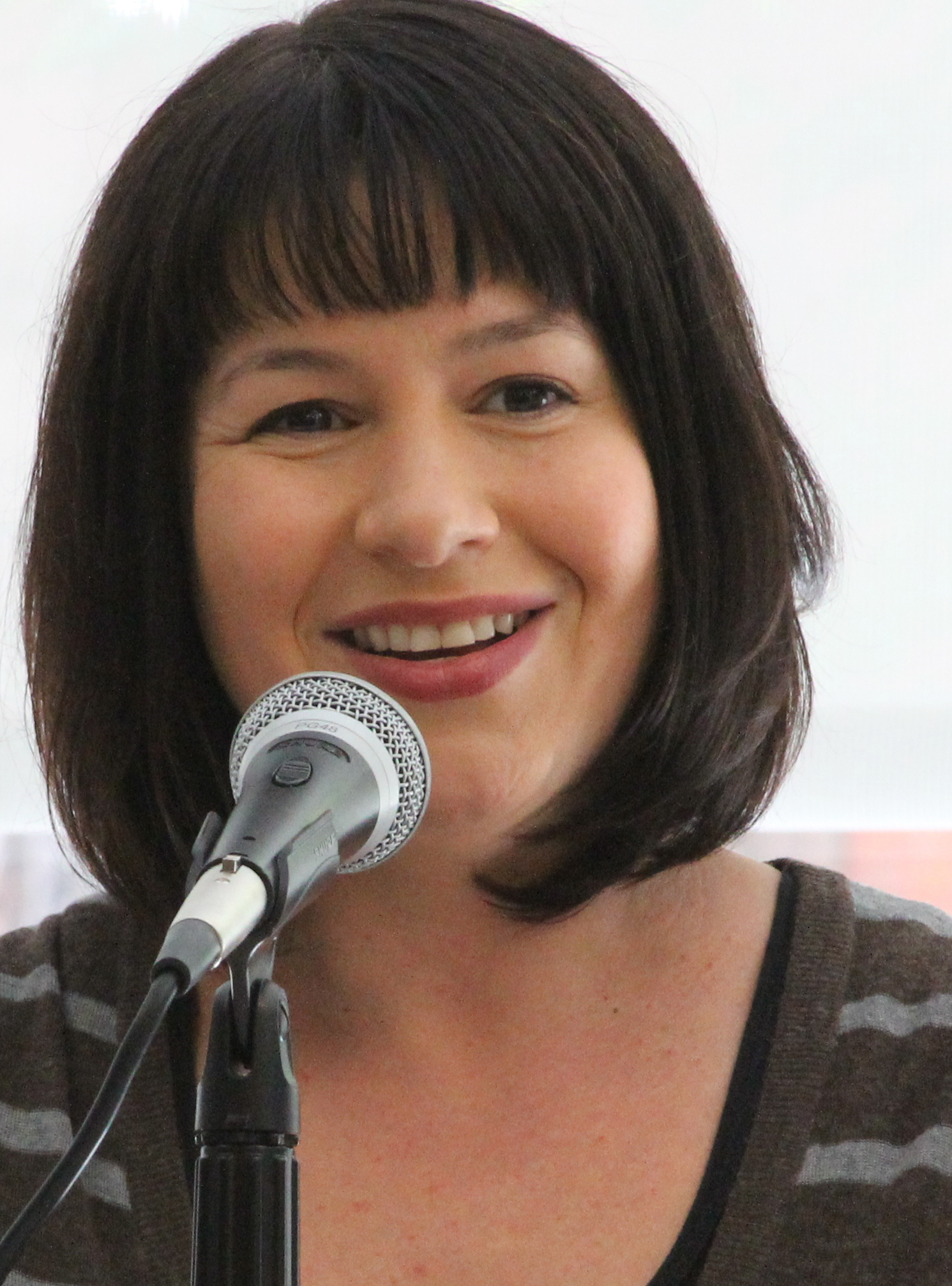
Michelle Goldberg

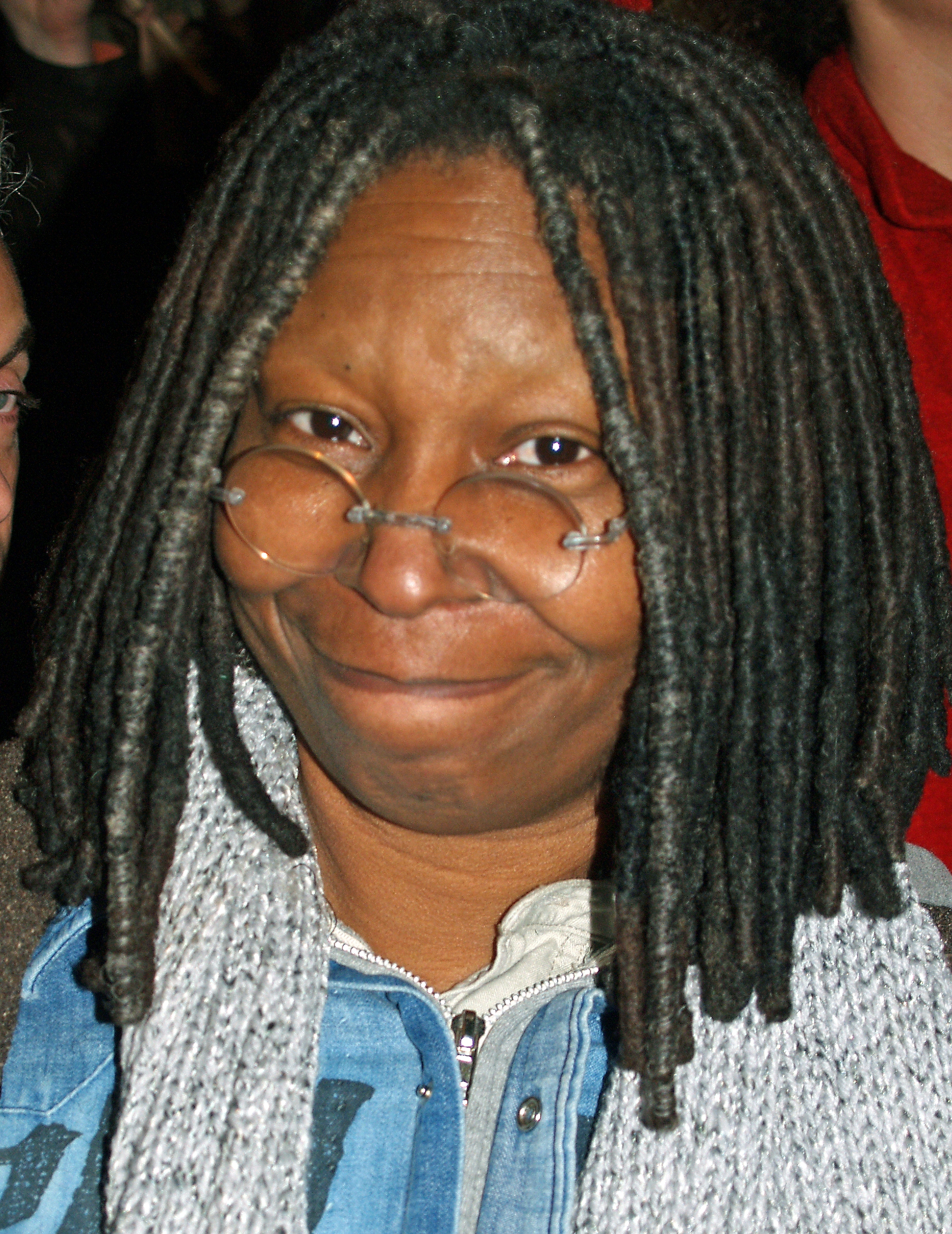
Whoopi Goldberg

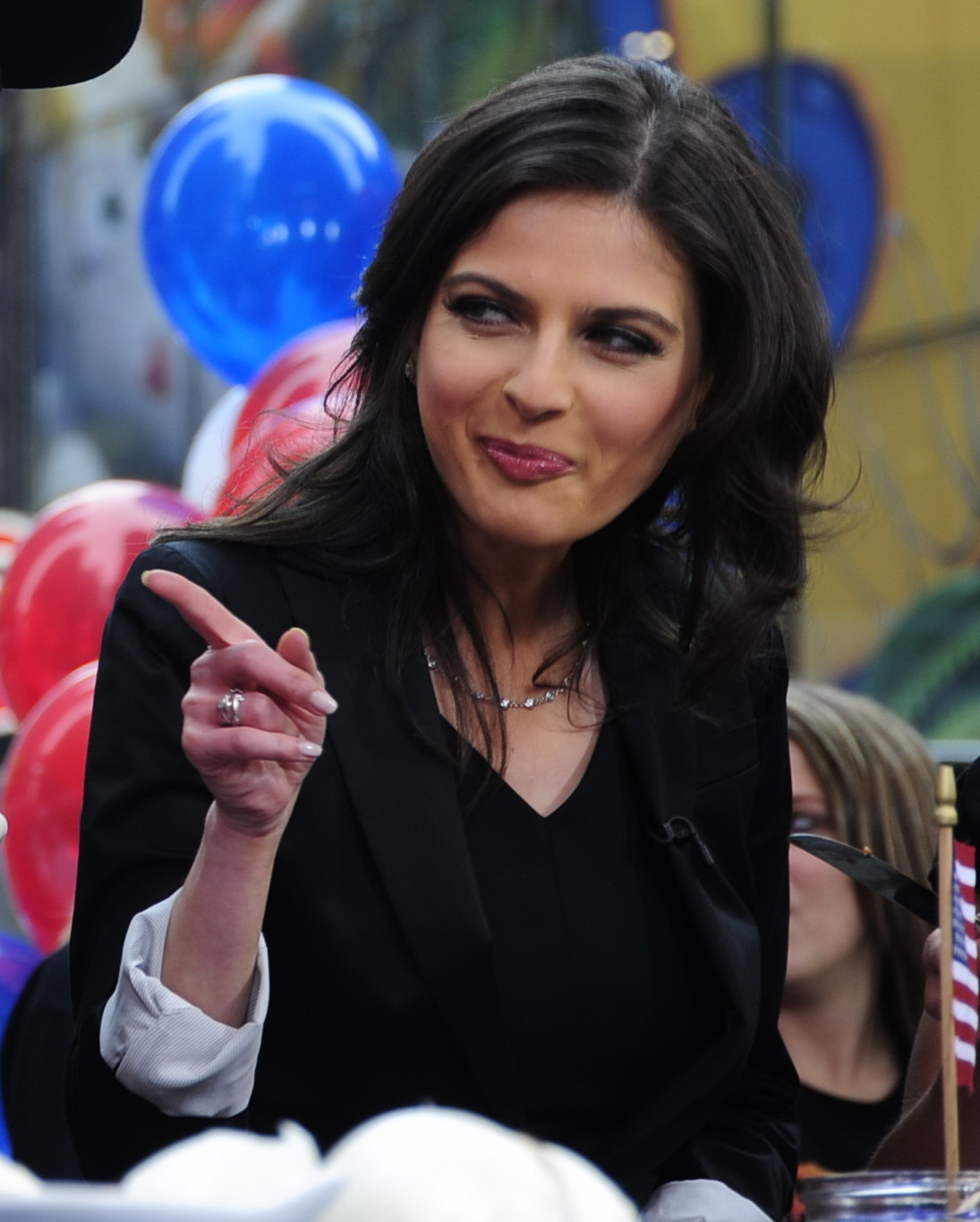
Bianna Golodryga

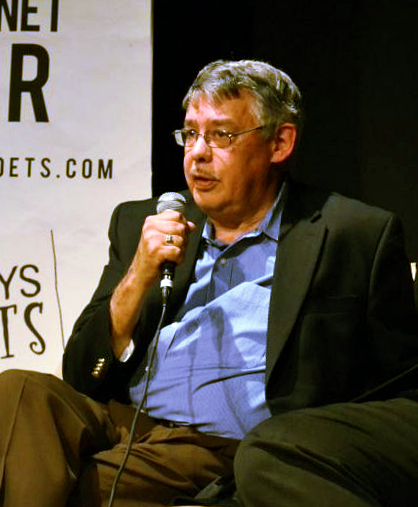
Juan González

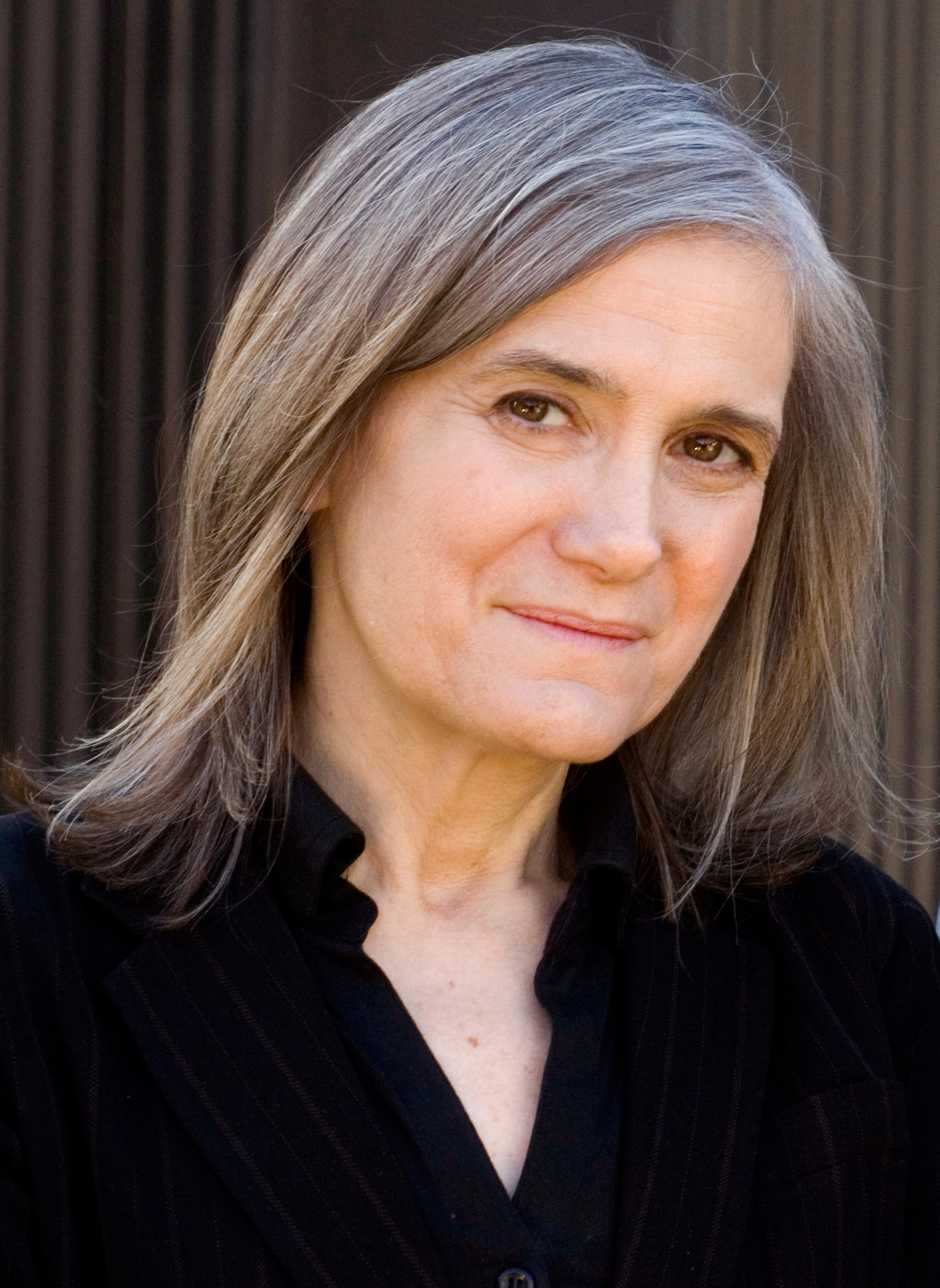
Amy Goodman

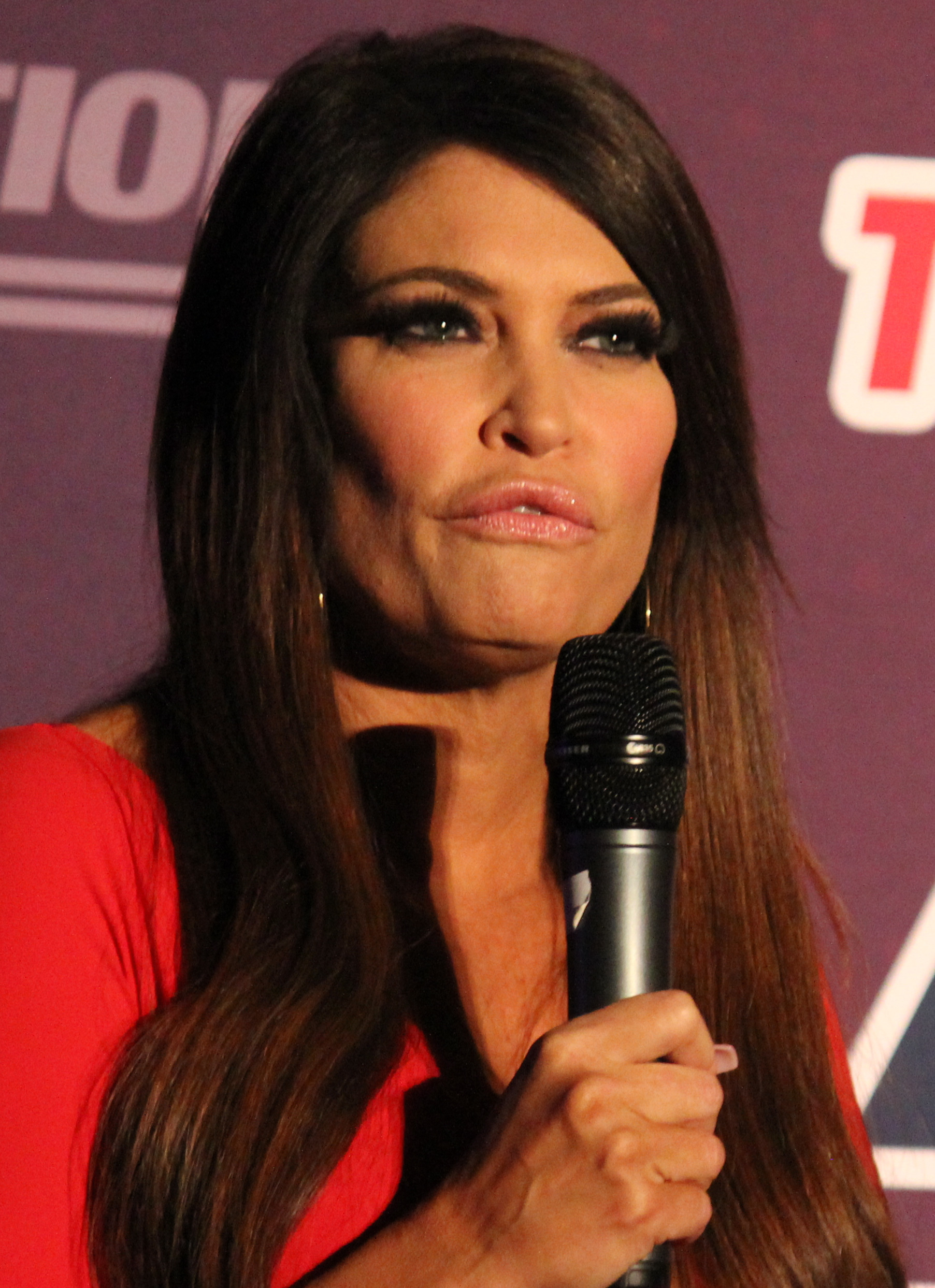
Kimberly Guilfoyle

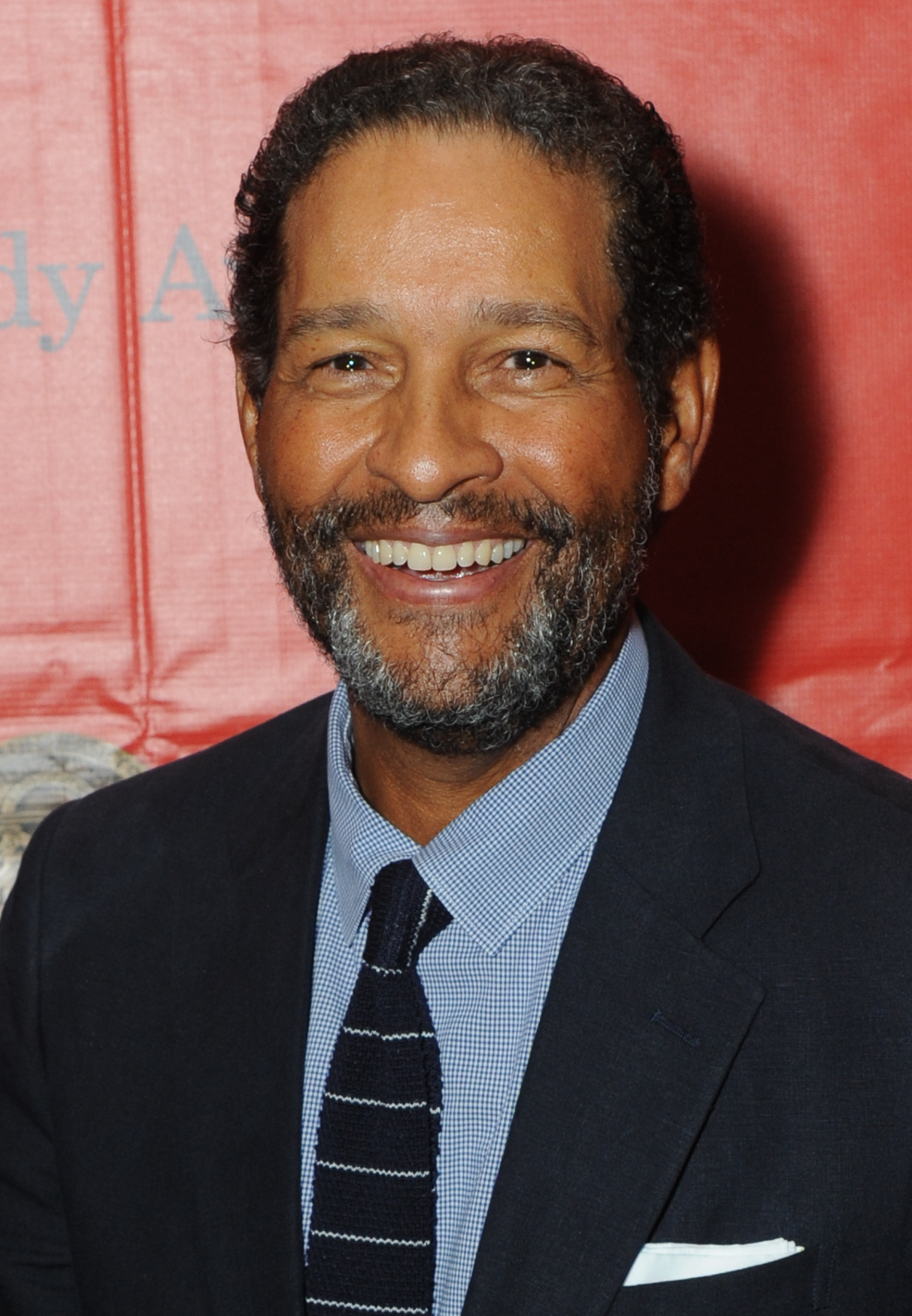
Bryant Gumbel

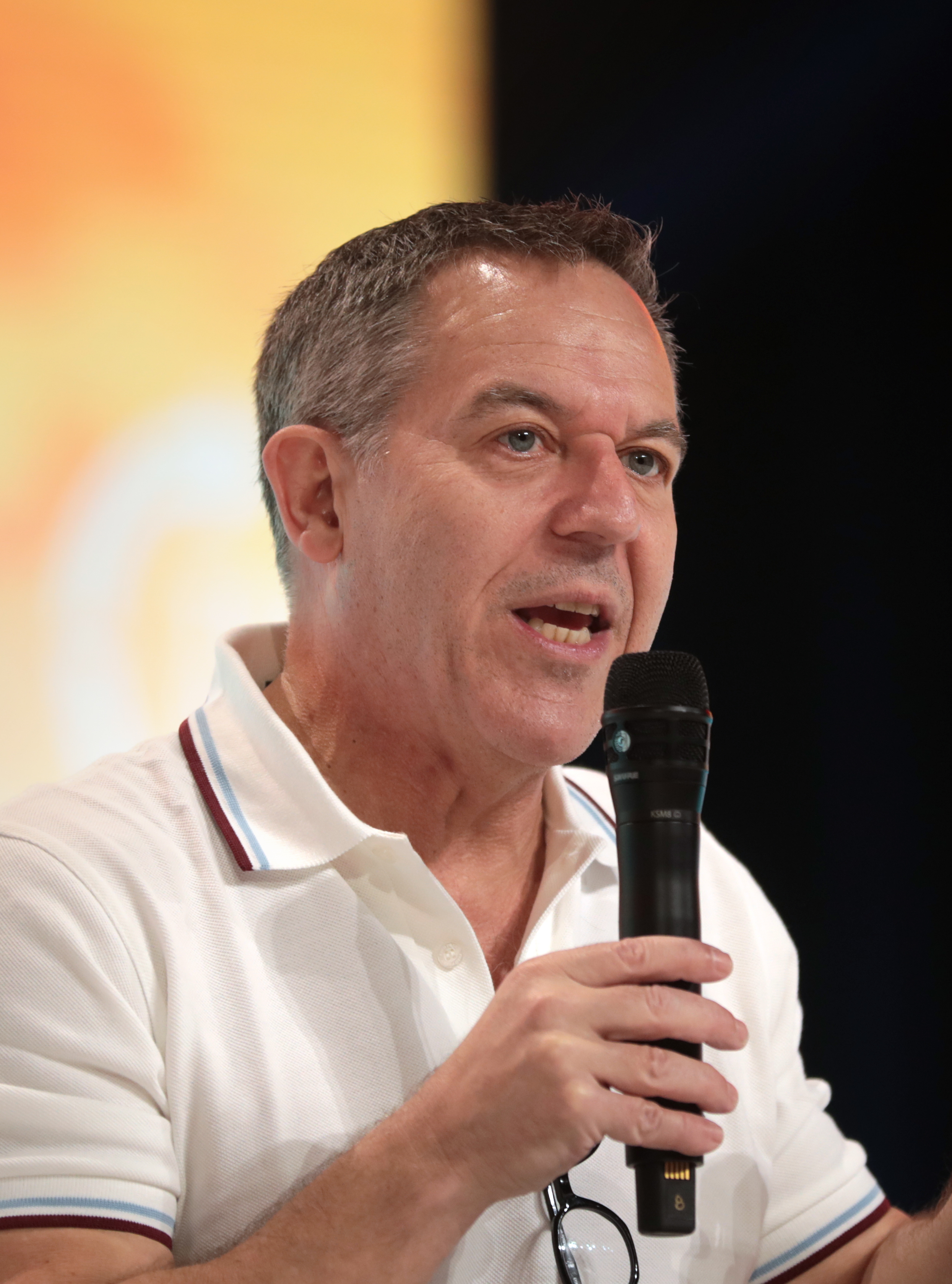
Greg Gutfeld

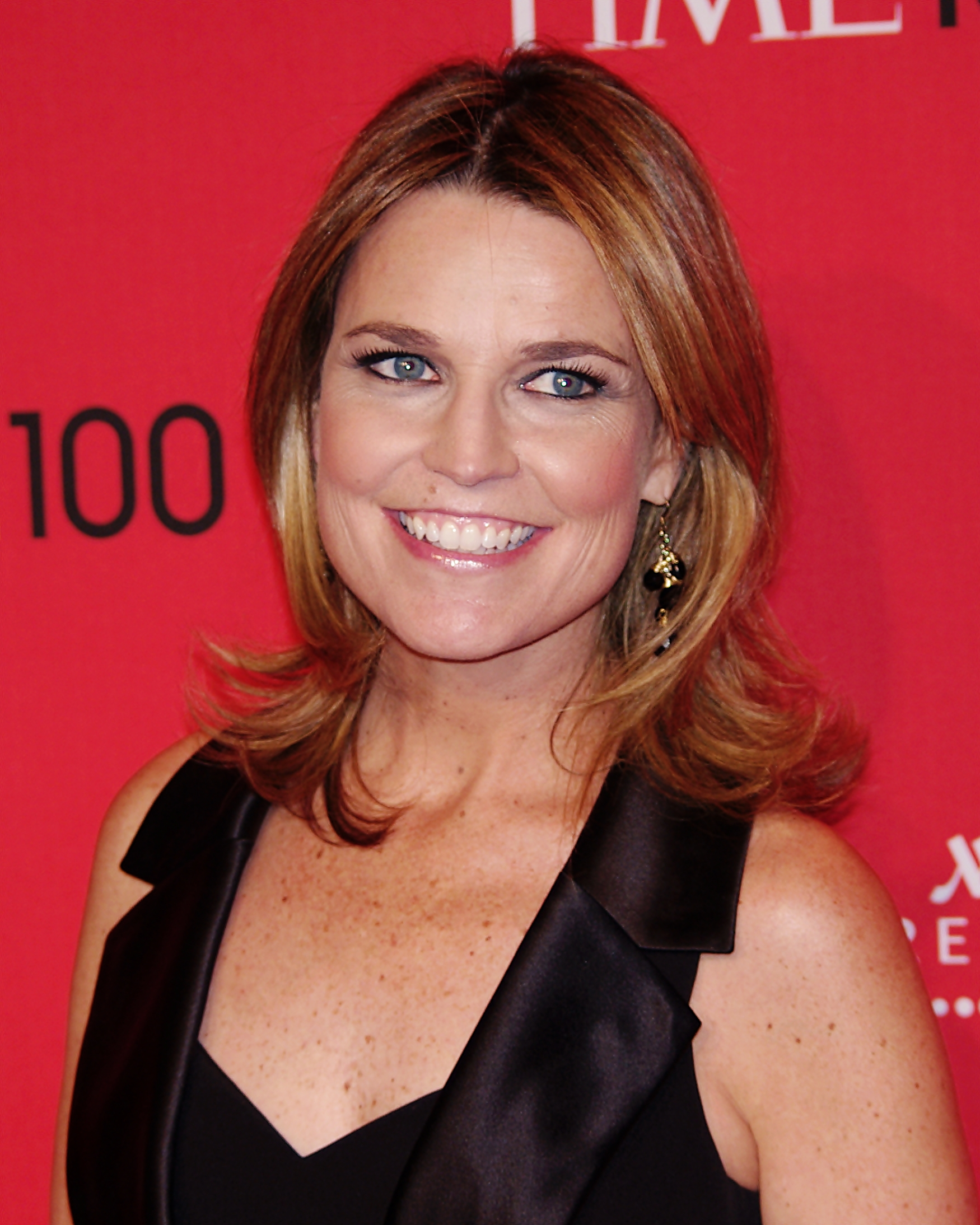
Savannah Guthrie

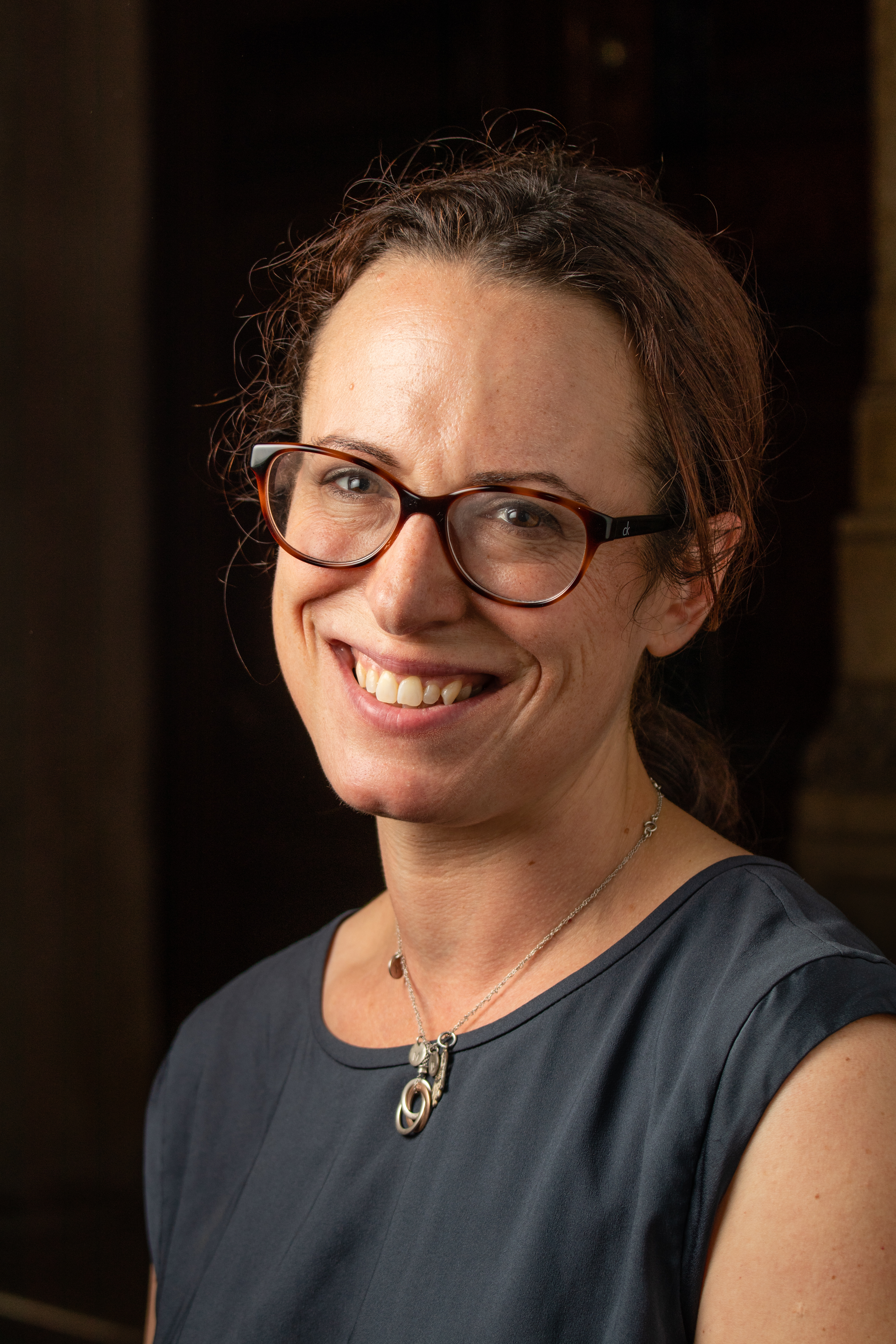
Maggie Haberman

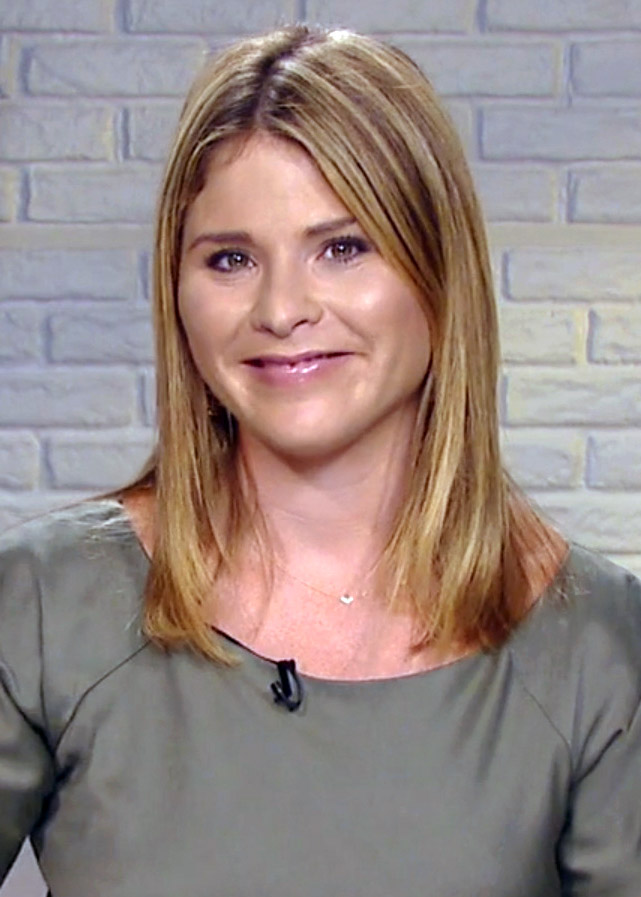
Jenna Bush Hager

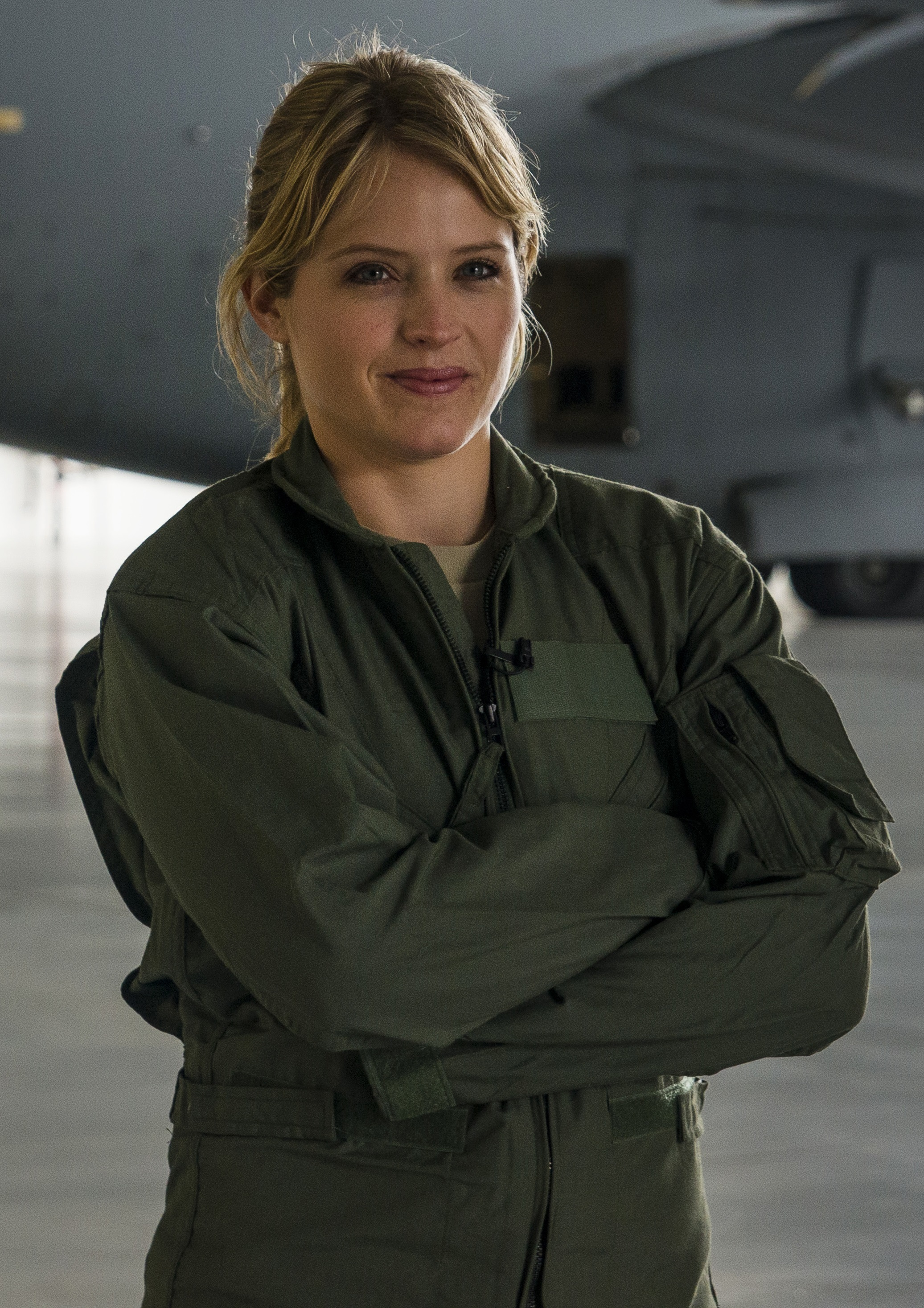
Sara Haines

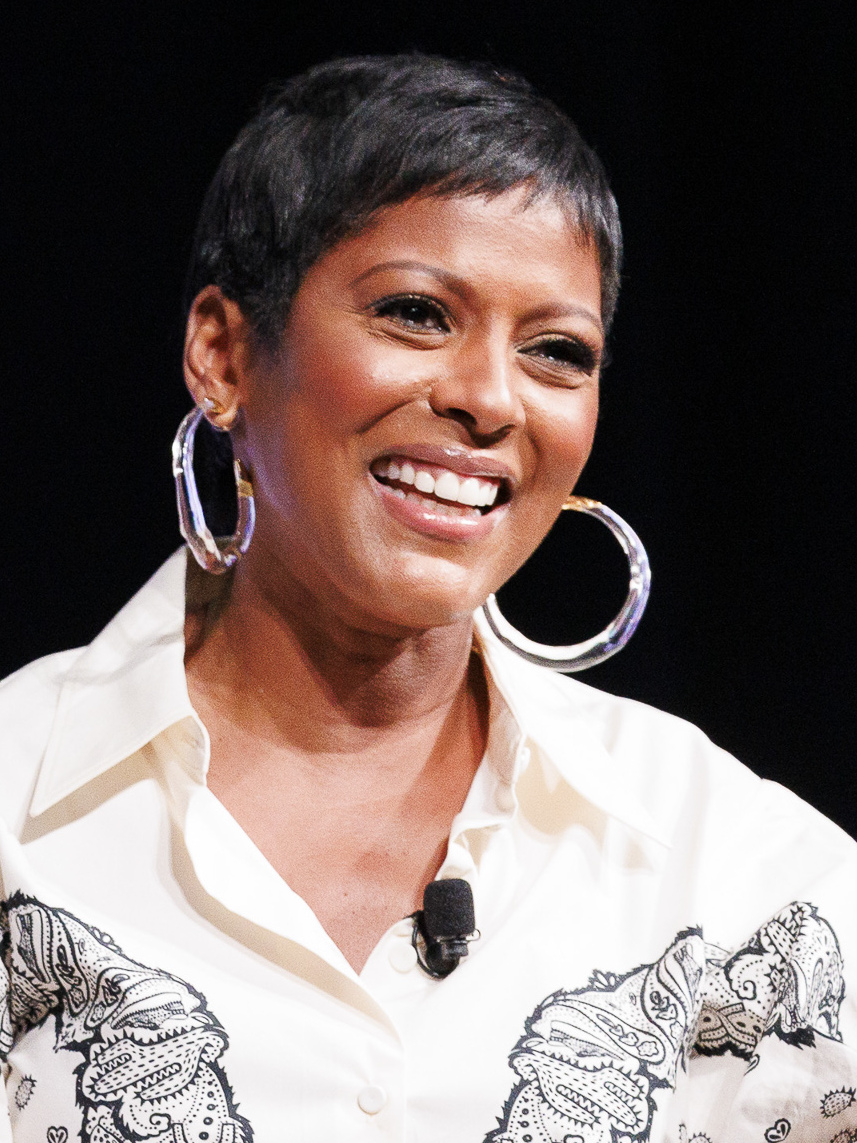
Tamron Hall

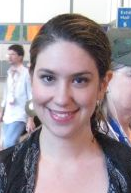
Katie Halper

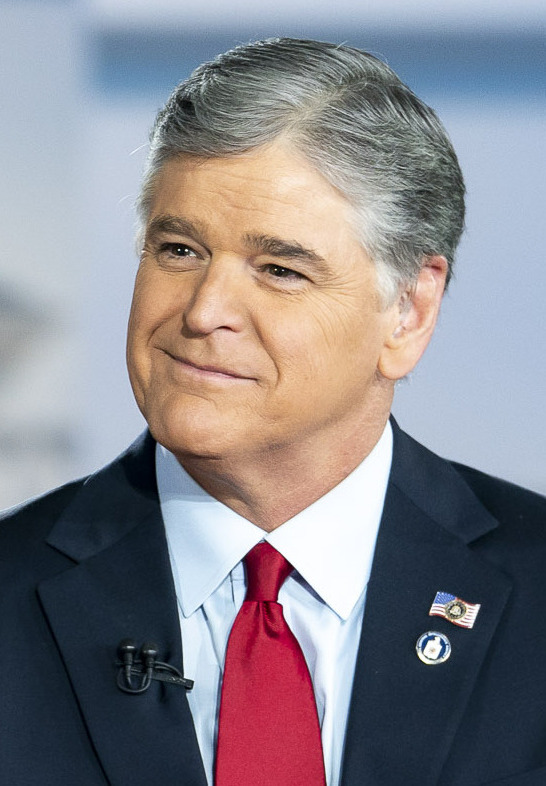
Sean Hannity

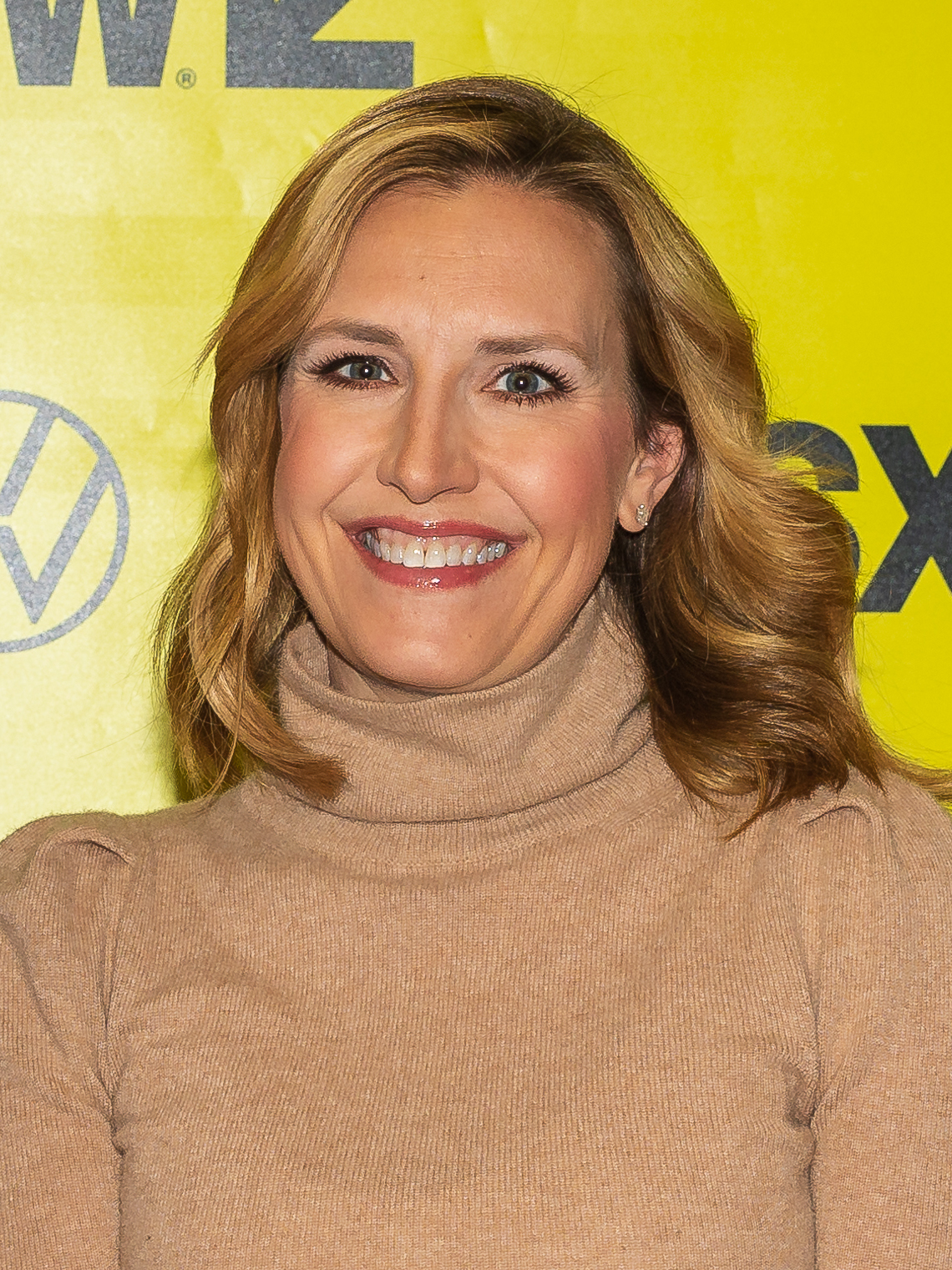
Poppy Harlow

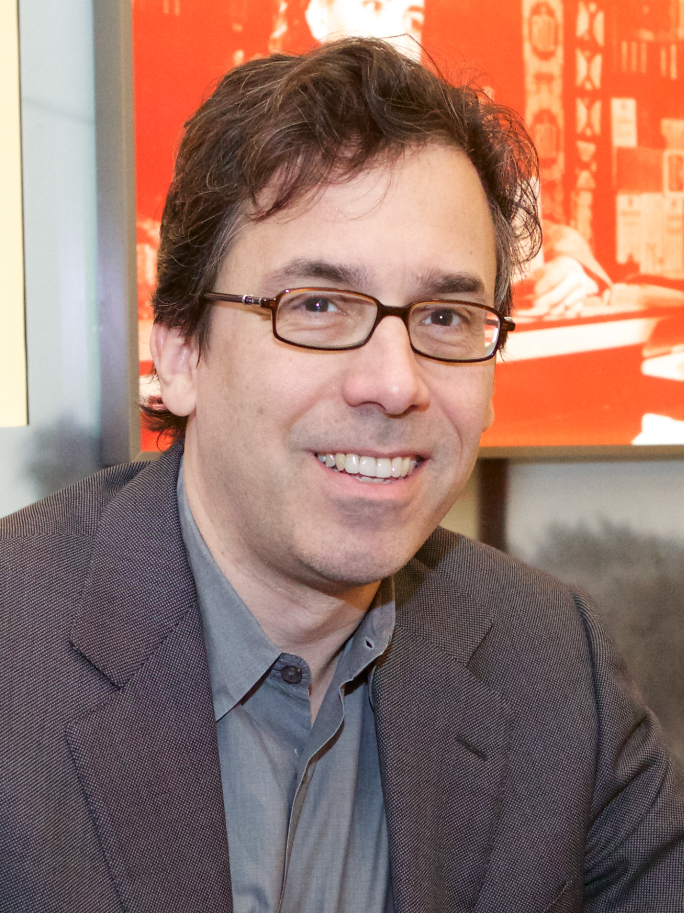
Mark Harris

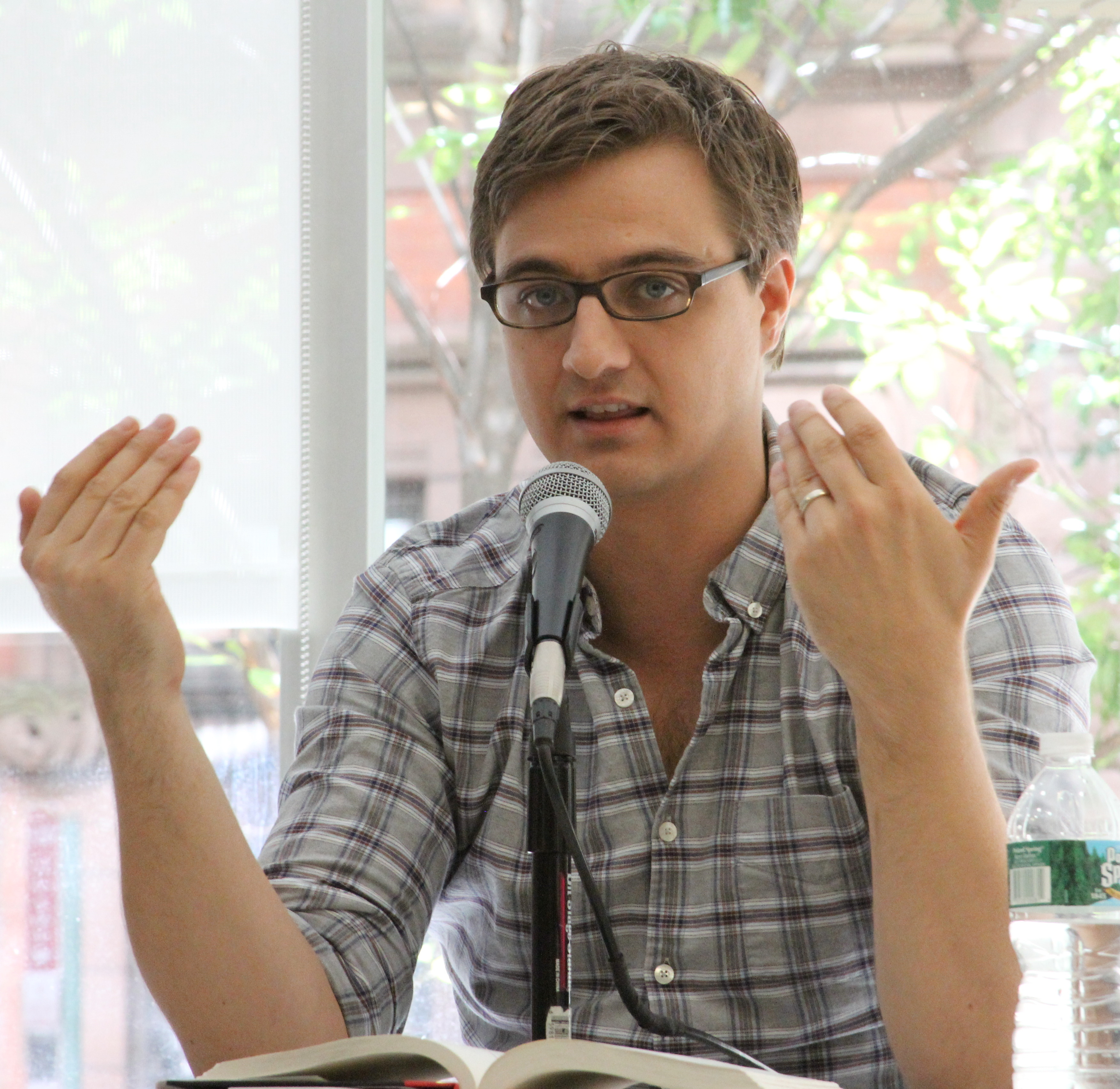
Chris Hayes

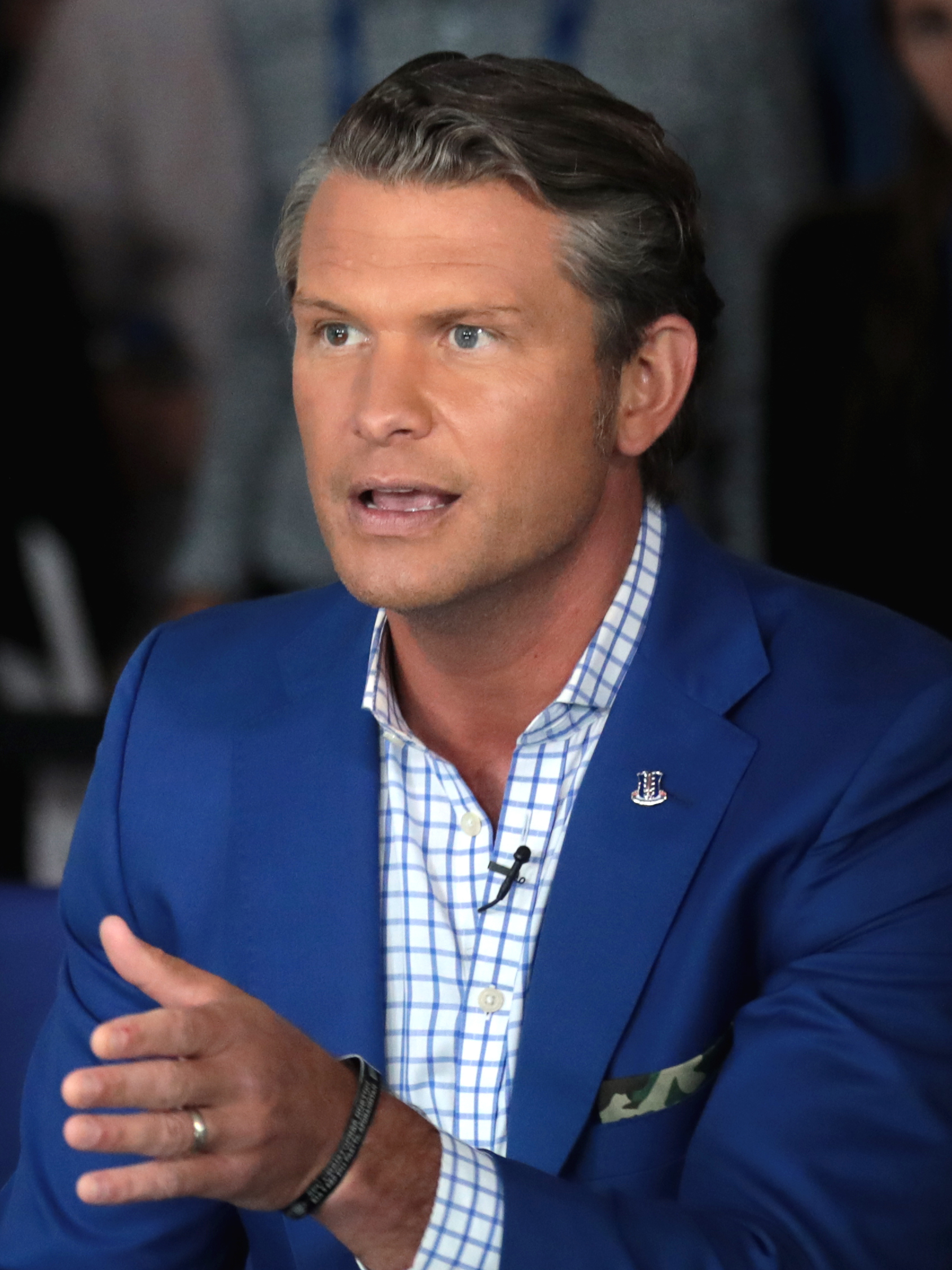
Pete Hegseth

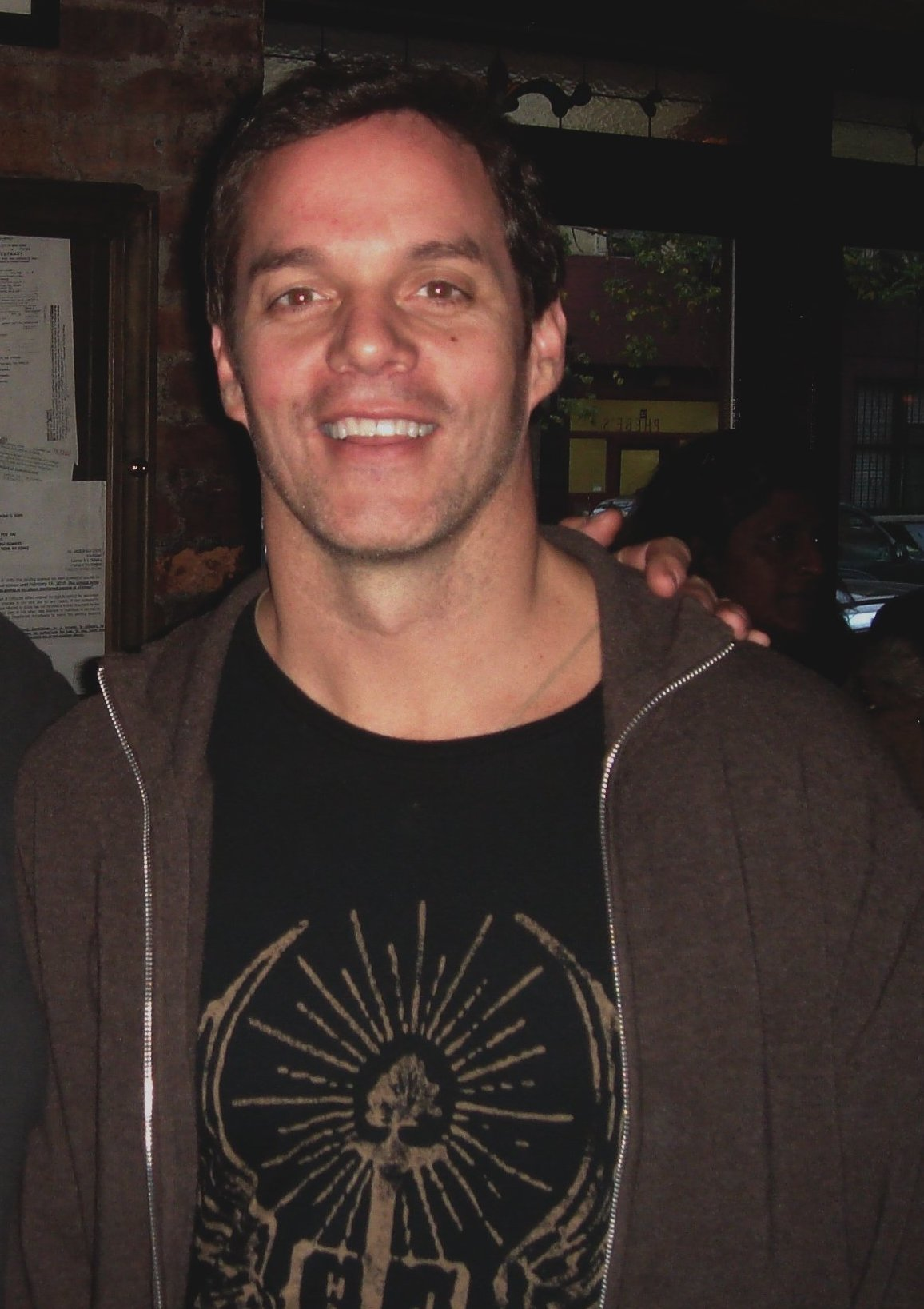
Bill Hemmer

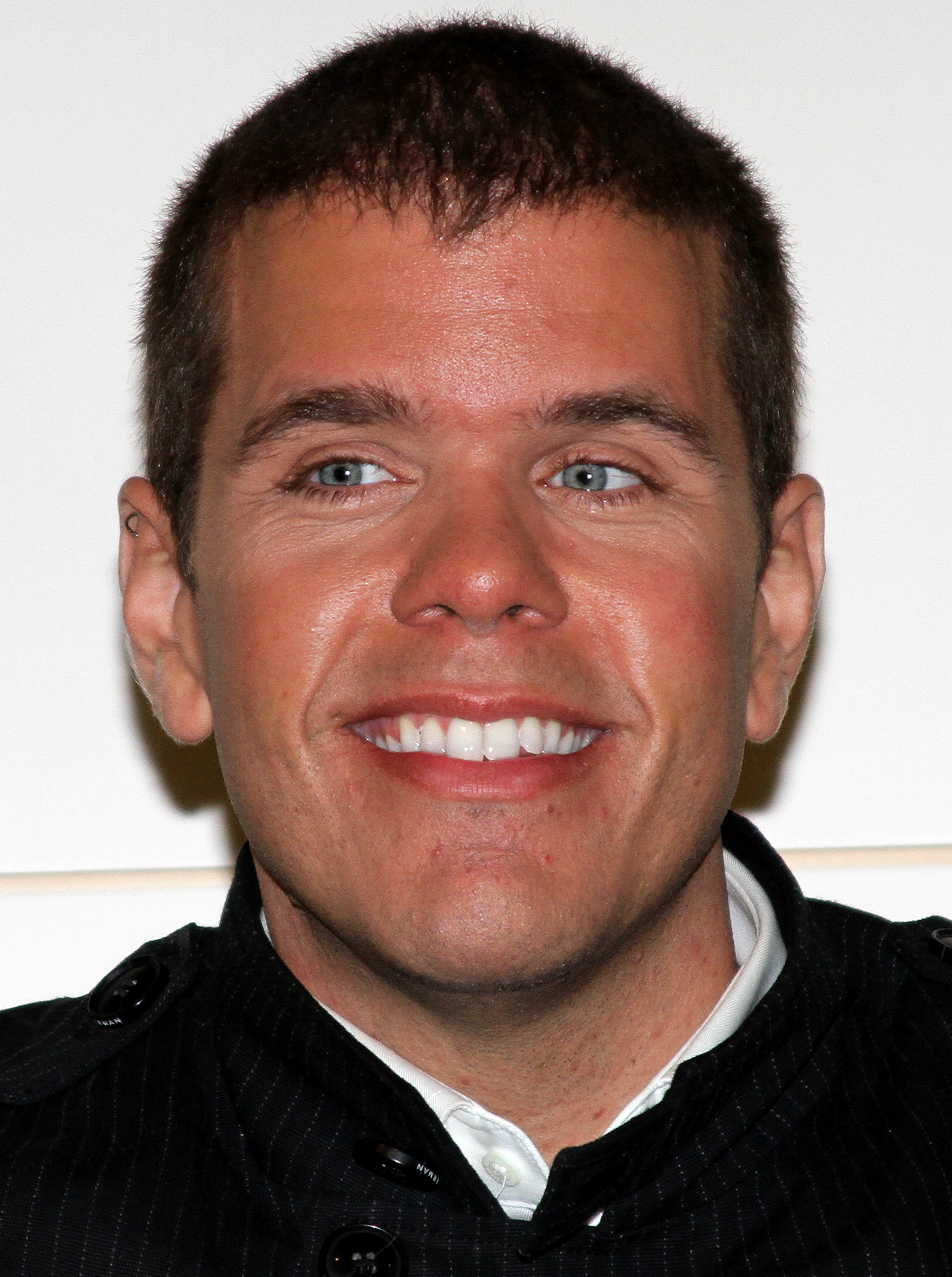
Perez Hilton

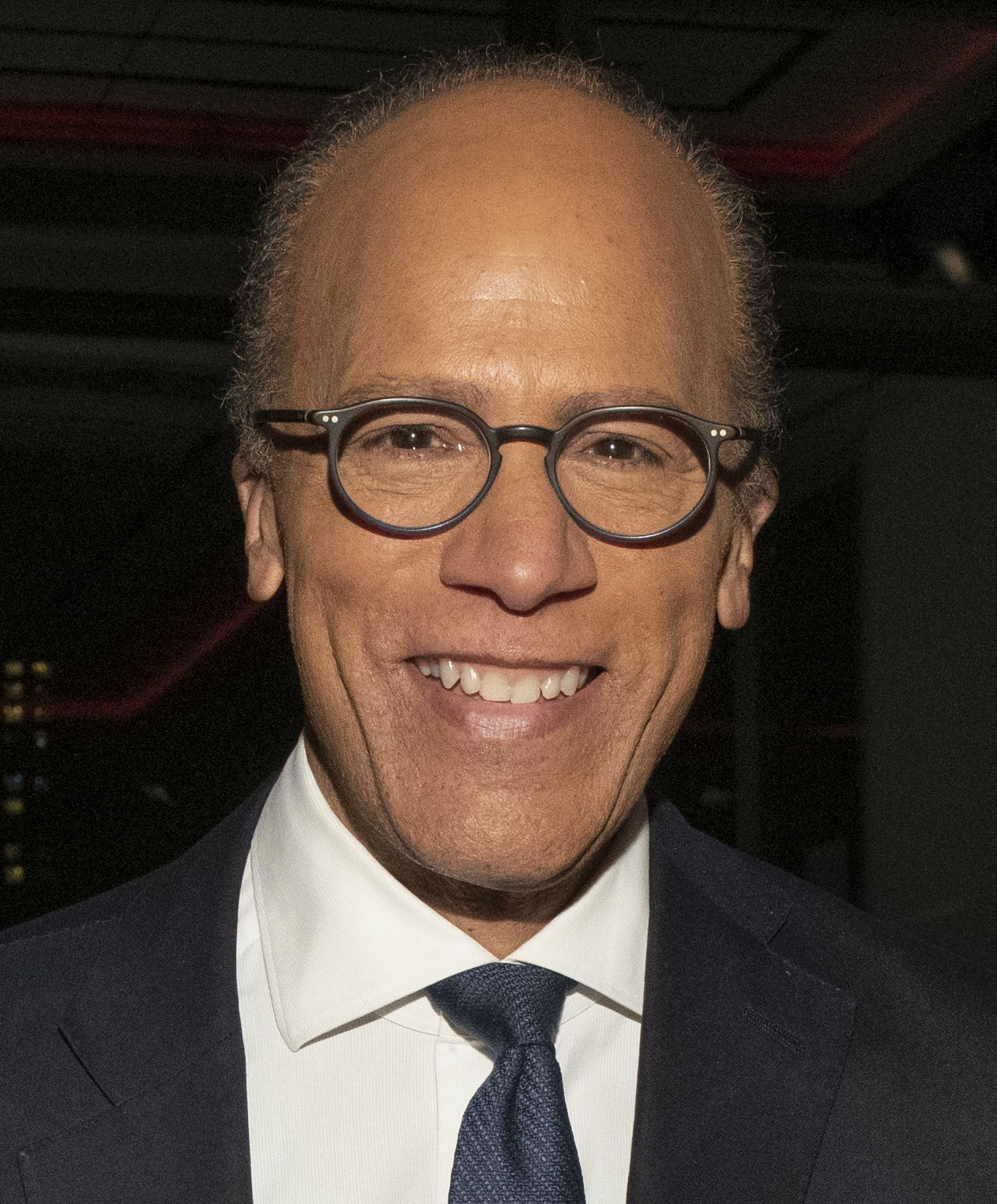
Lester Holt

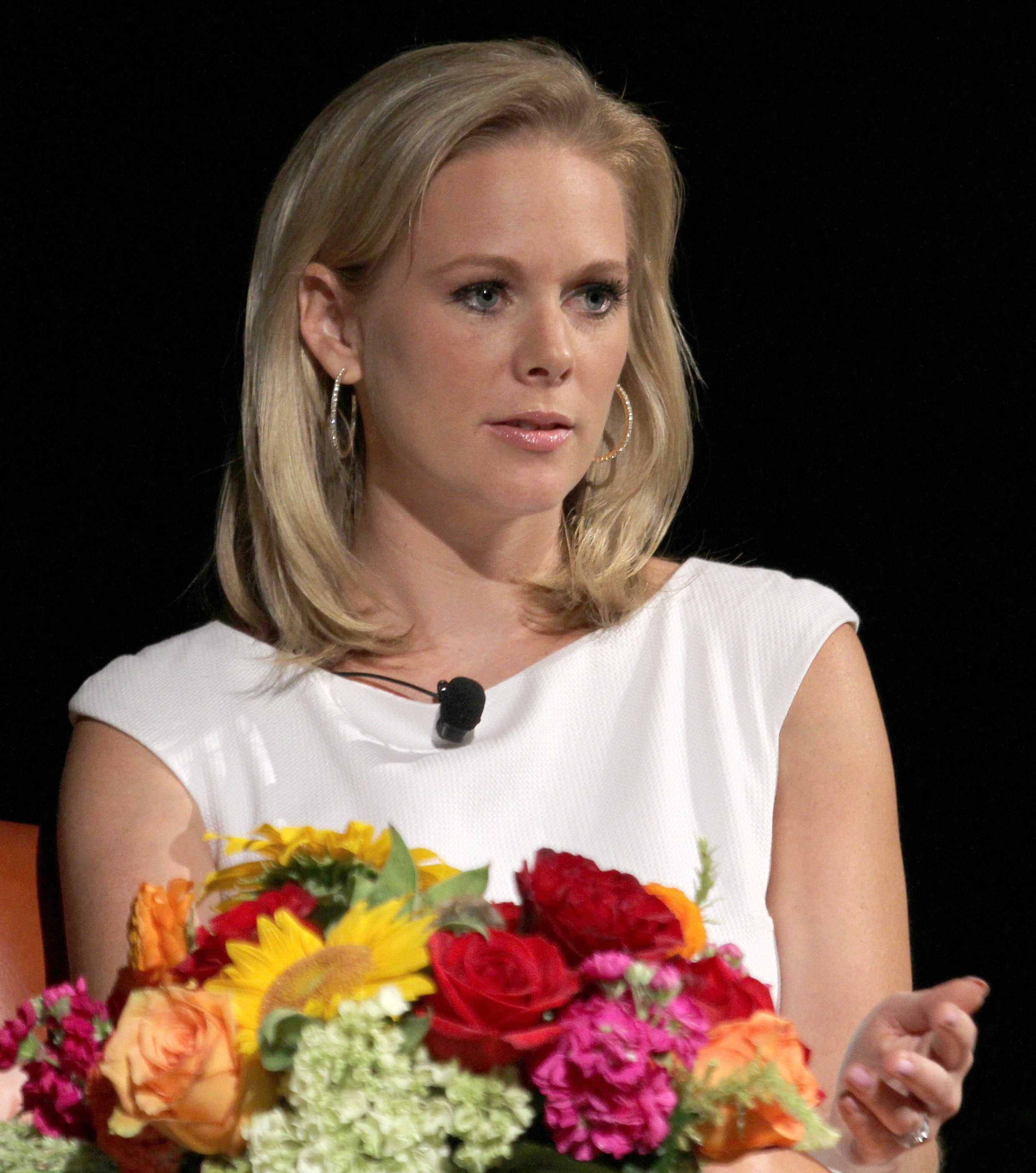
Margaret Hoover

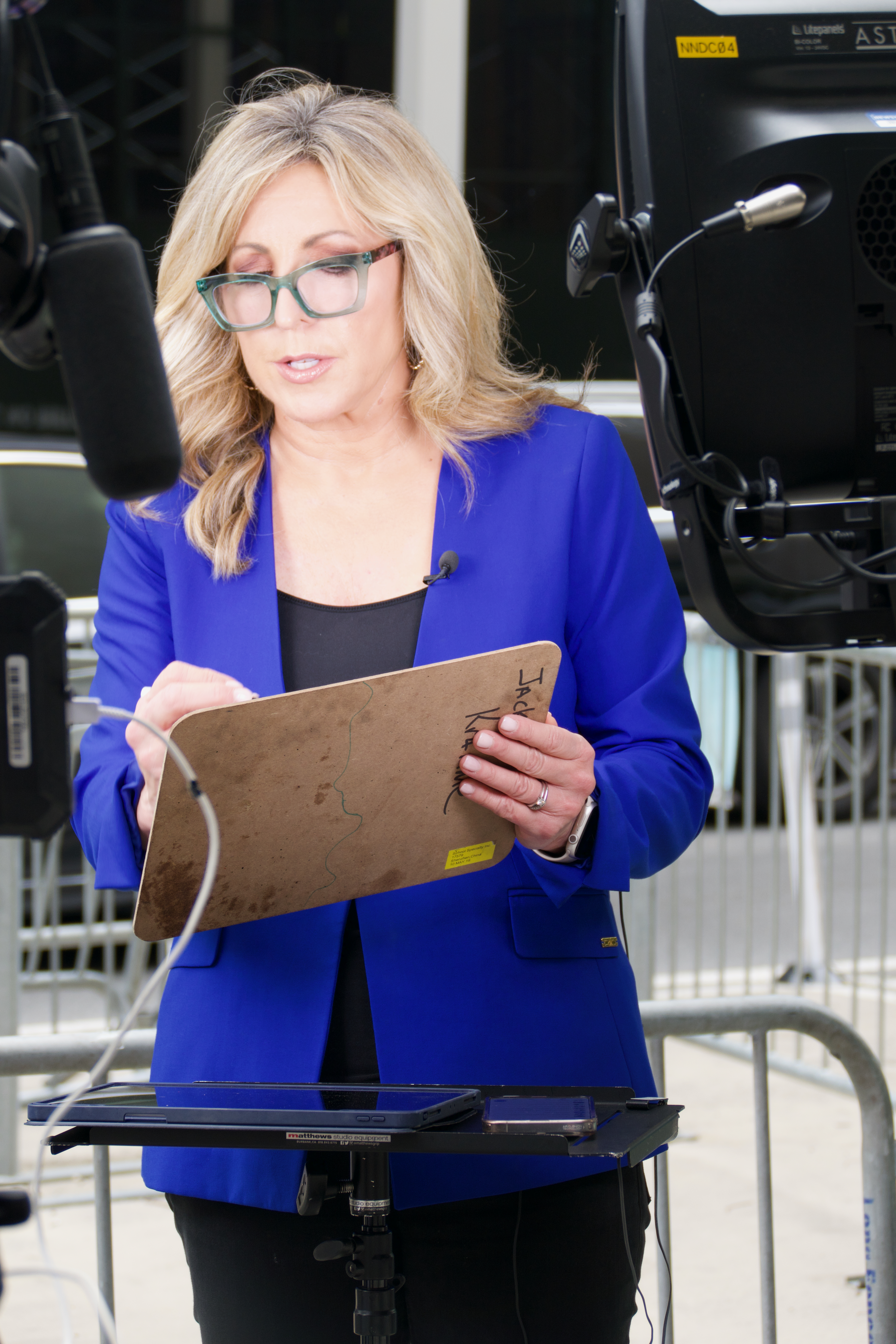
Laura Ingle

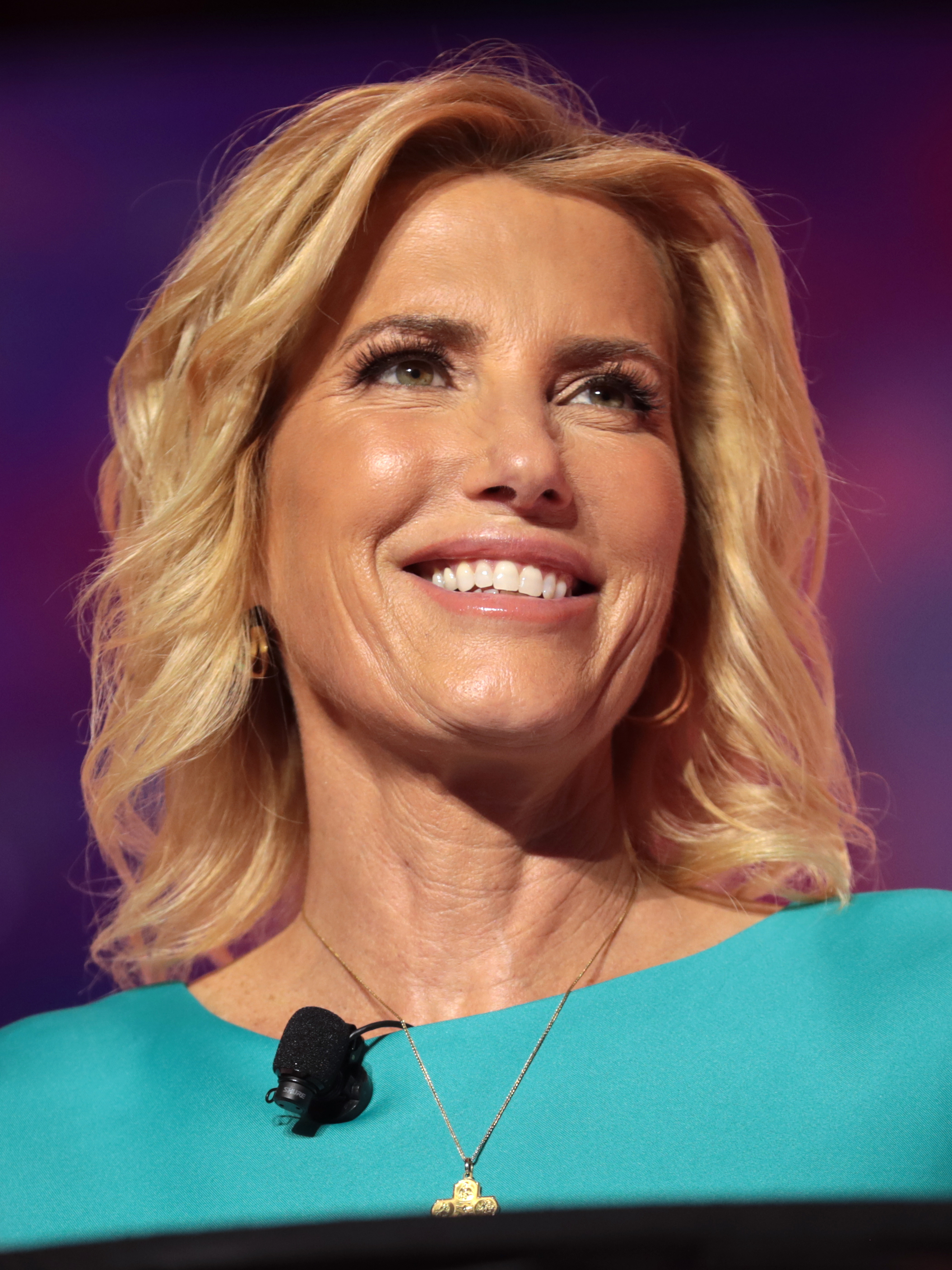
Laura Ingraham

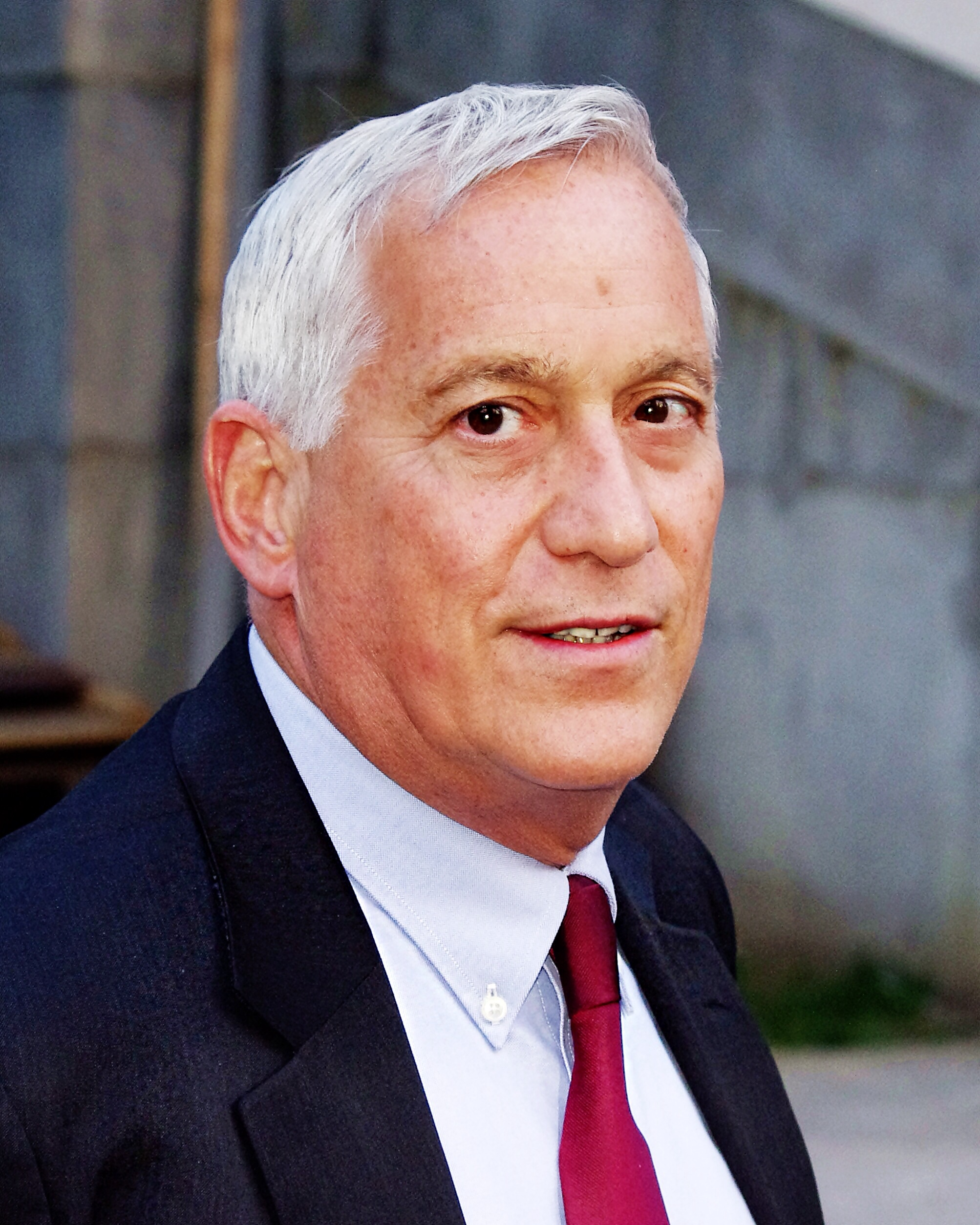
Walter Isaacson

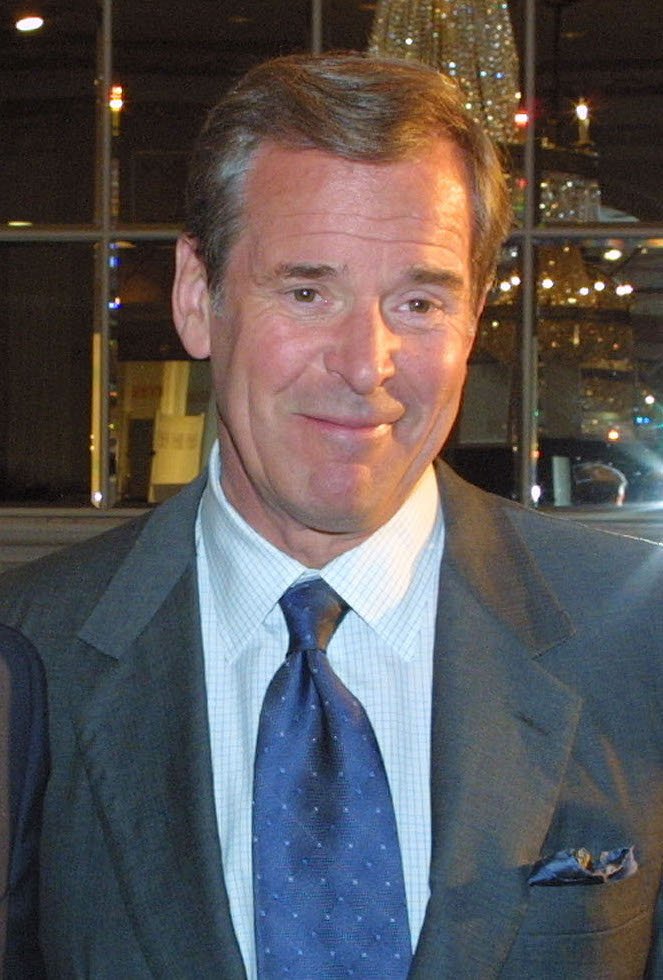
Peter Jennings

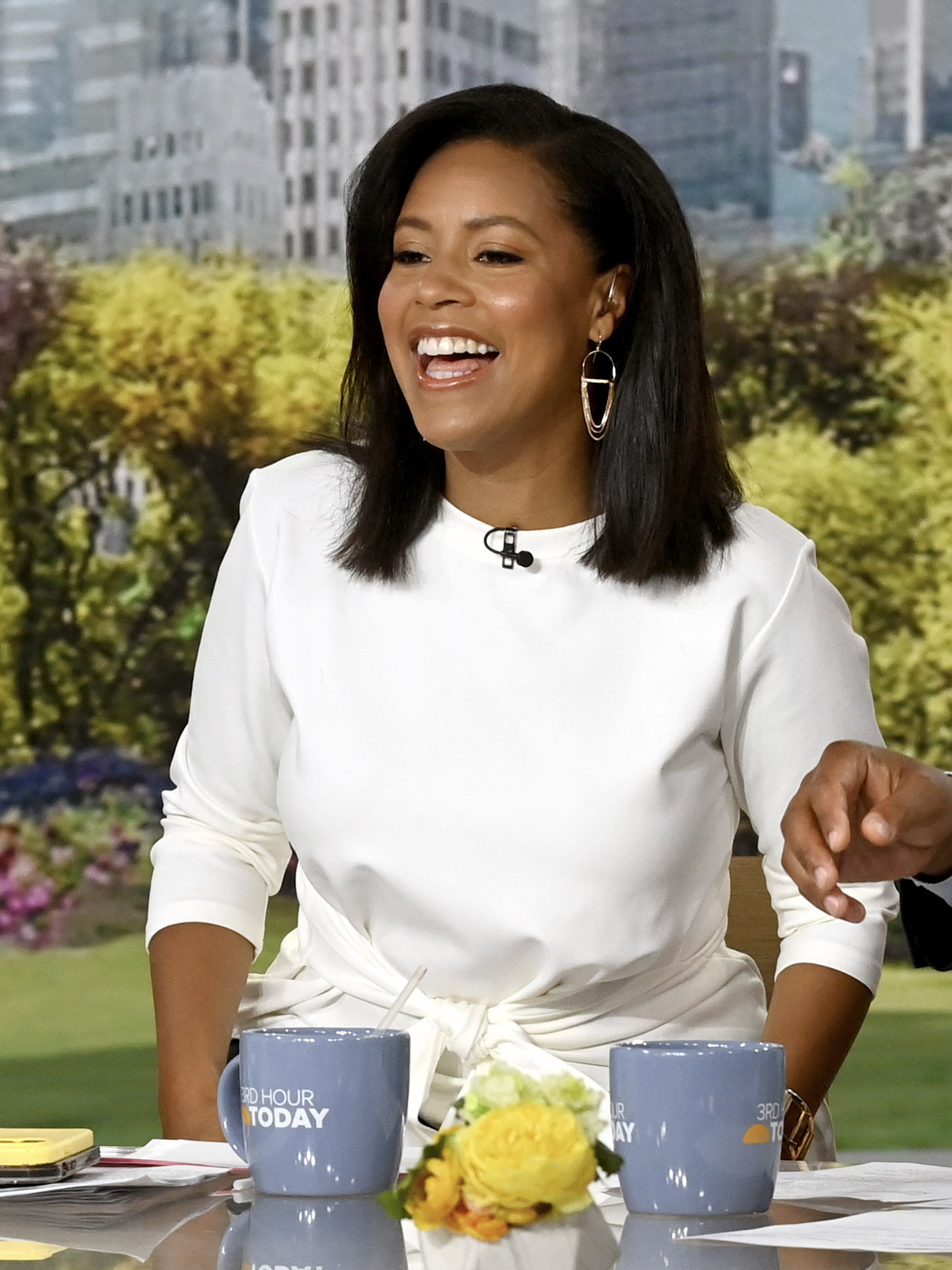
Sheinelle Jones

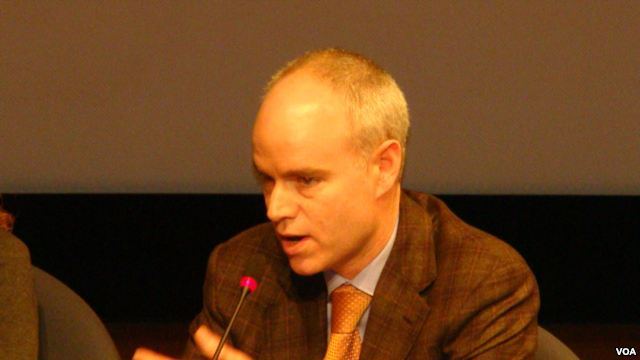
Joseph Kahn

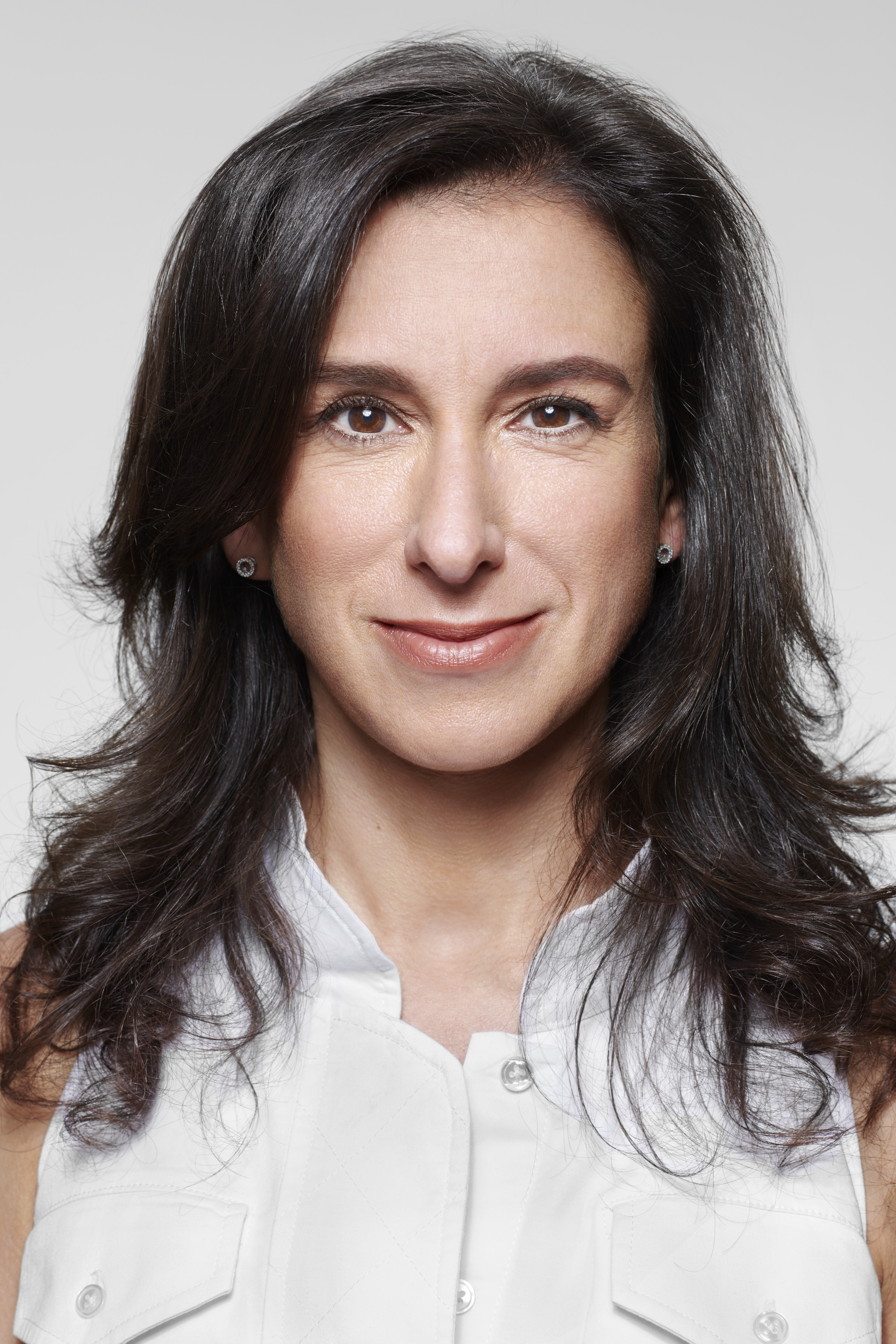
Jodi Kantor

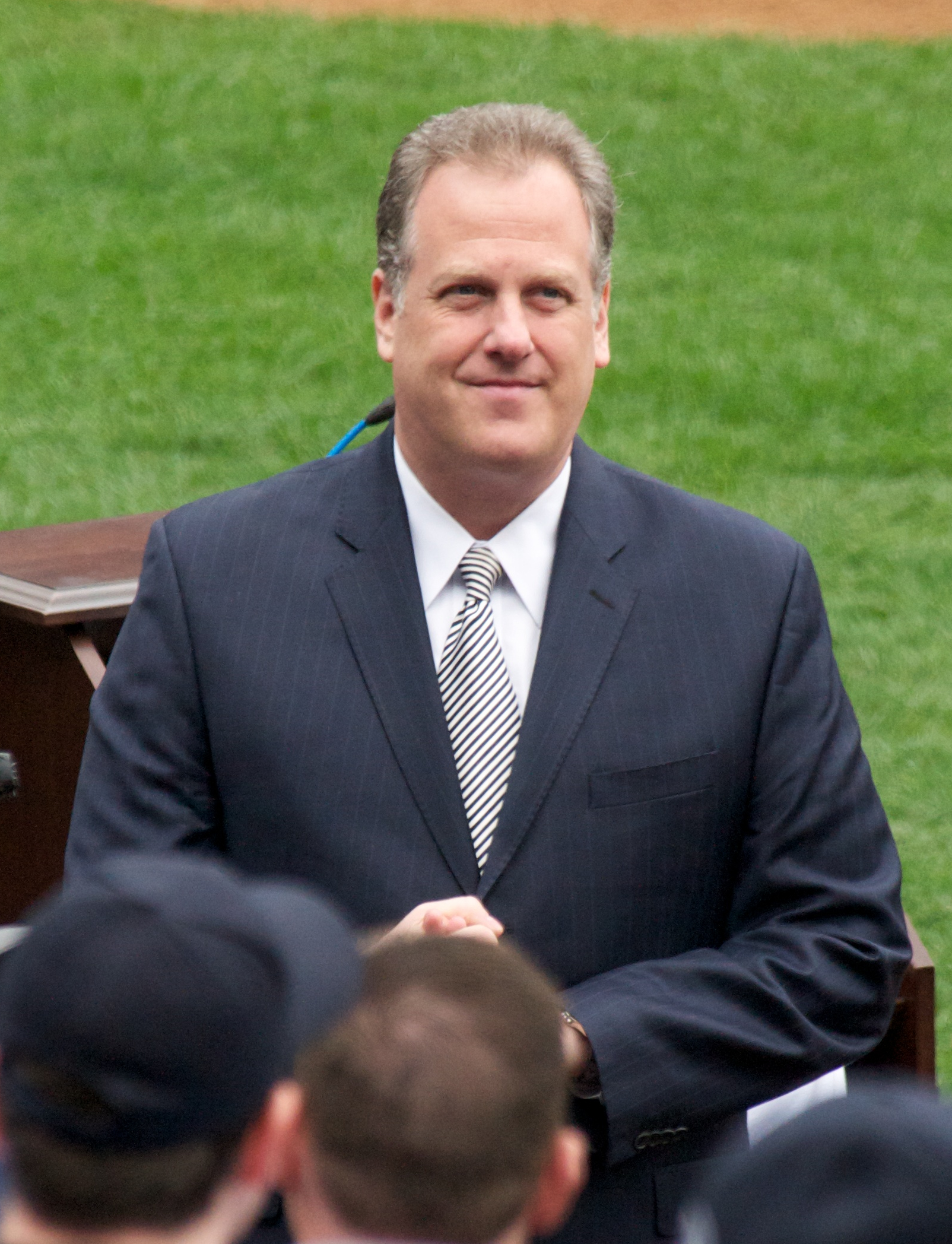
Michael Kay

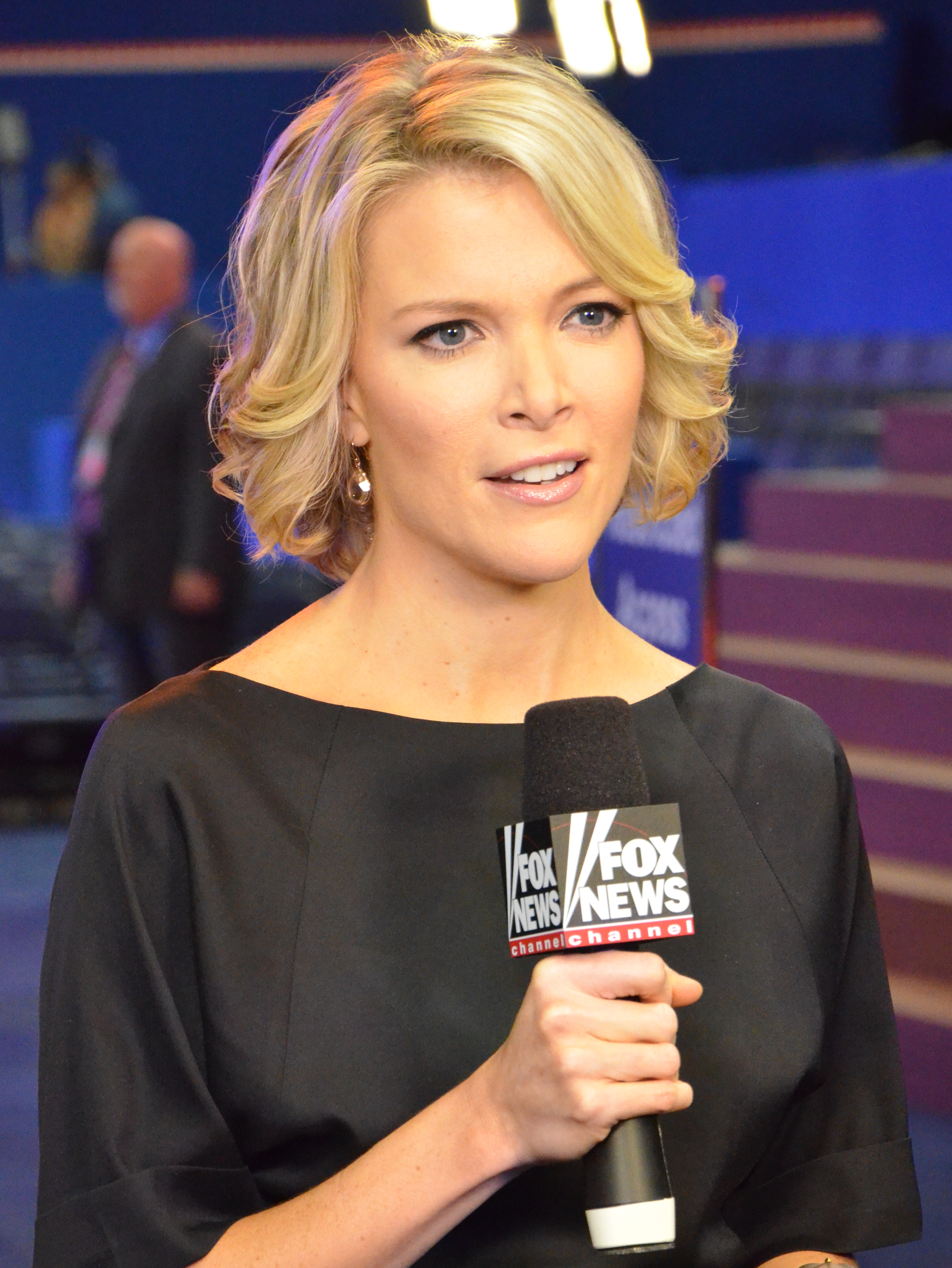
Megyn Kelly

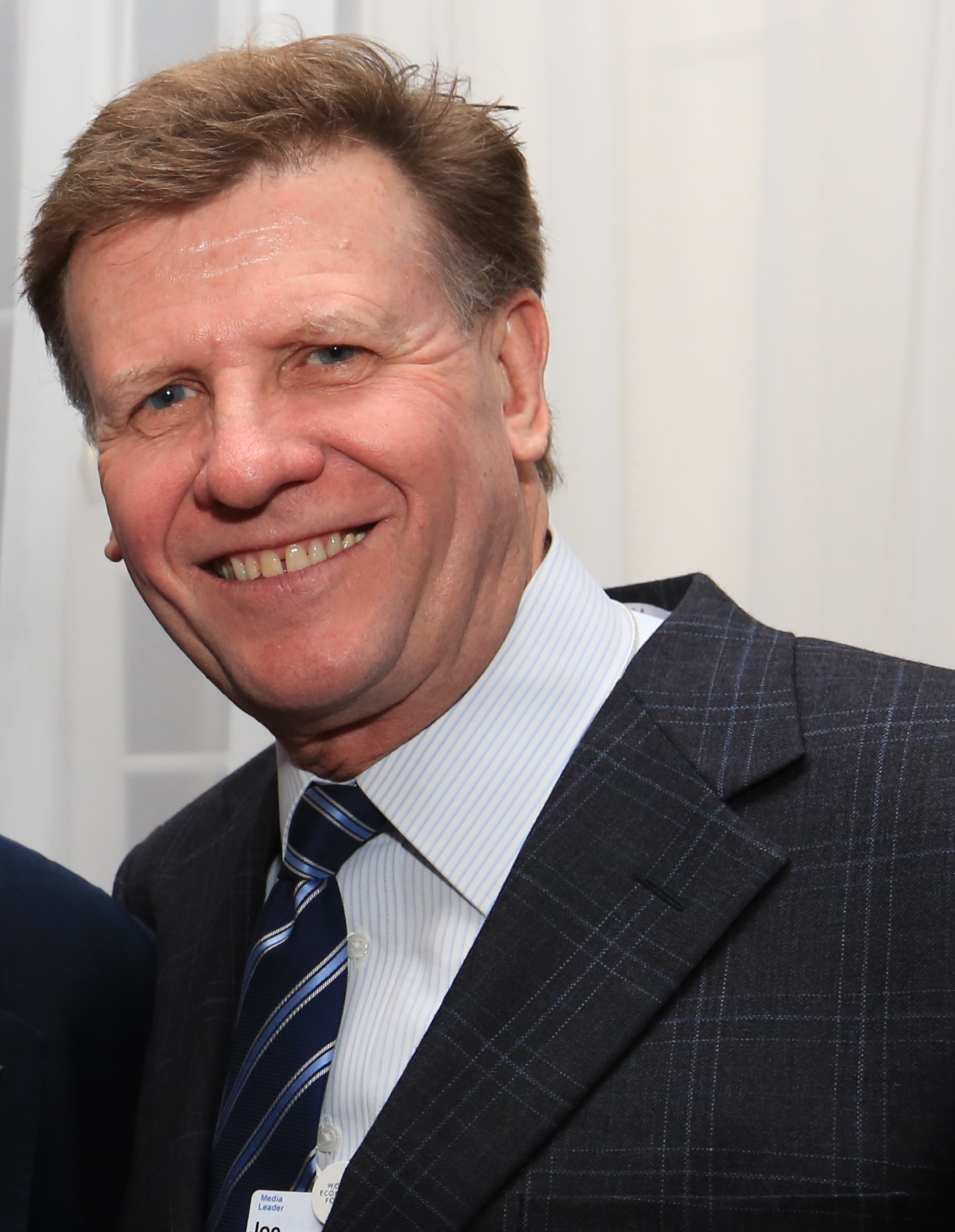
Joe Kernen

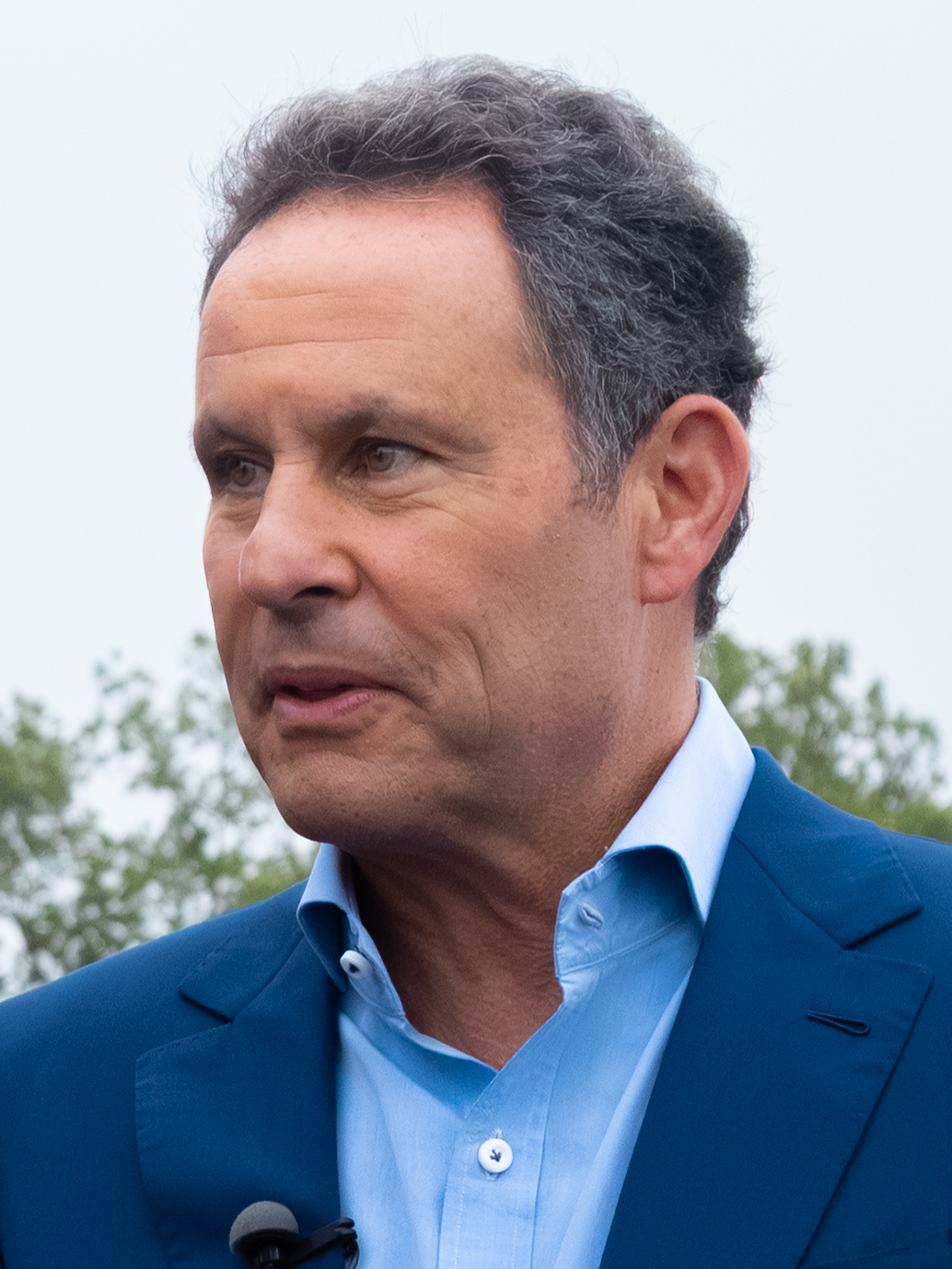
Brian Kilmeade

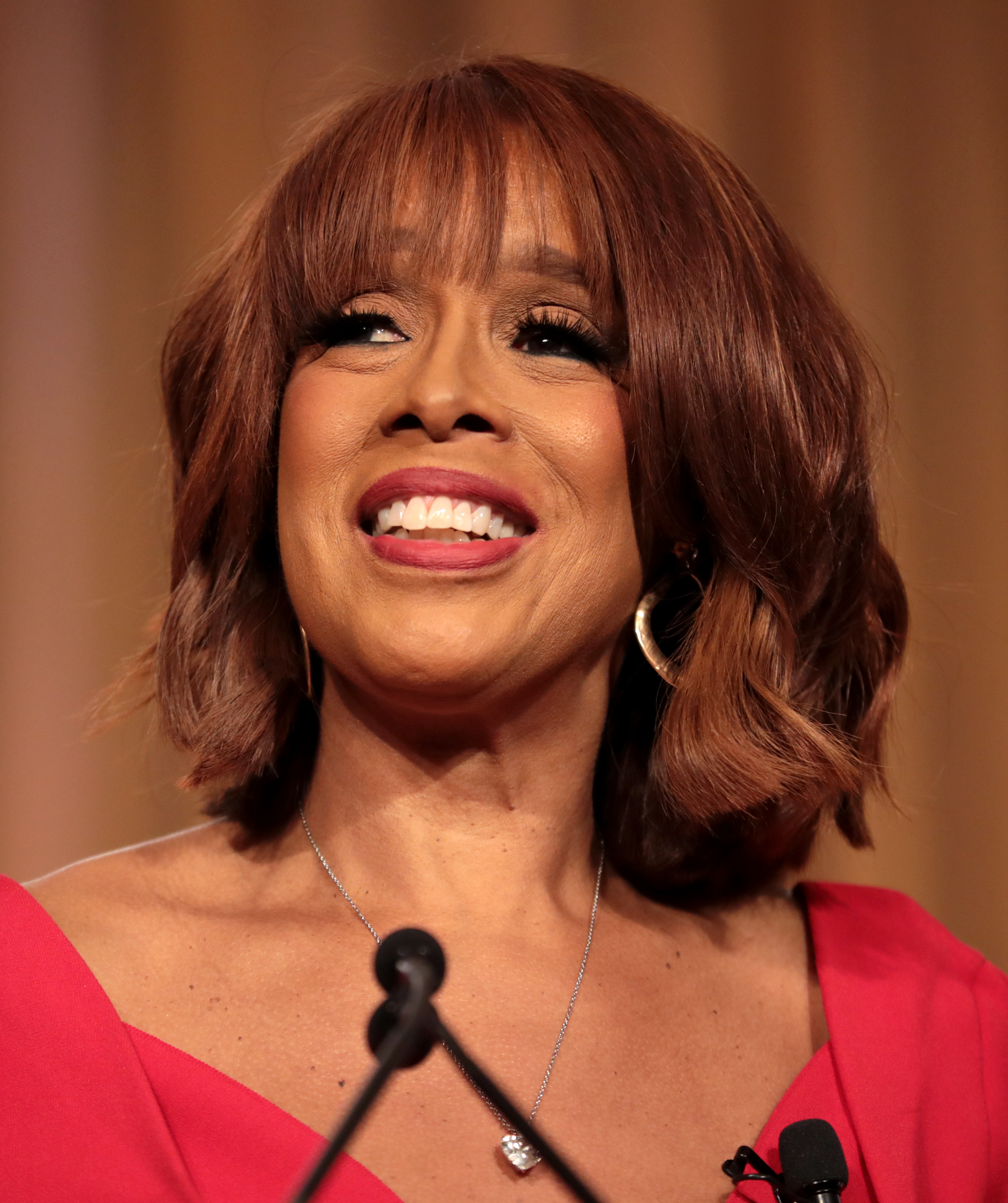
Gayle King

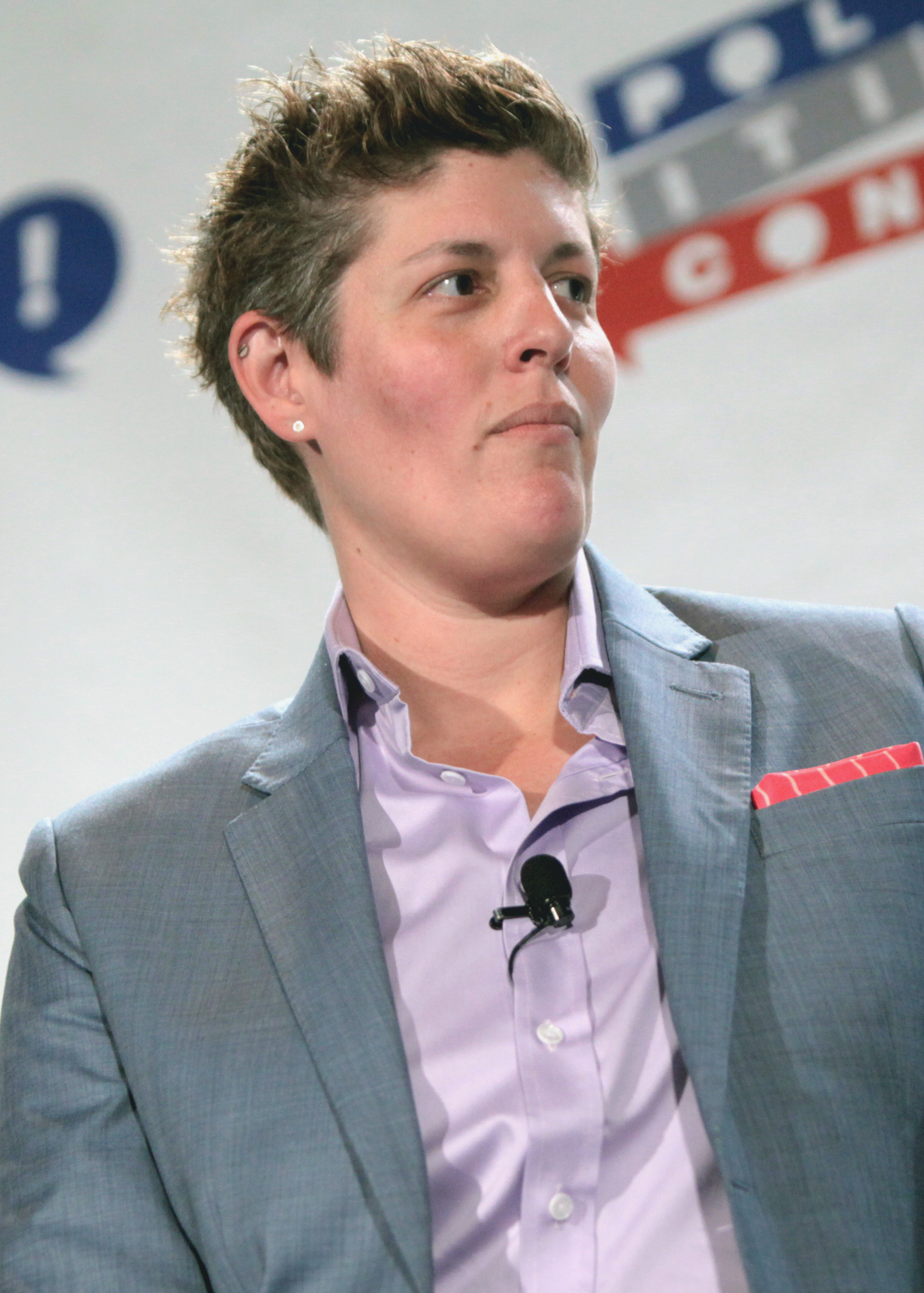
Sally Kohn

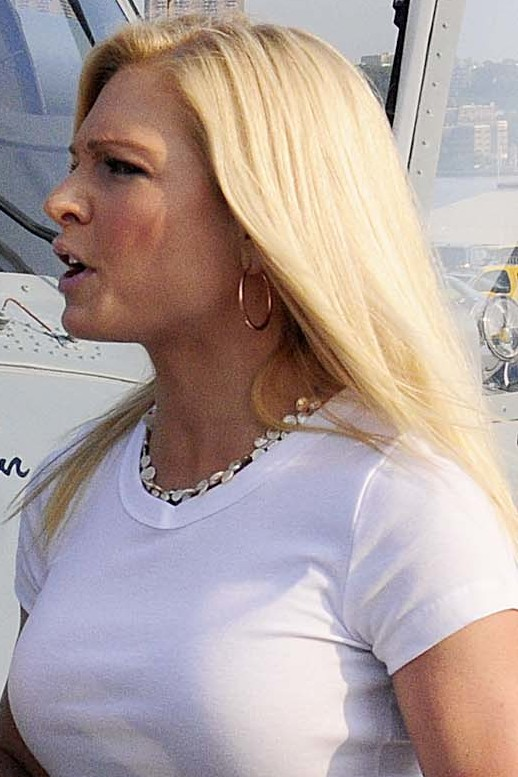
Anna Kooiman

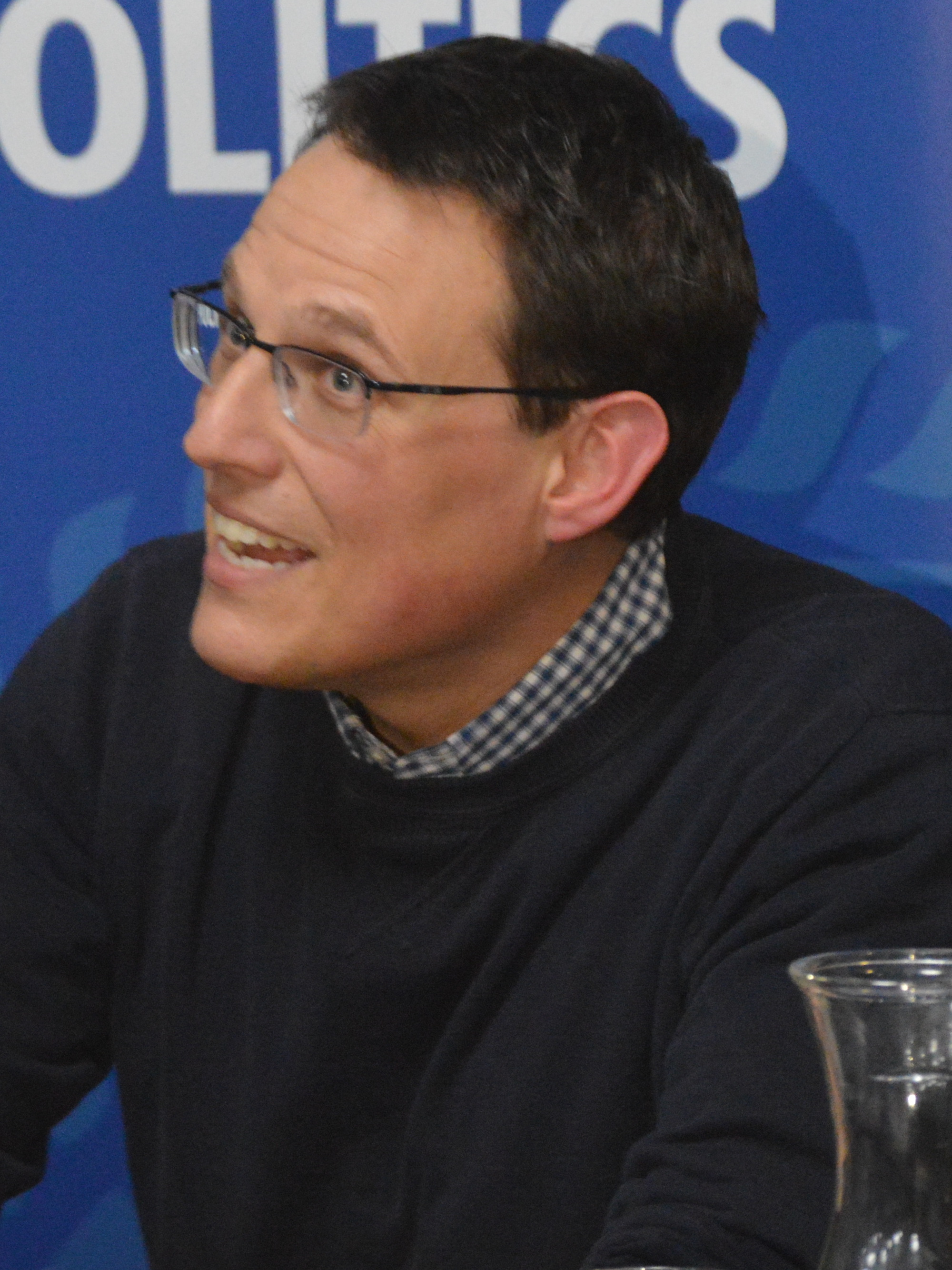
Steve Kornacki

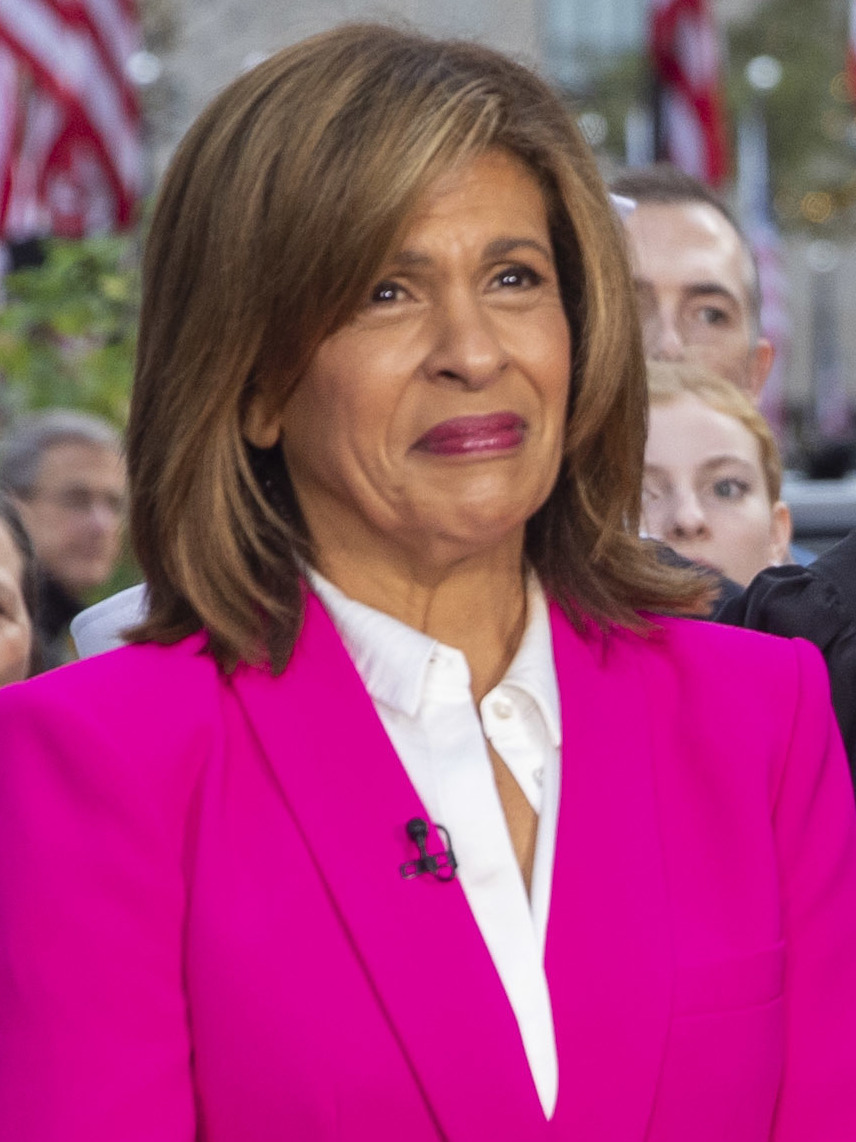
Hoda Kotb

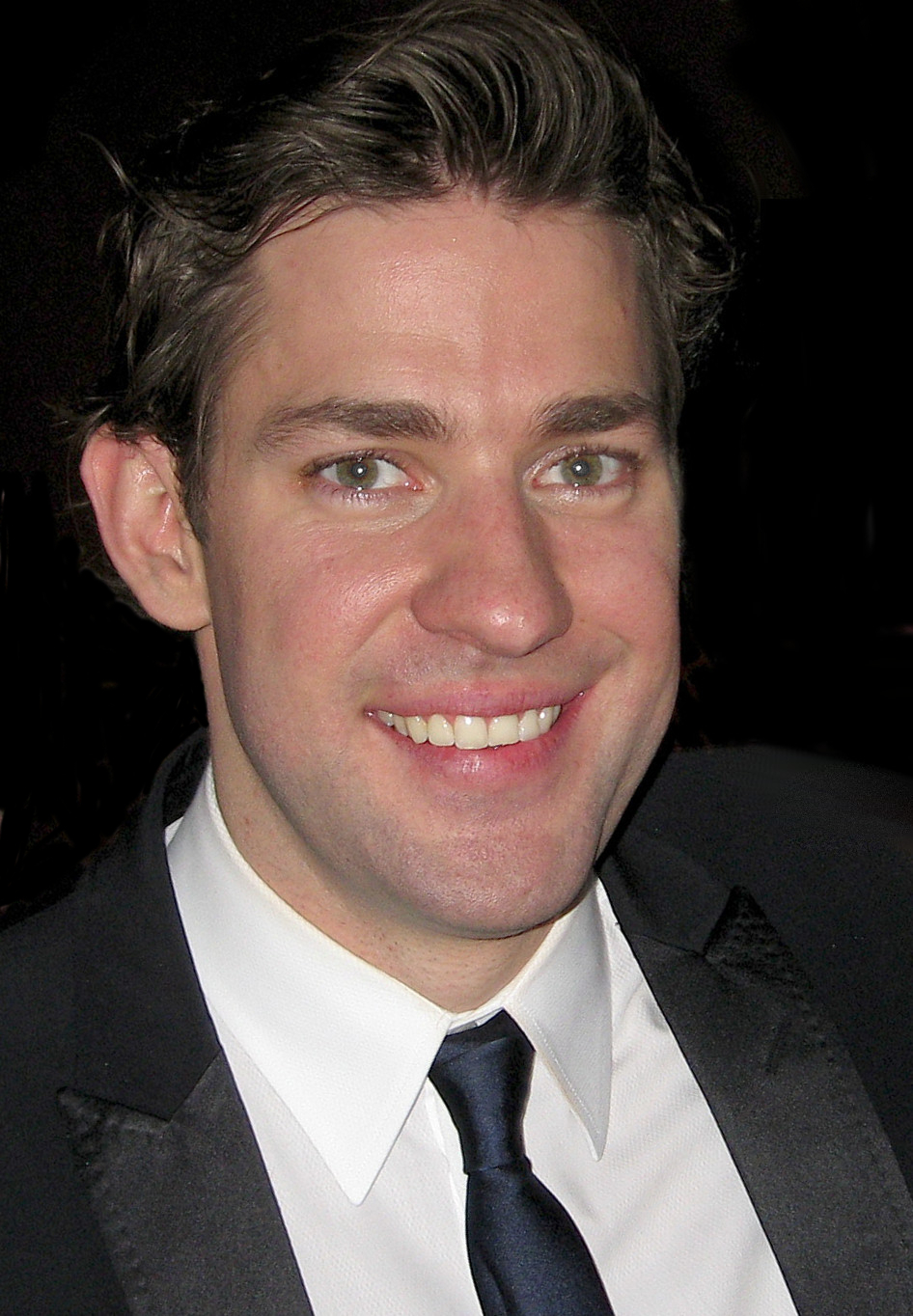
John Krasinski

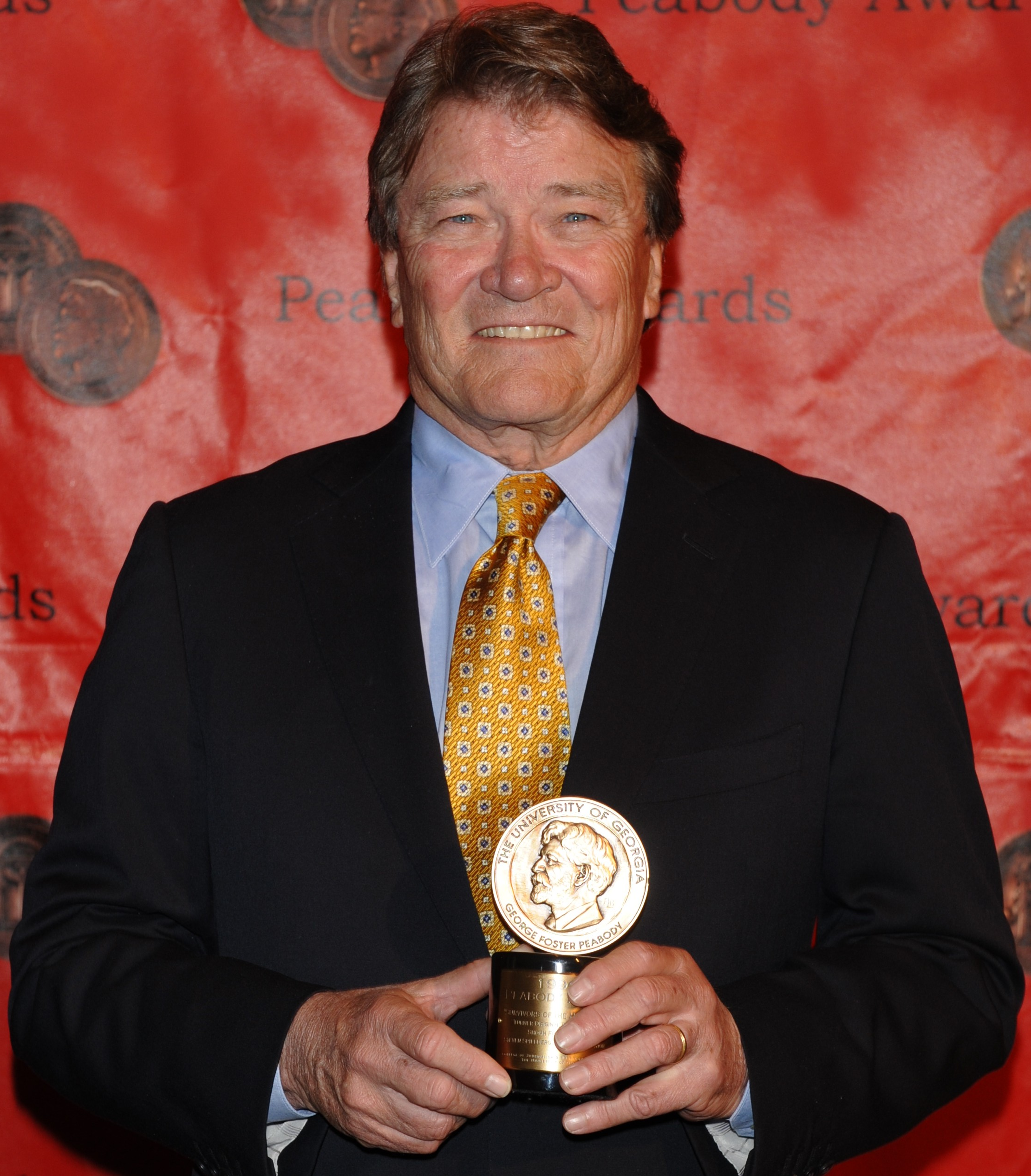
Steve Kroft

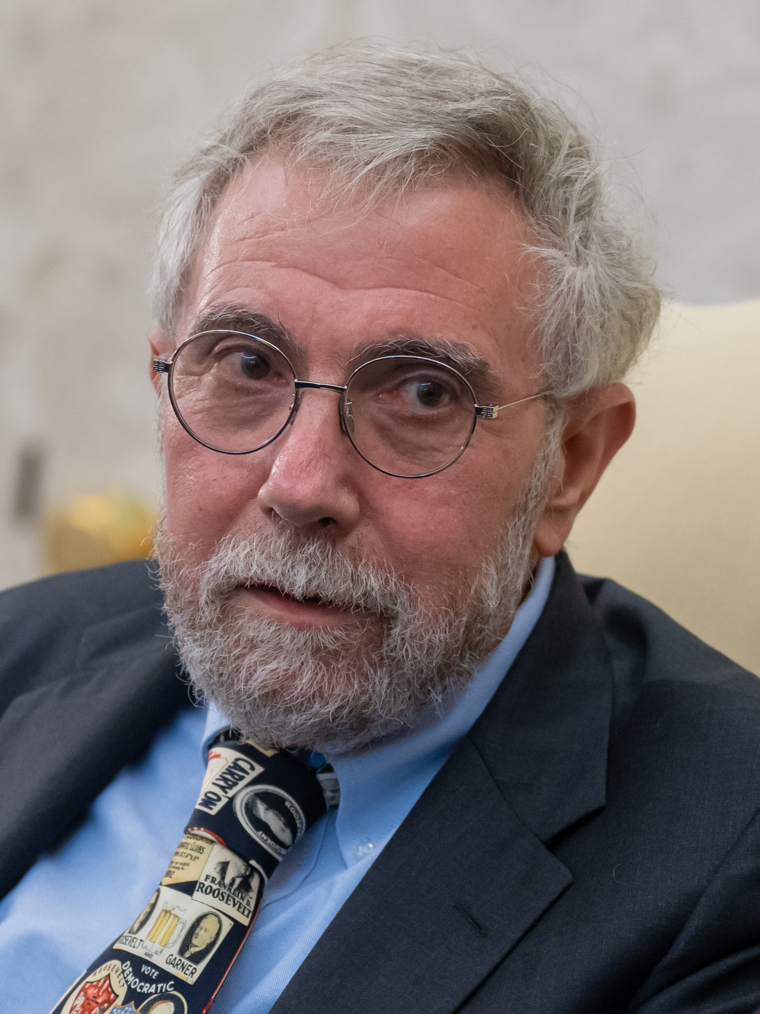
Paul Krugman

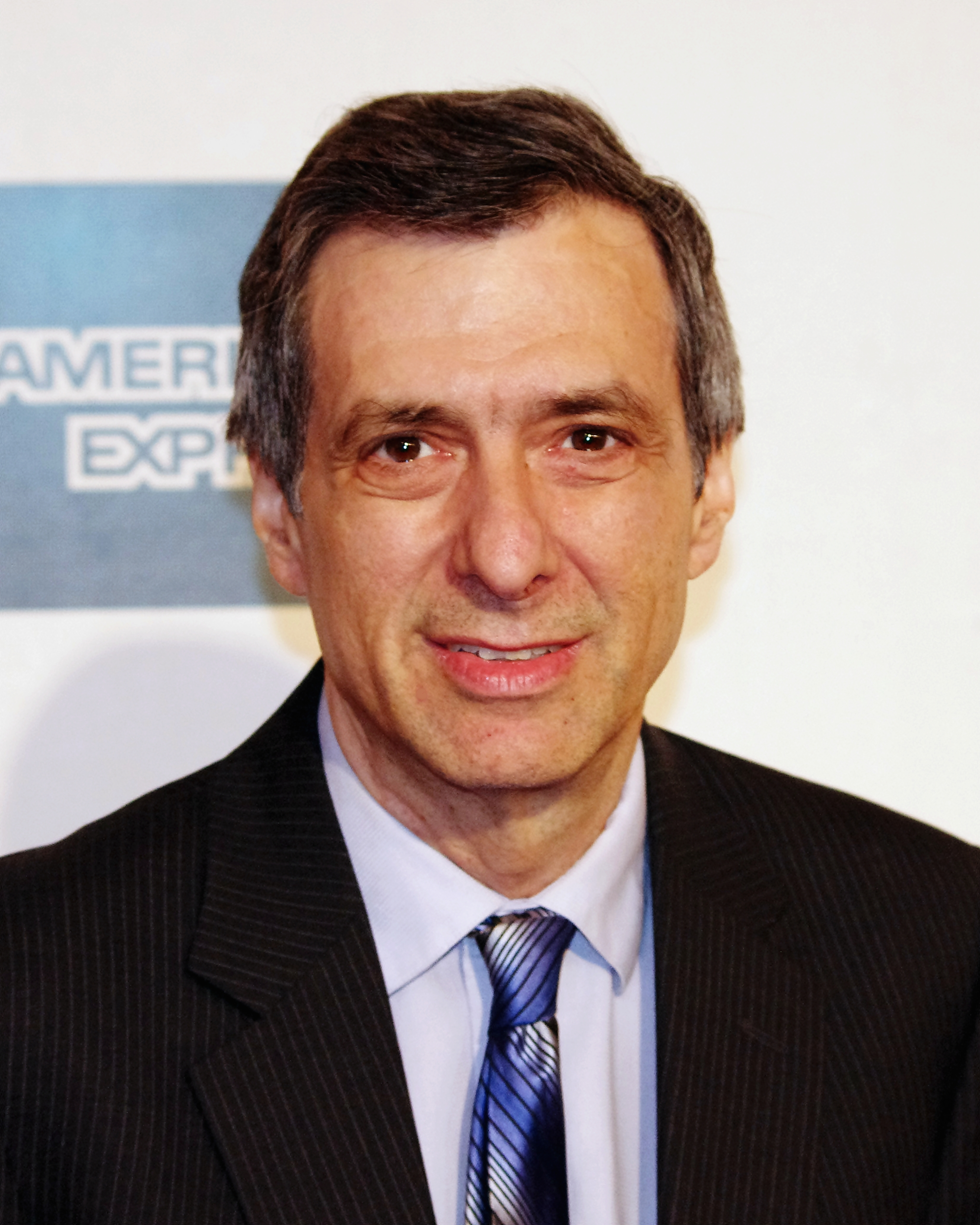
Howard Kurtz

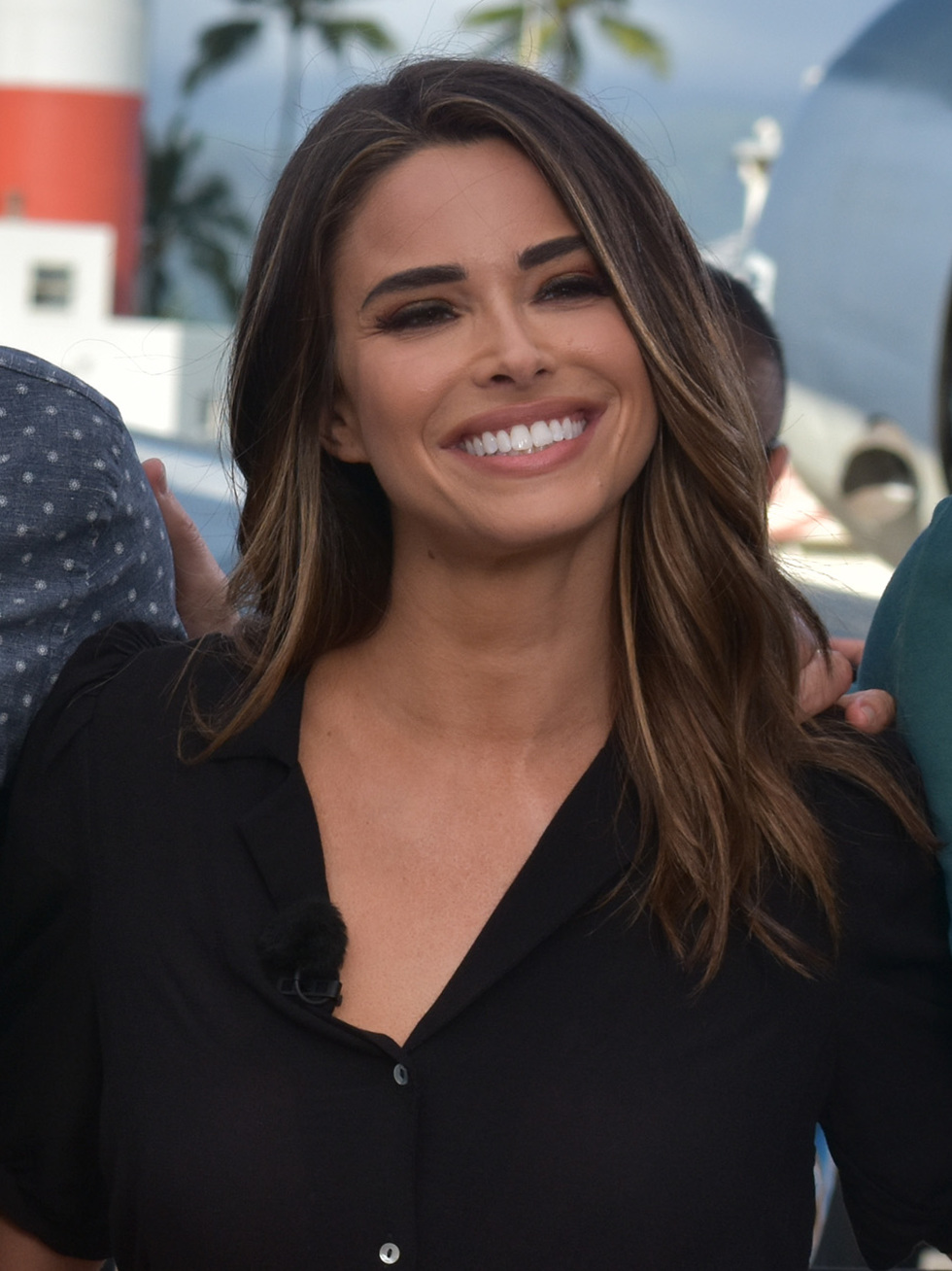
Jennifer Lahmers

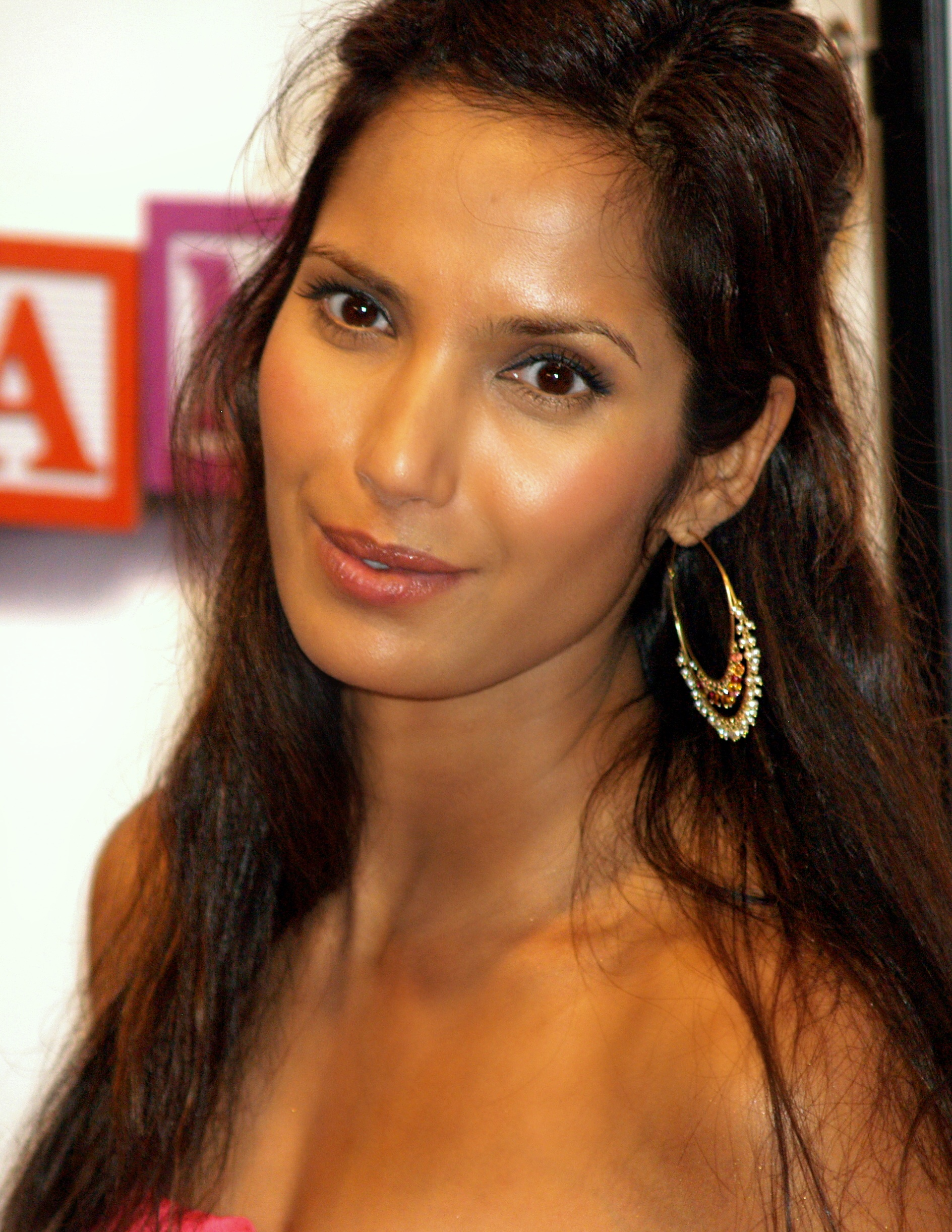
Padma Lakshmi

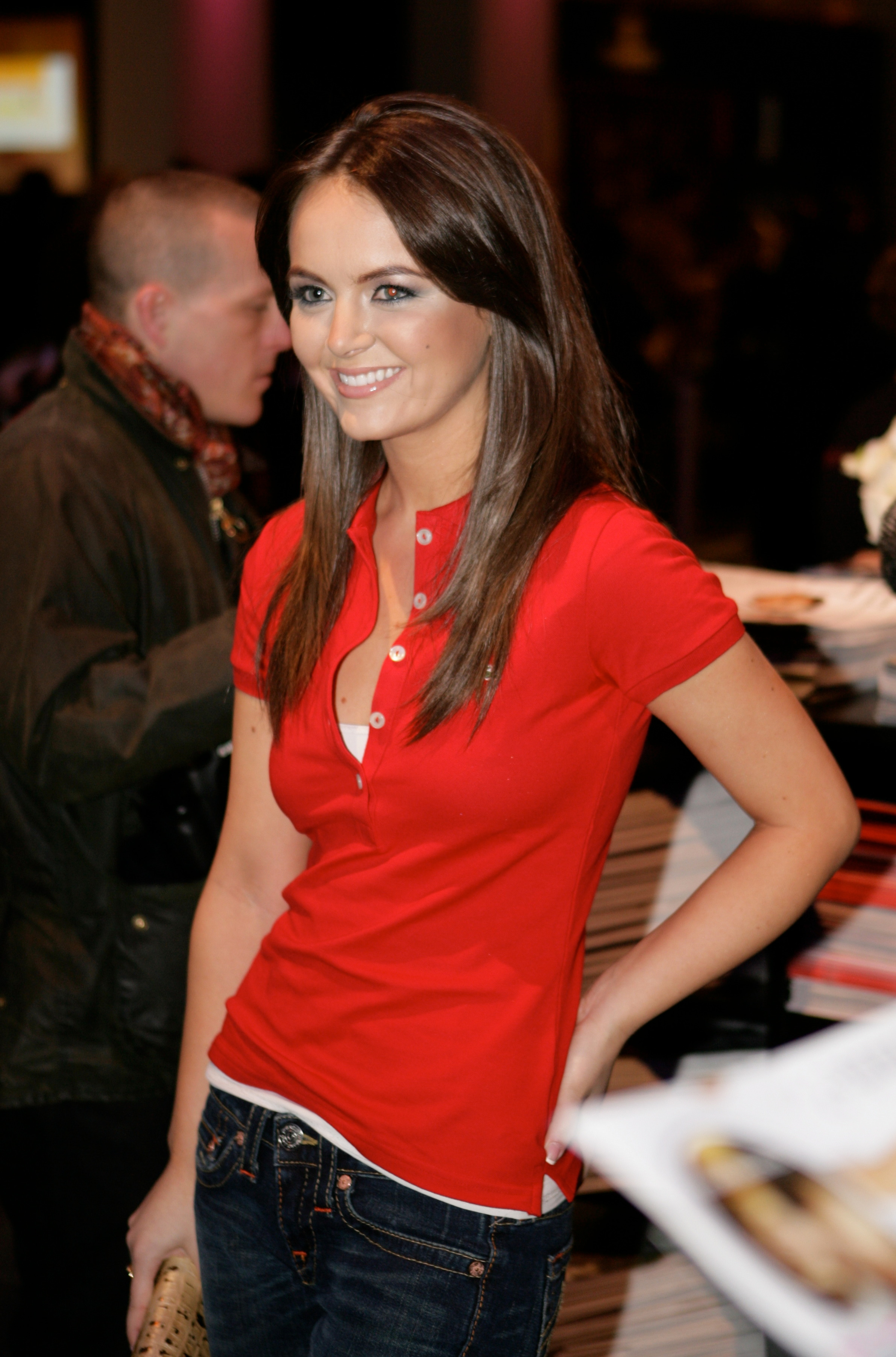
Nicole Lapin

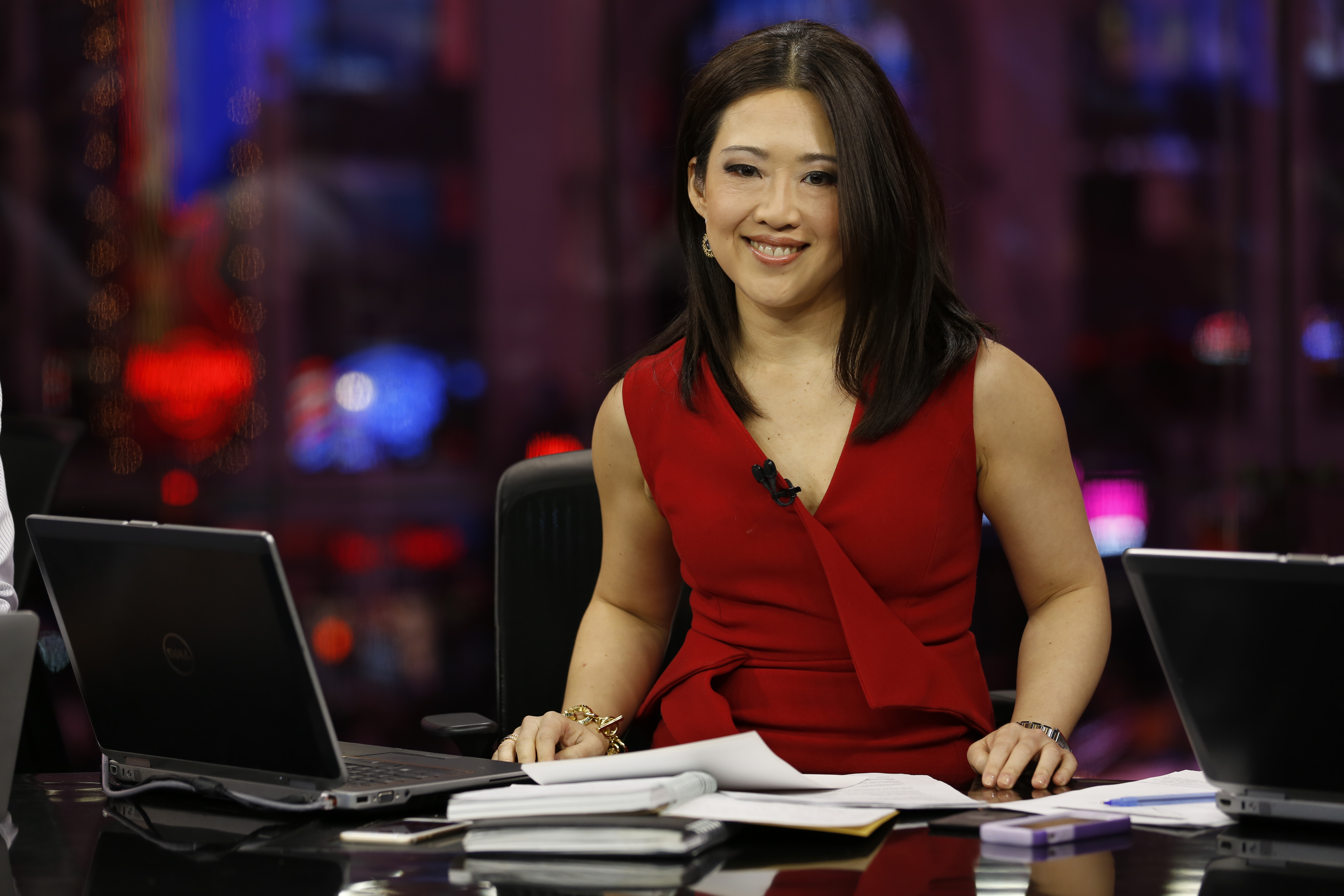
Melissa Lee

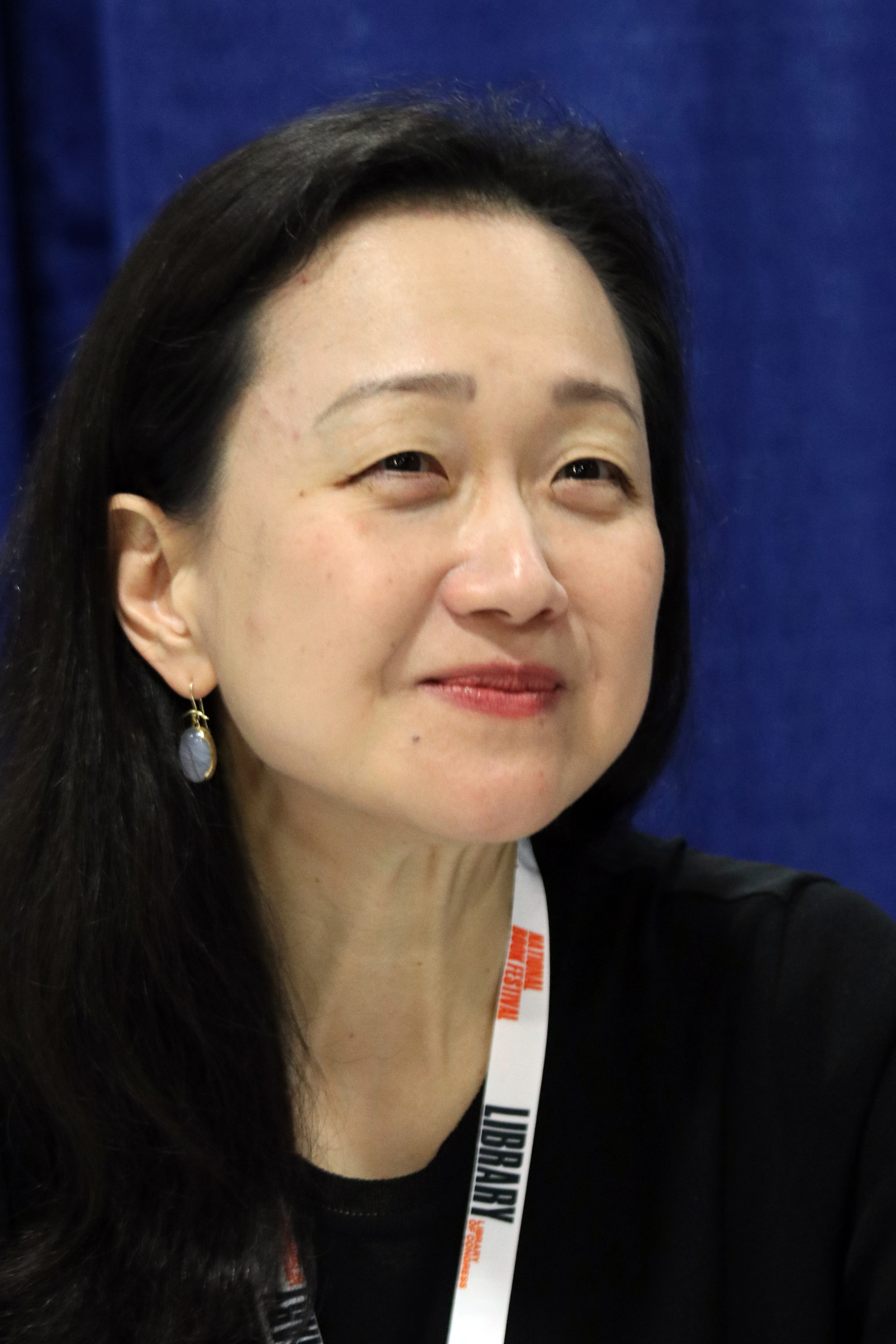
Min Jin Lee

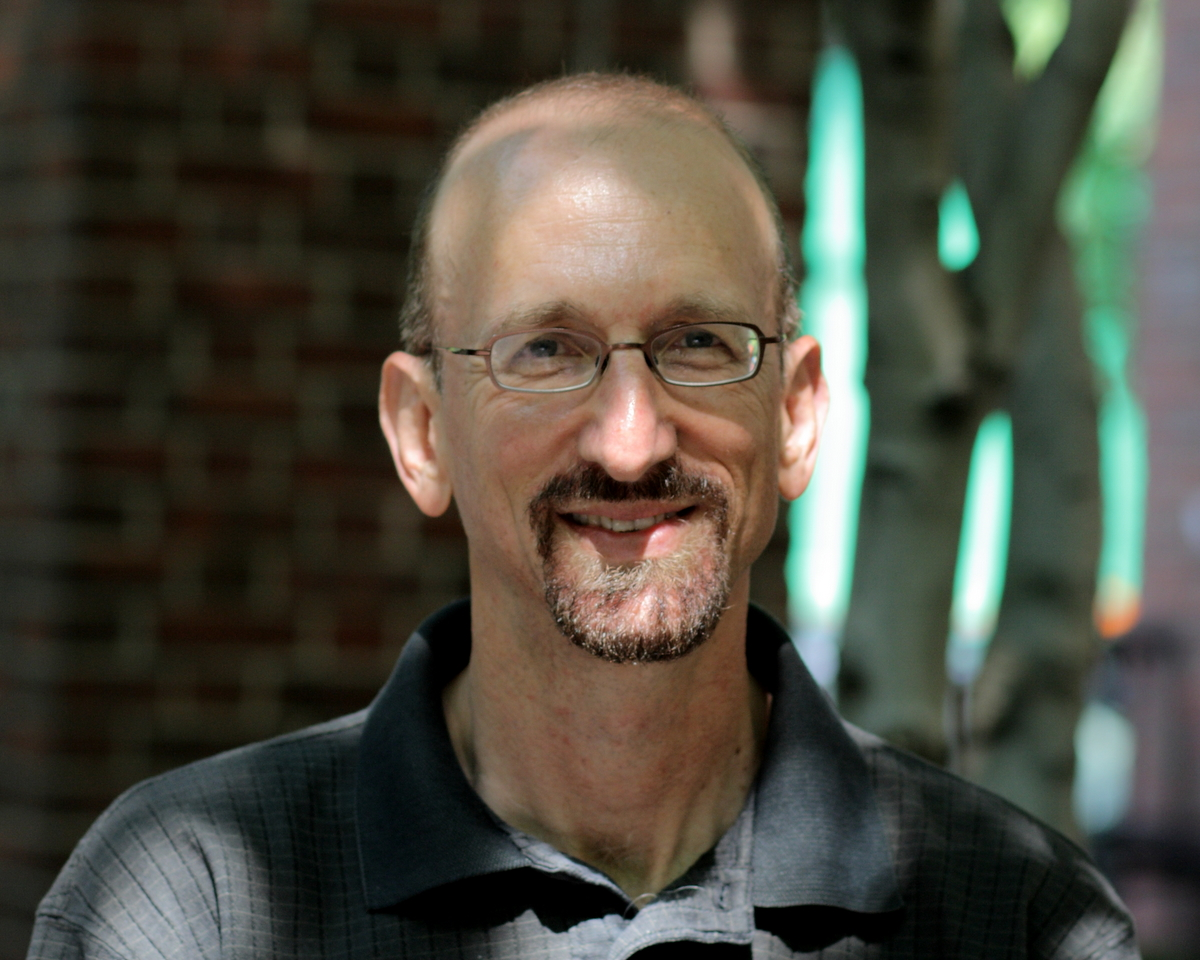
Brian Lehrer

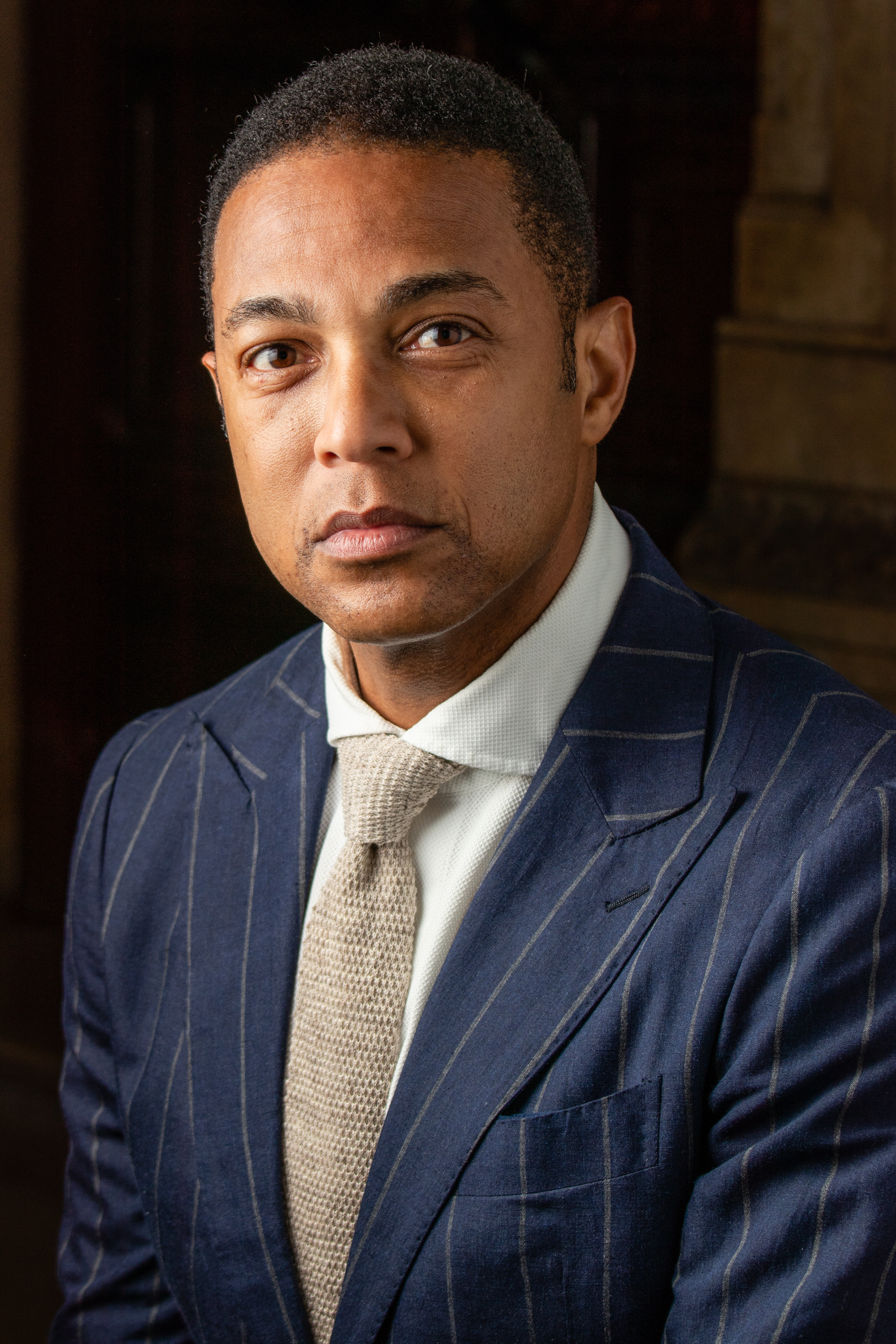
Don Lemon

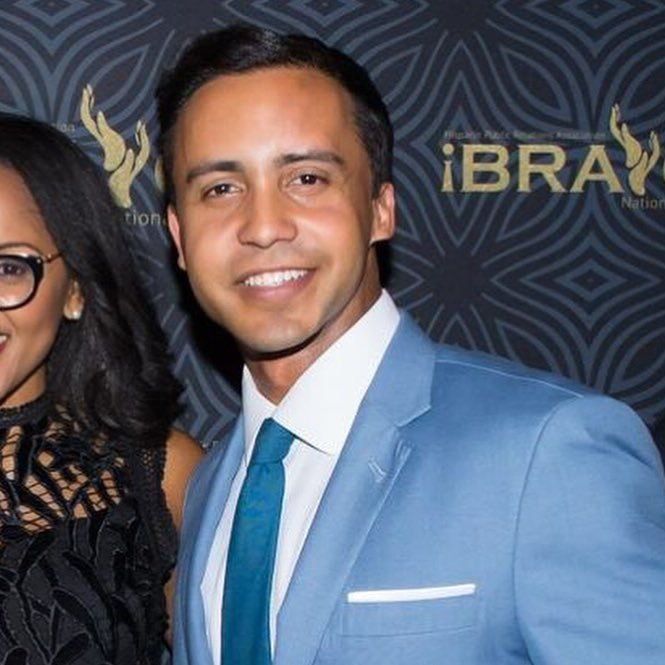
Bryan Llenas

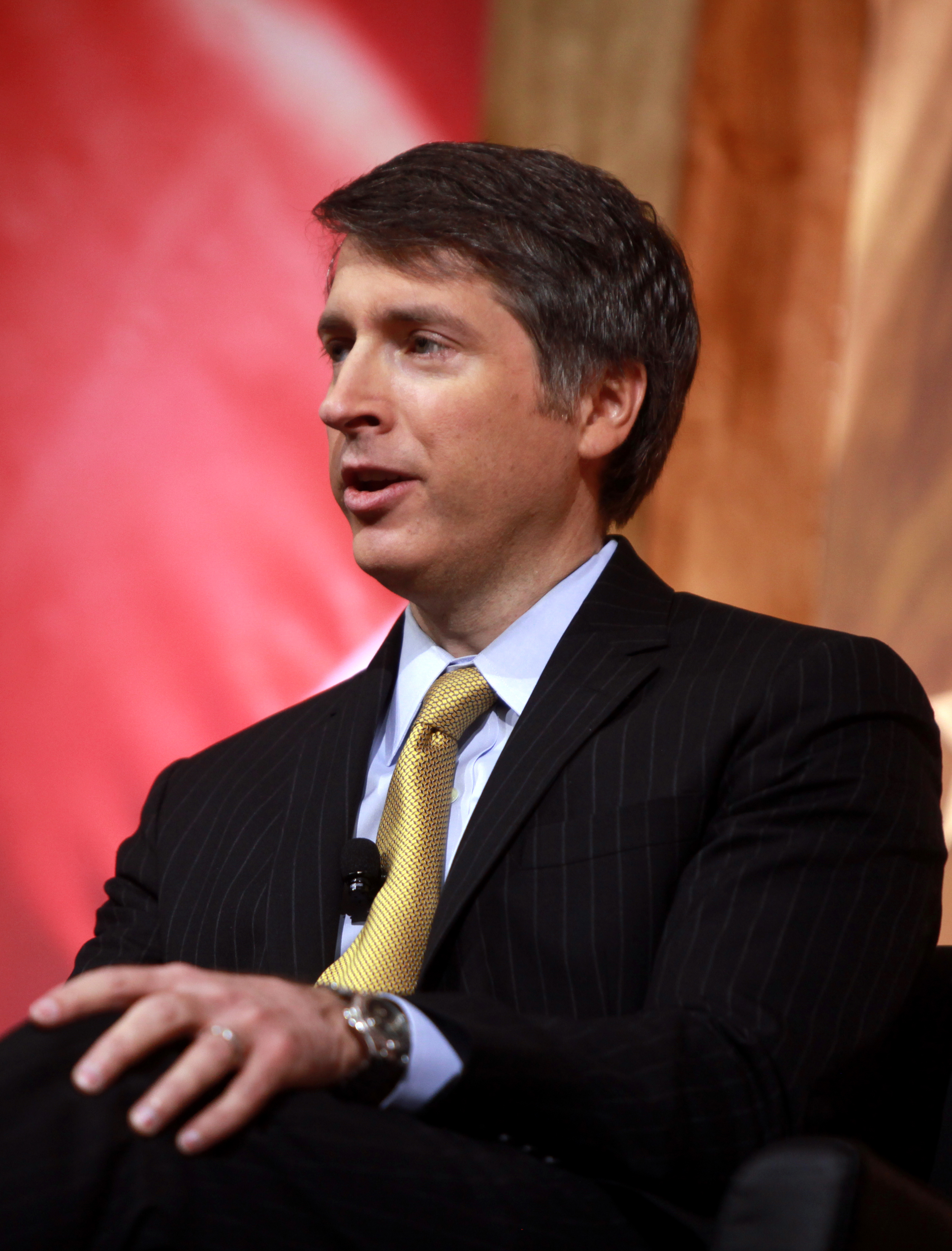
Rich Lowry

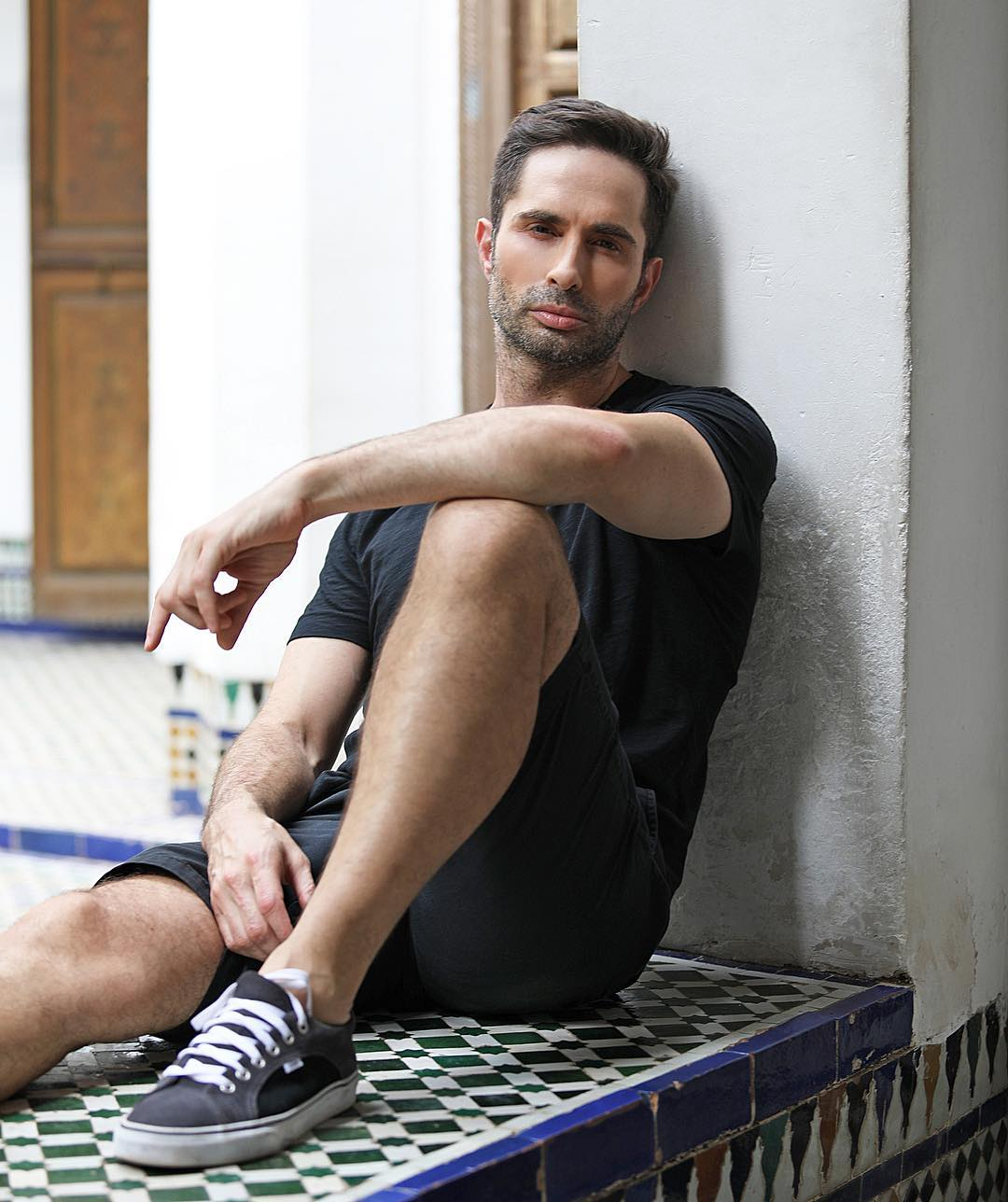
Michael Lucas

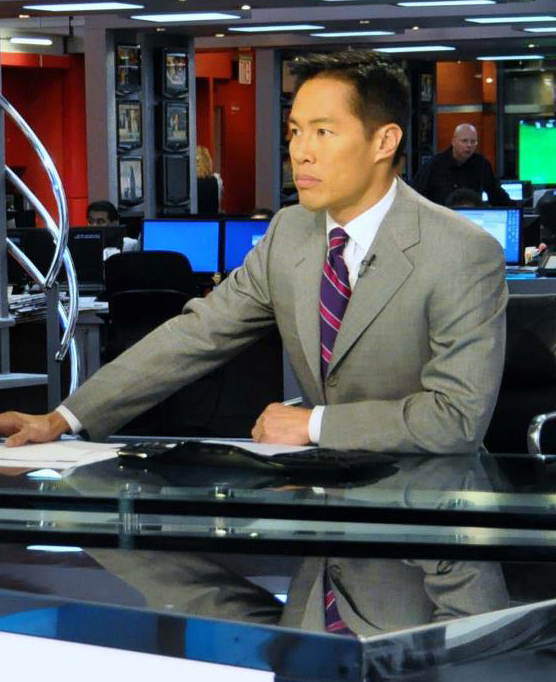
Richard Lui

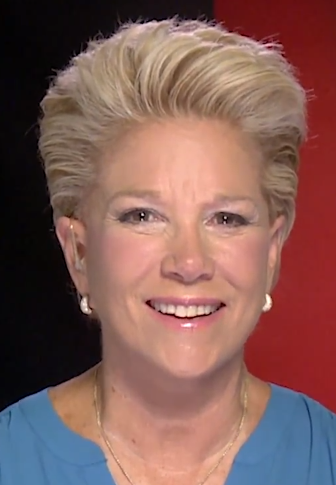
Joan Lunden

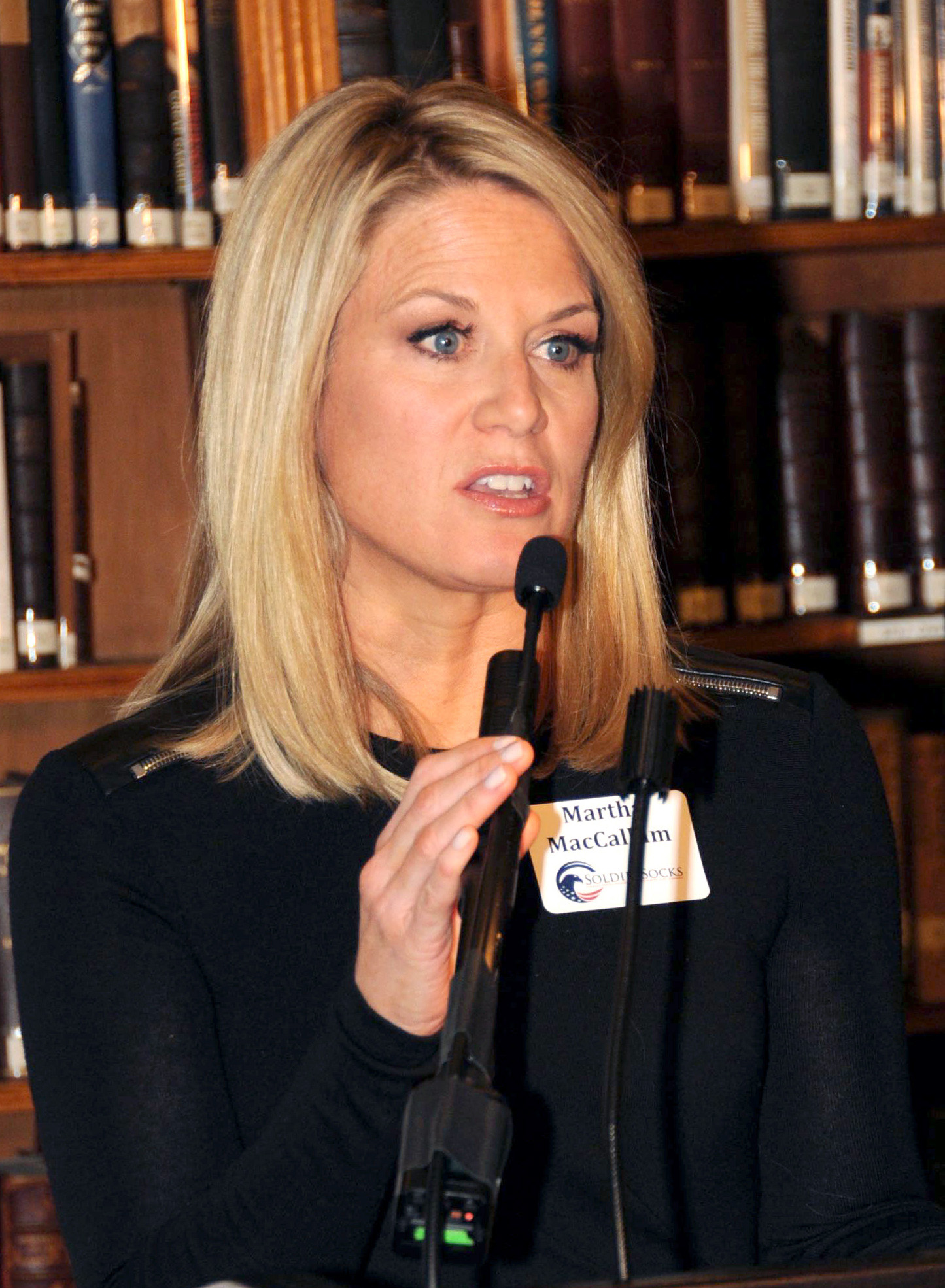
Martha MacCallum

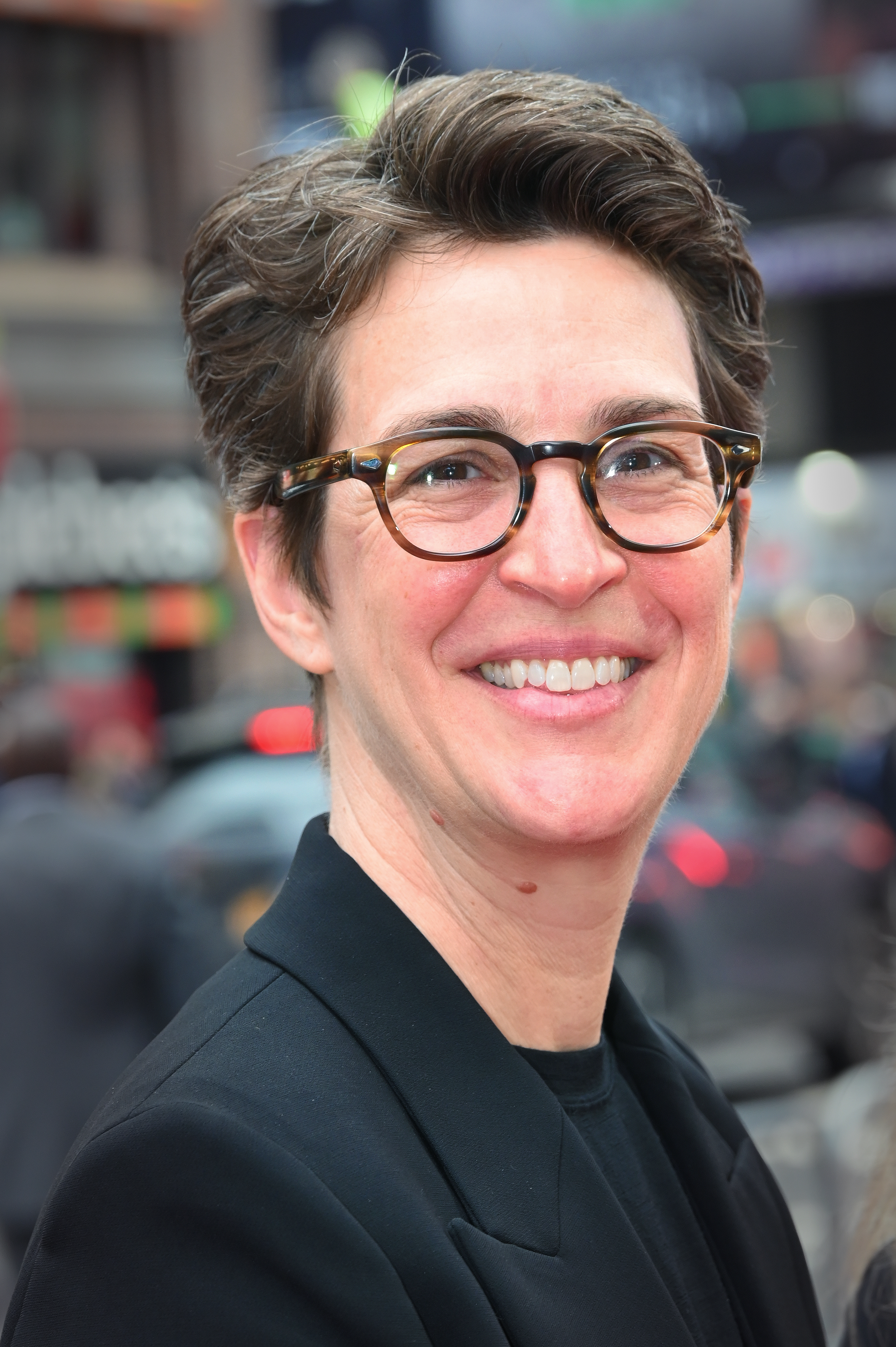
Rachel Maddow

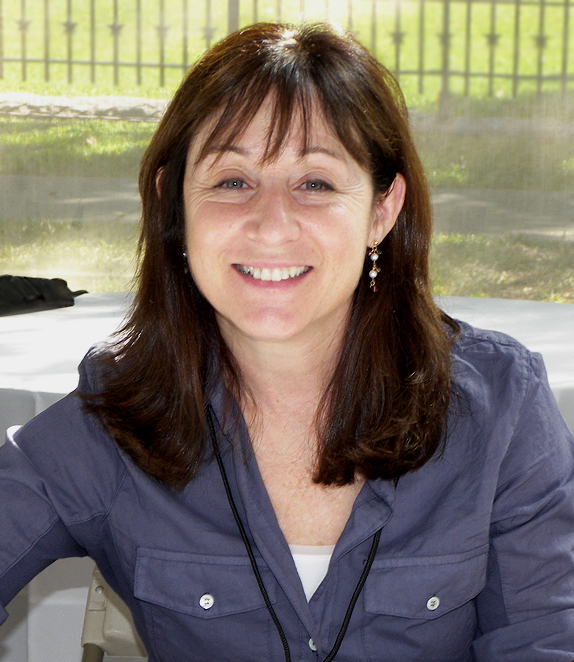
Jane Mayer

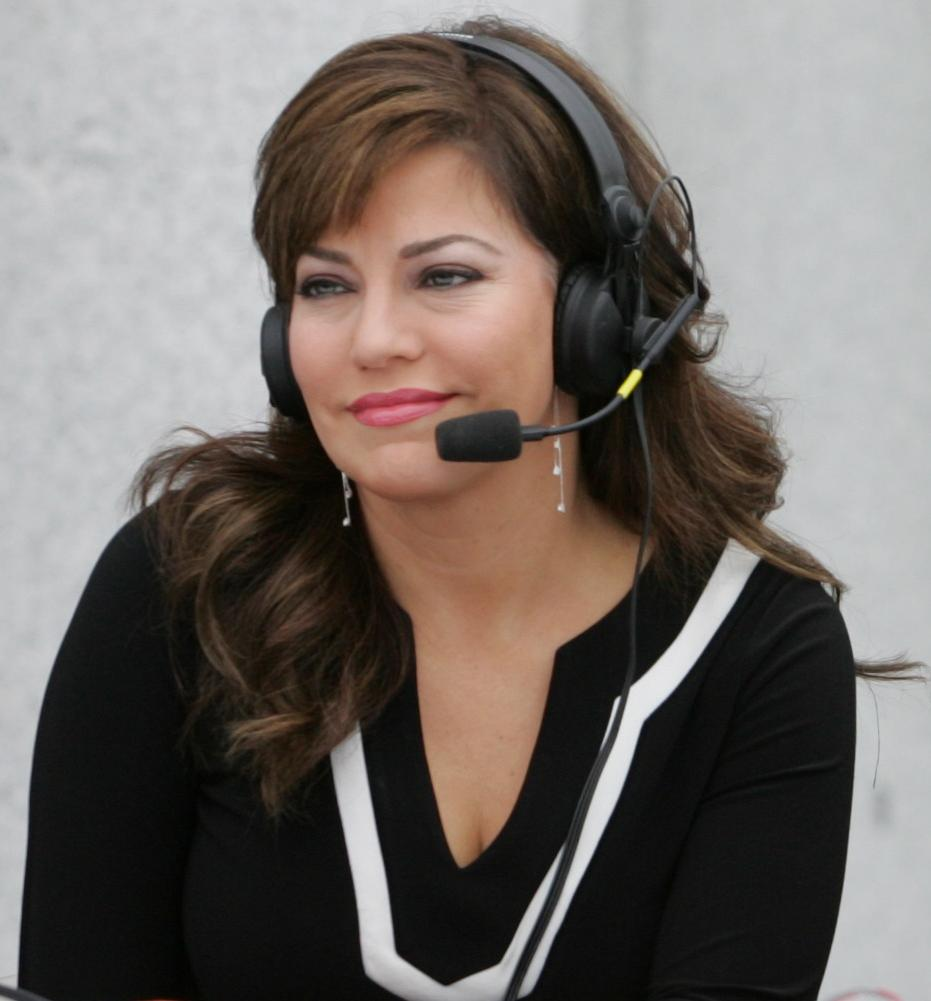
Robin Meade

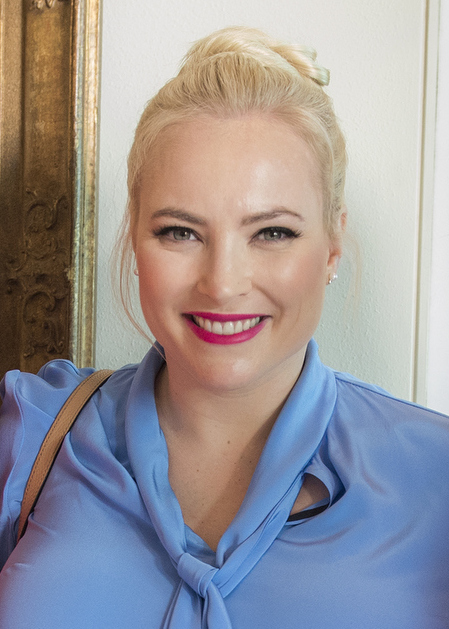
Meghan McCain

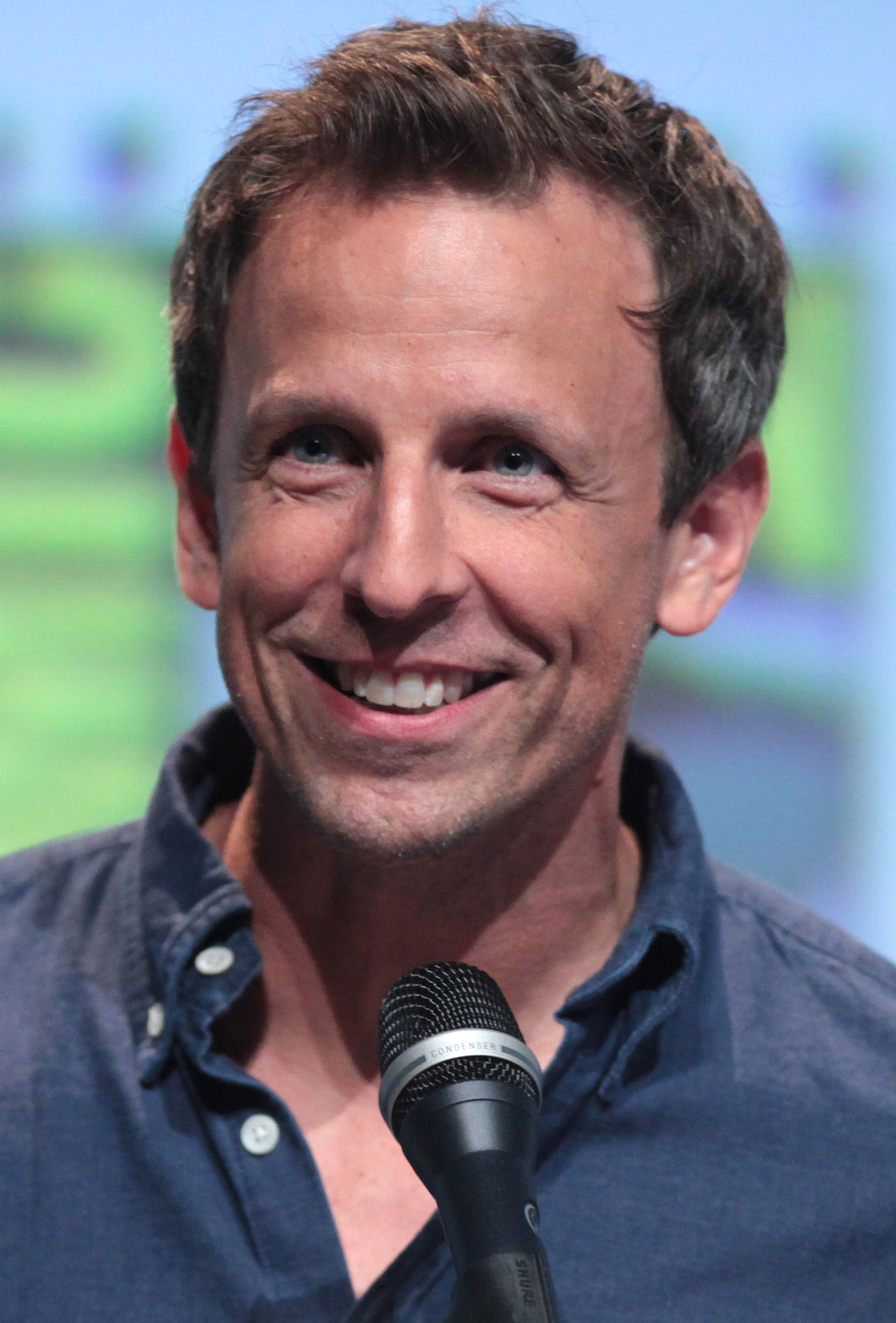
Seth Meyers

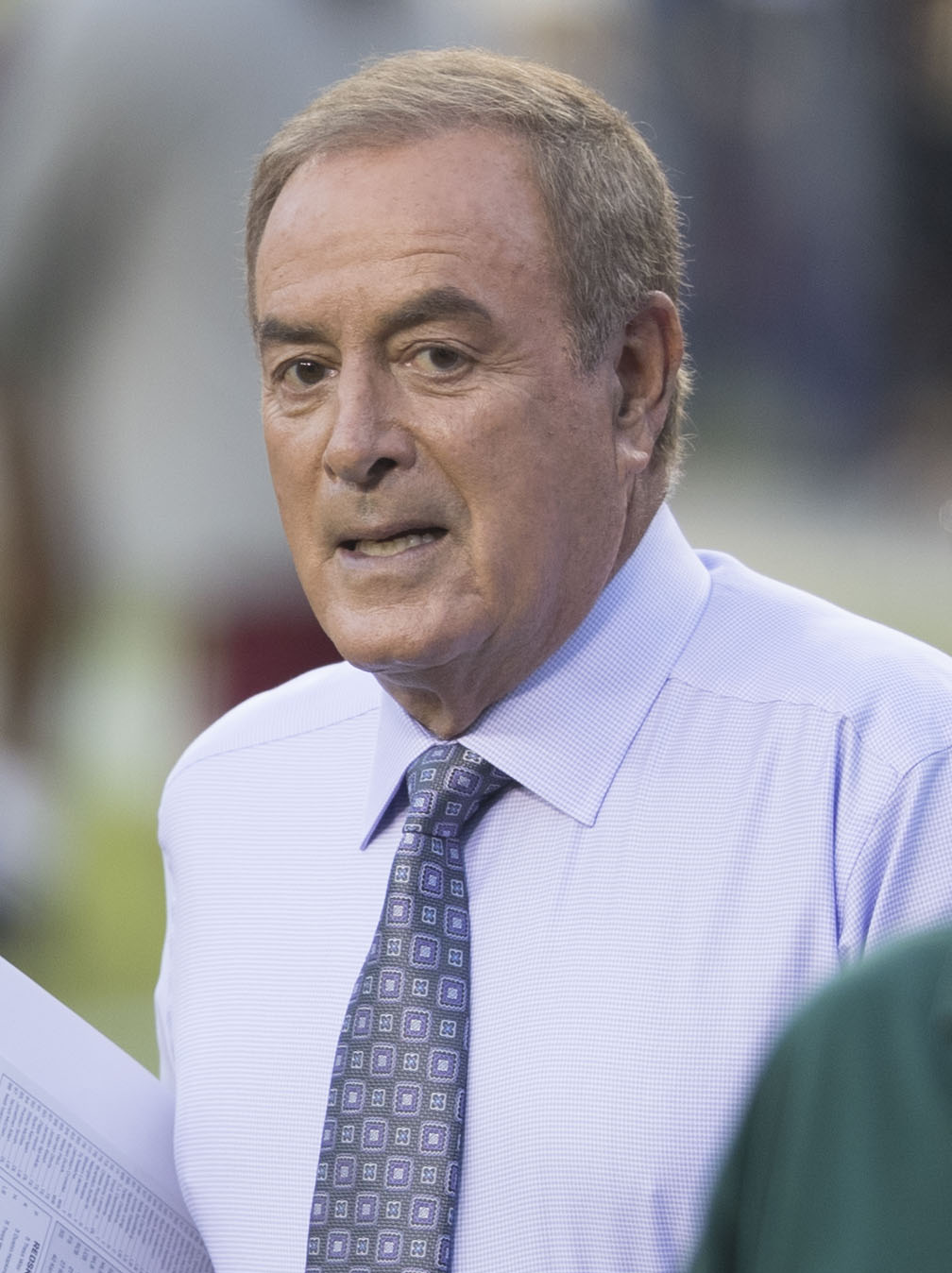
Al Michaels

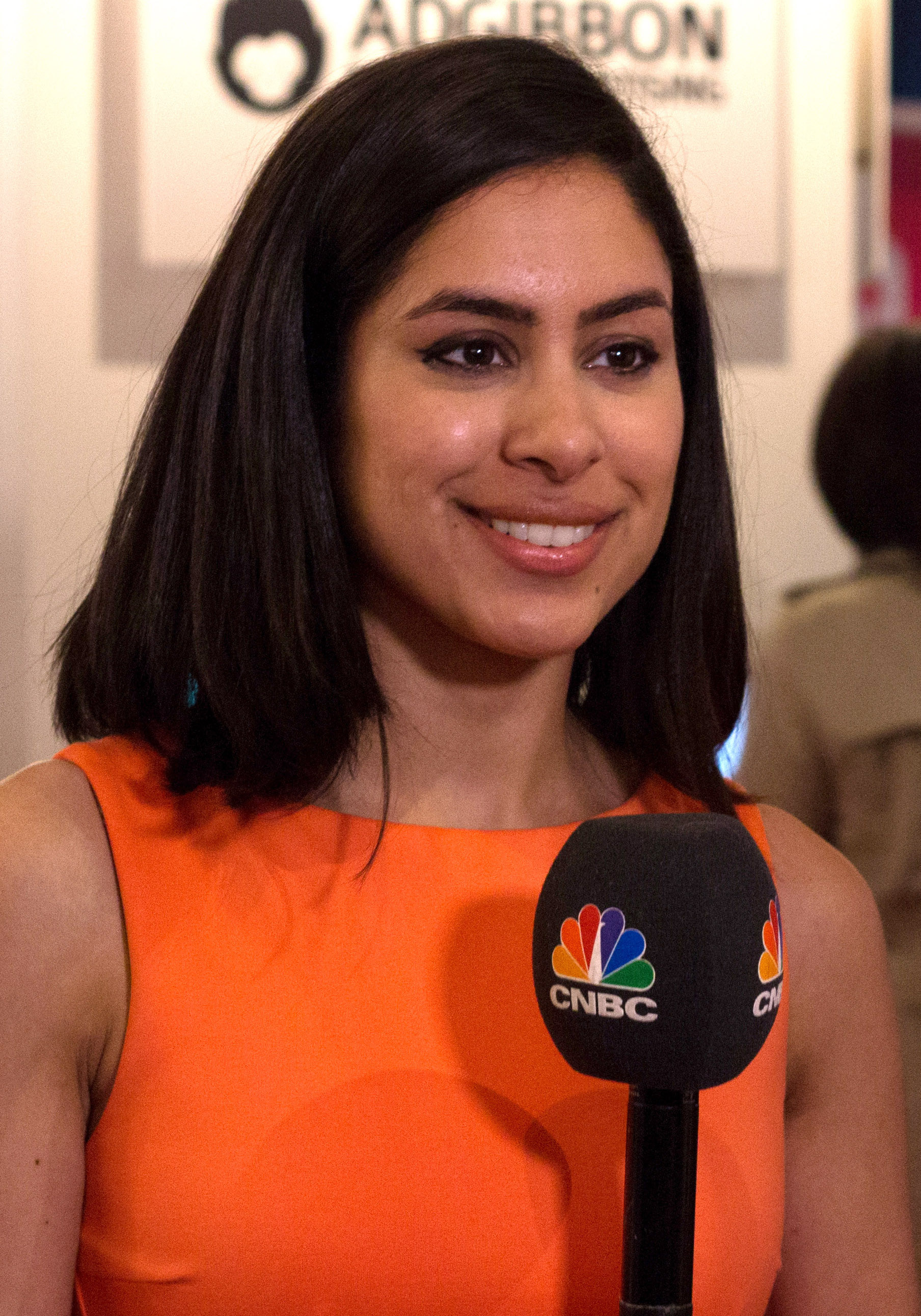
Seema Mody

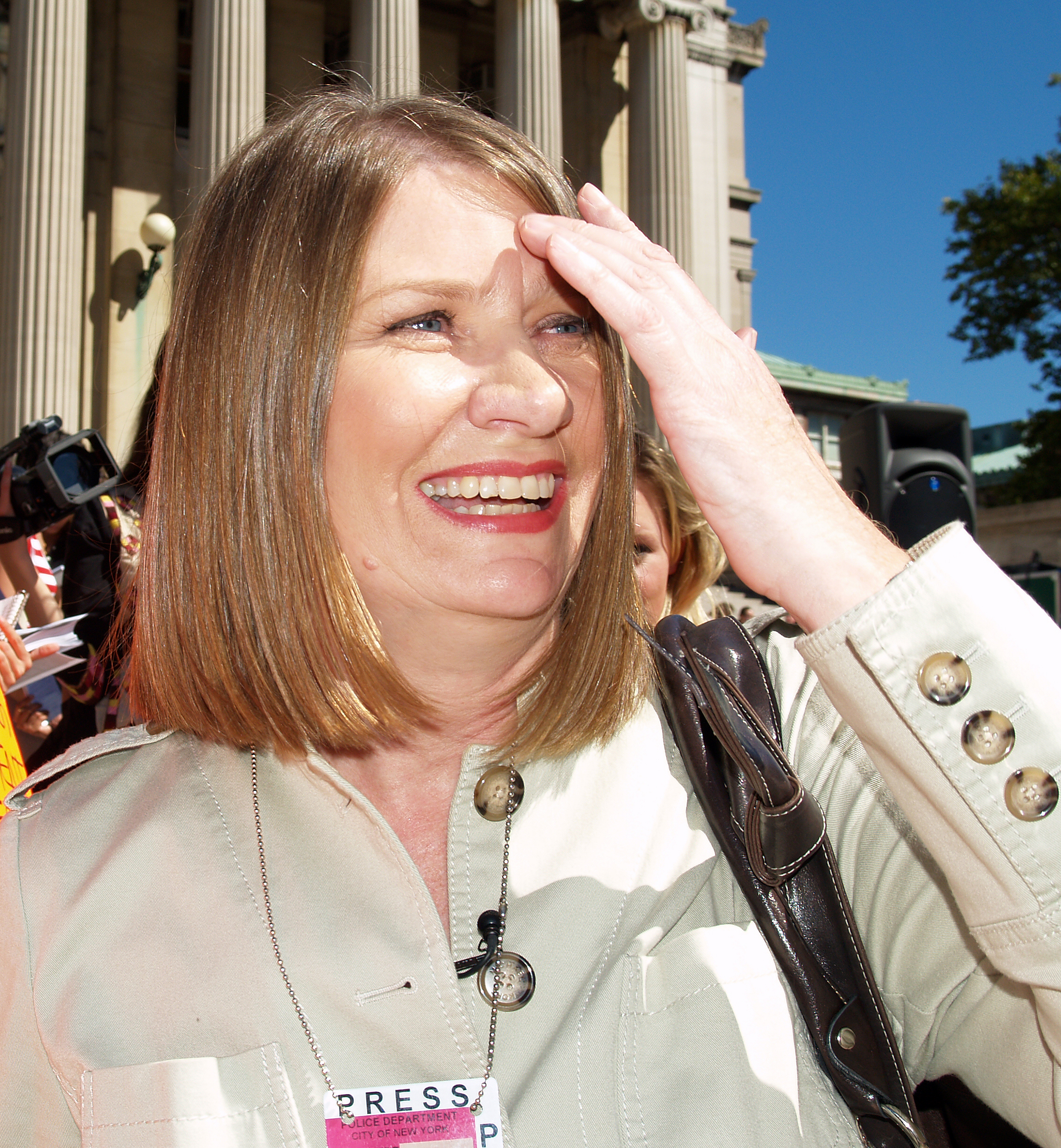
Jeanne Moos

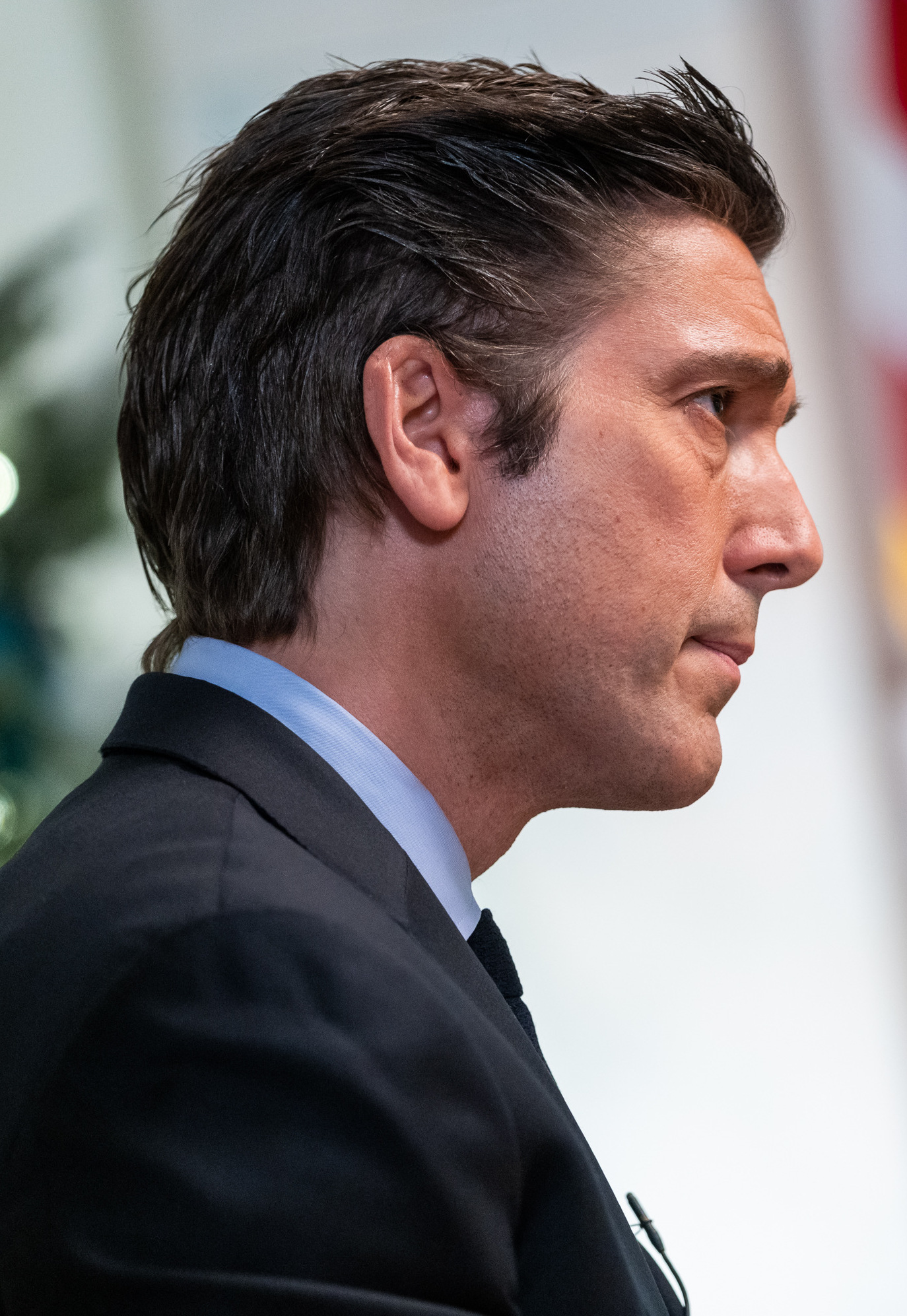
David Muir

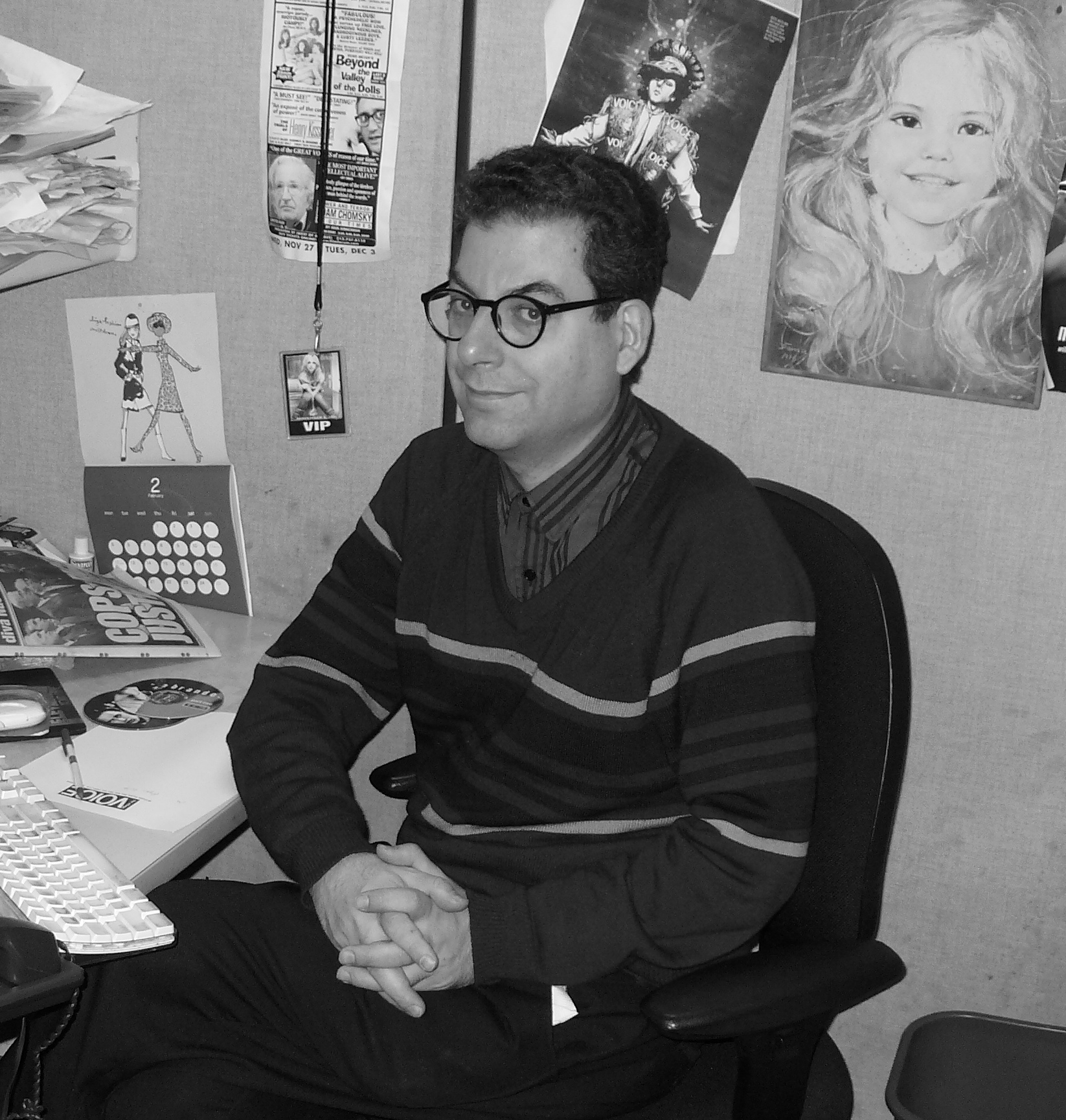
Michael Musto

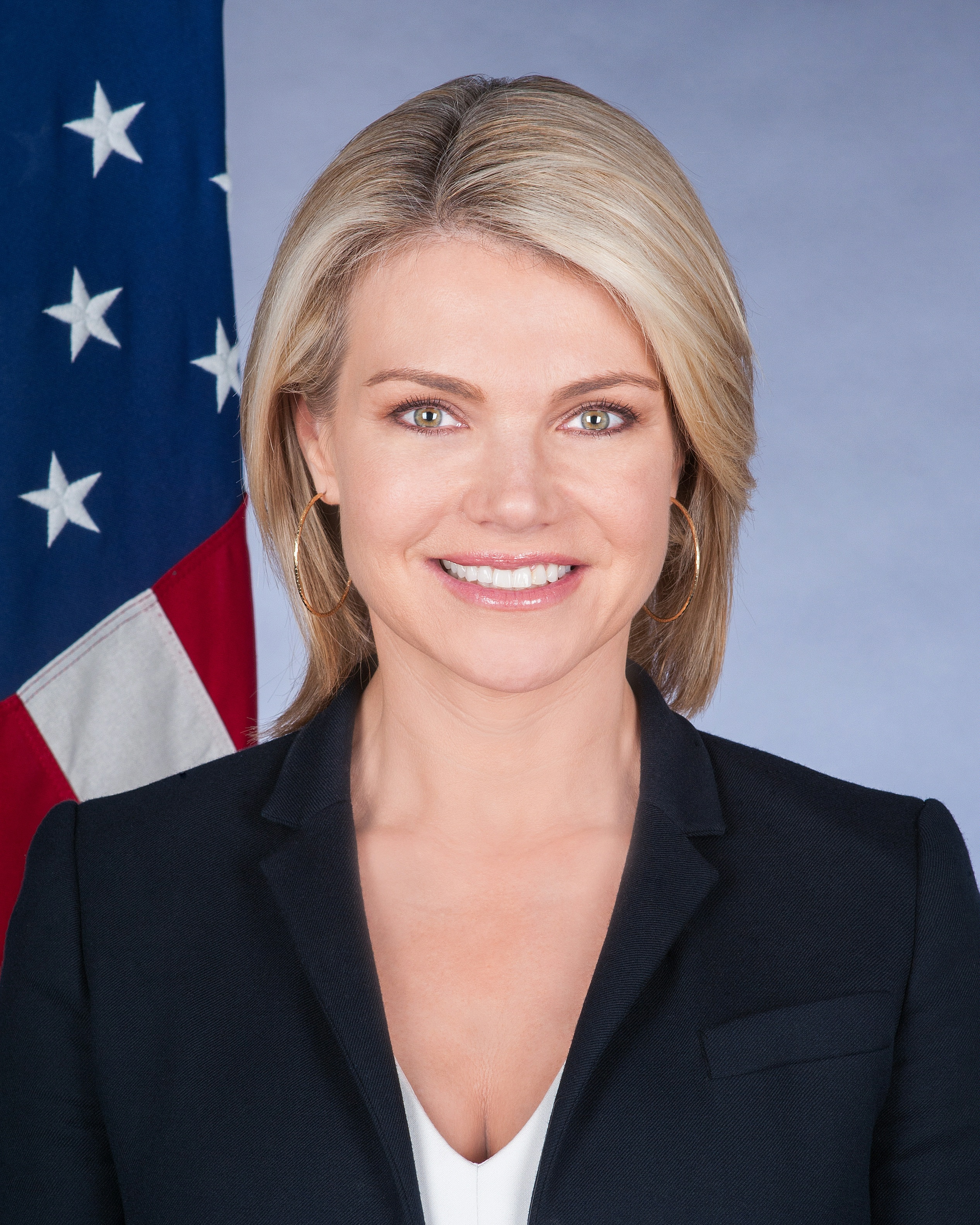
Heather Nauert

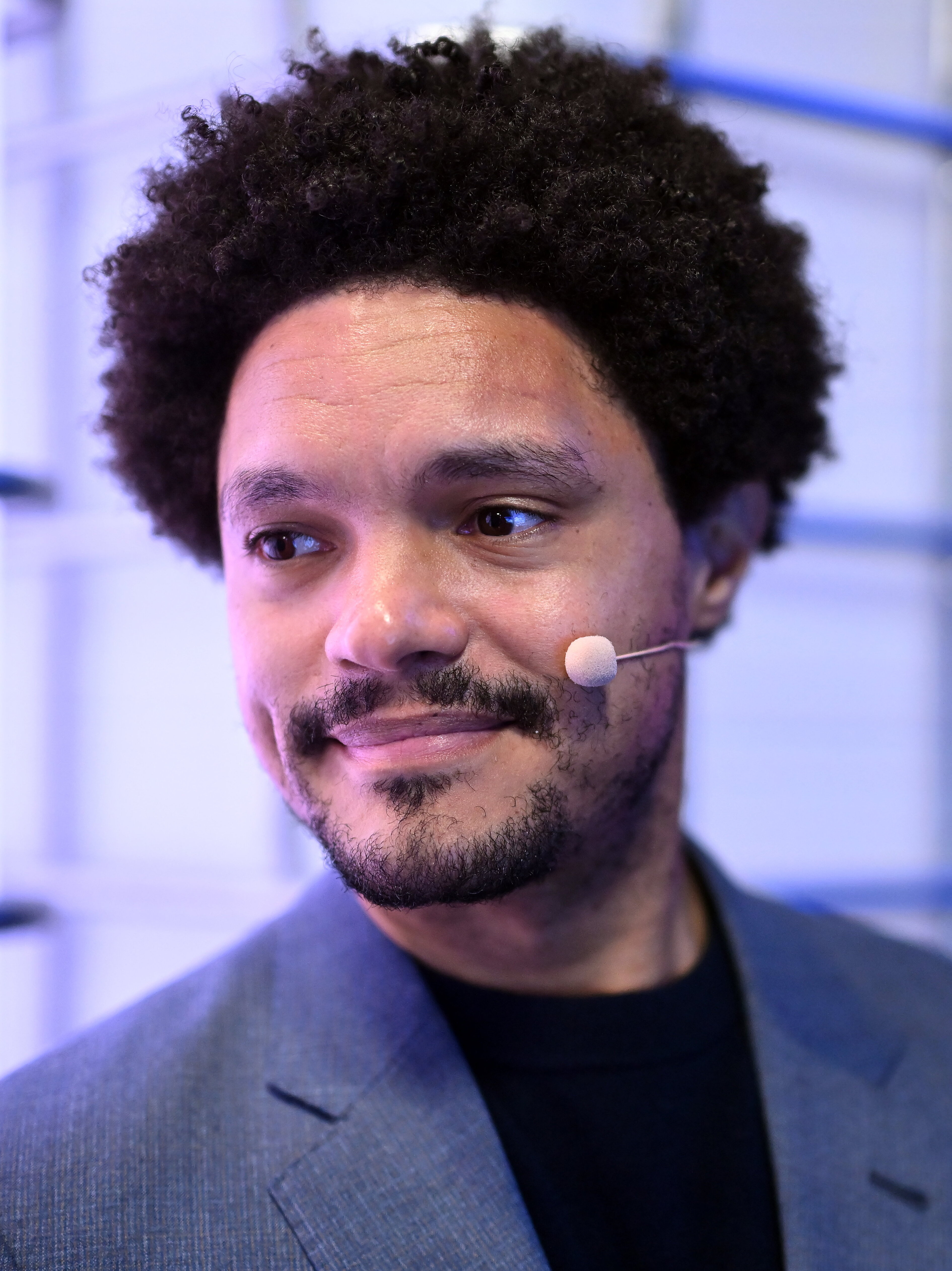
Trevor Noah

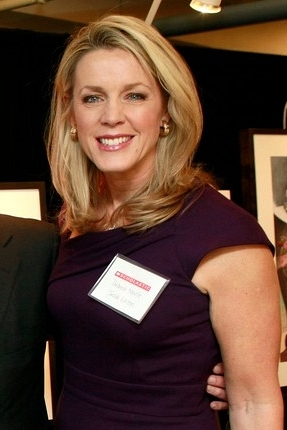
Deborah Norville

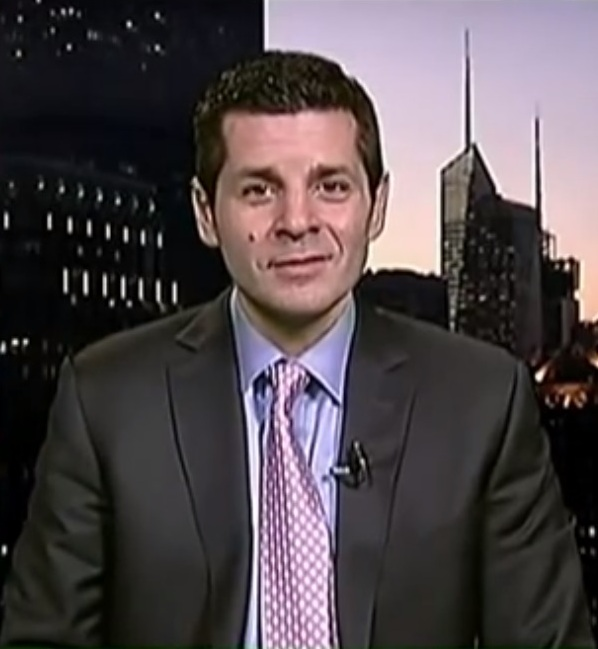
Dean Obeidallah

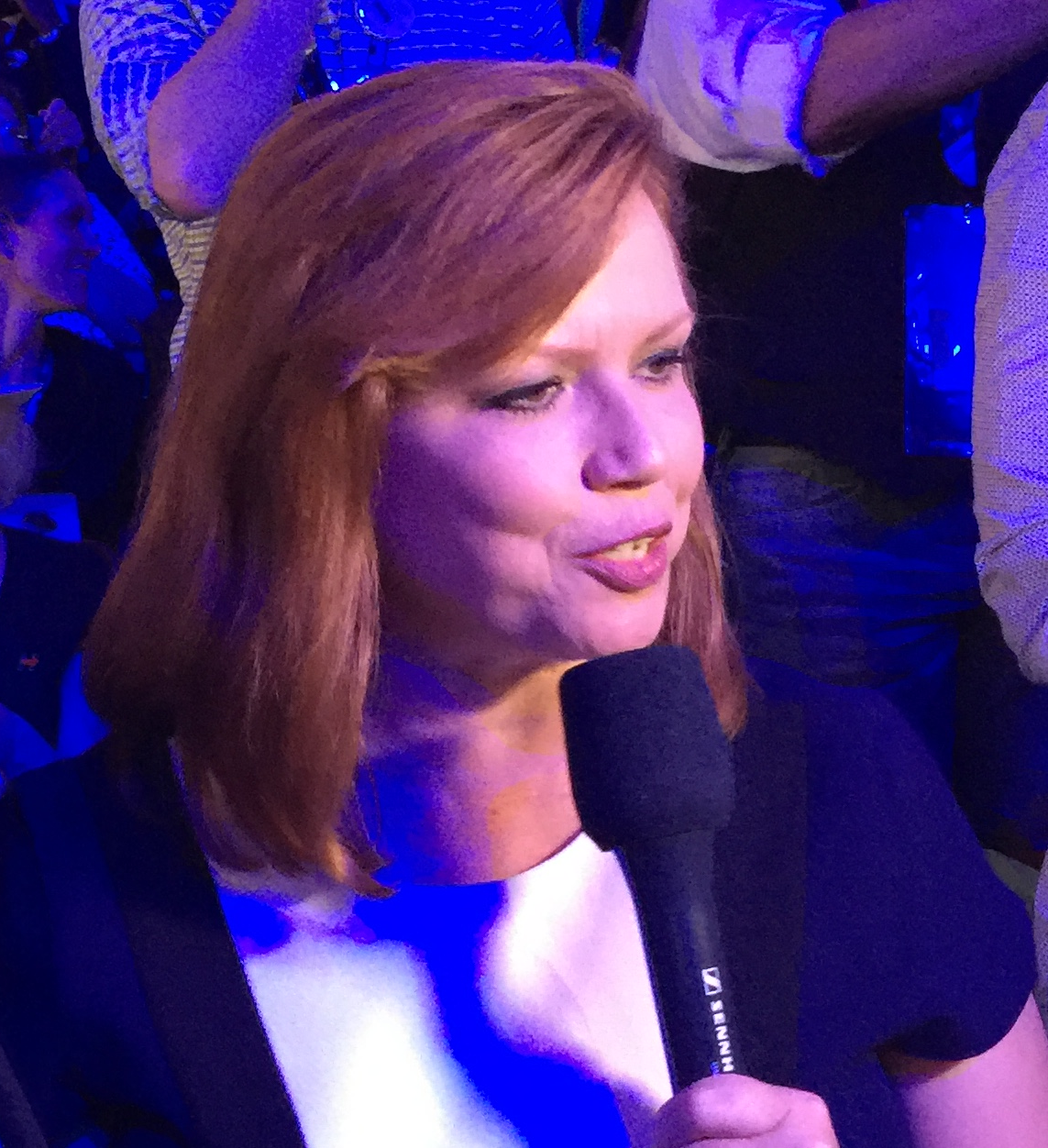
Kelly O'Donnell

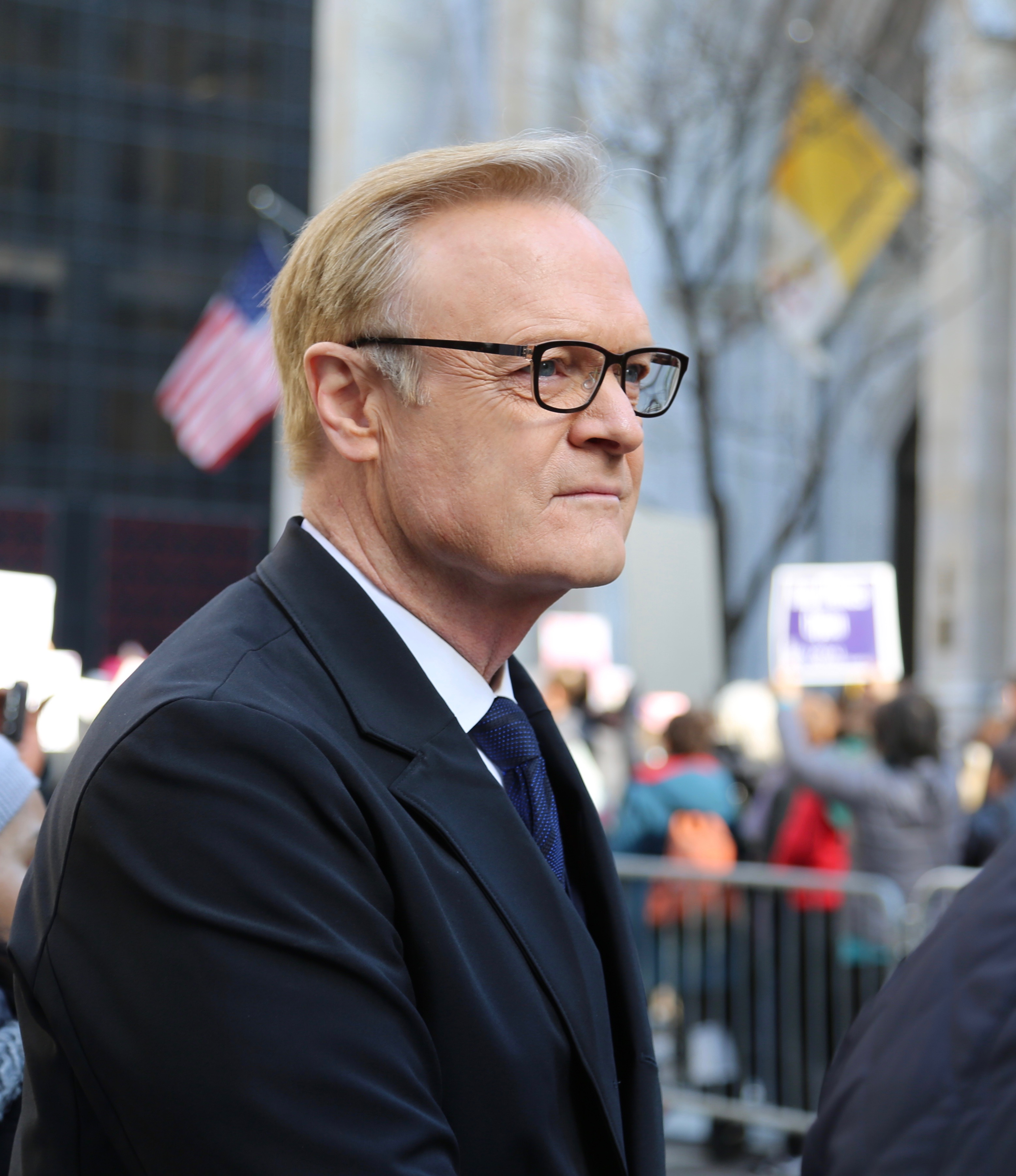
Lawrence O'Donnell

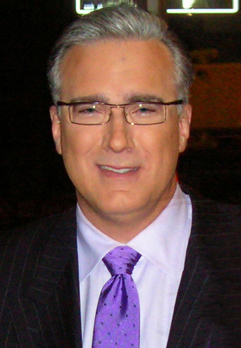
Keith Olbermann

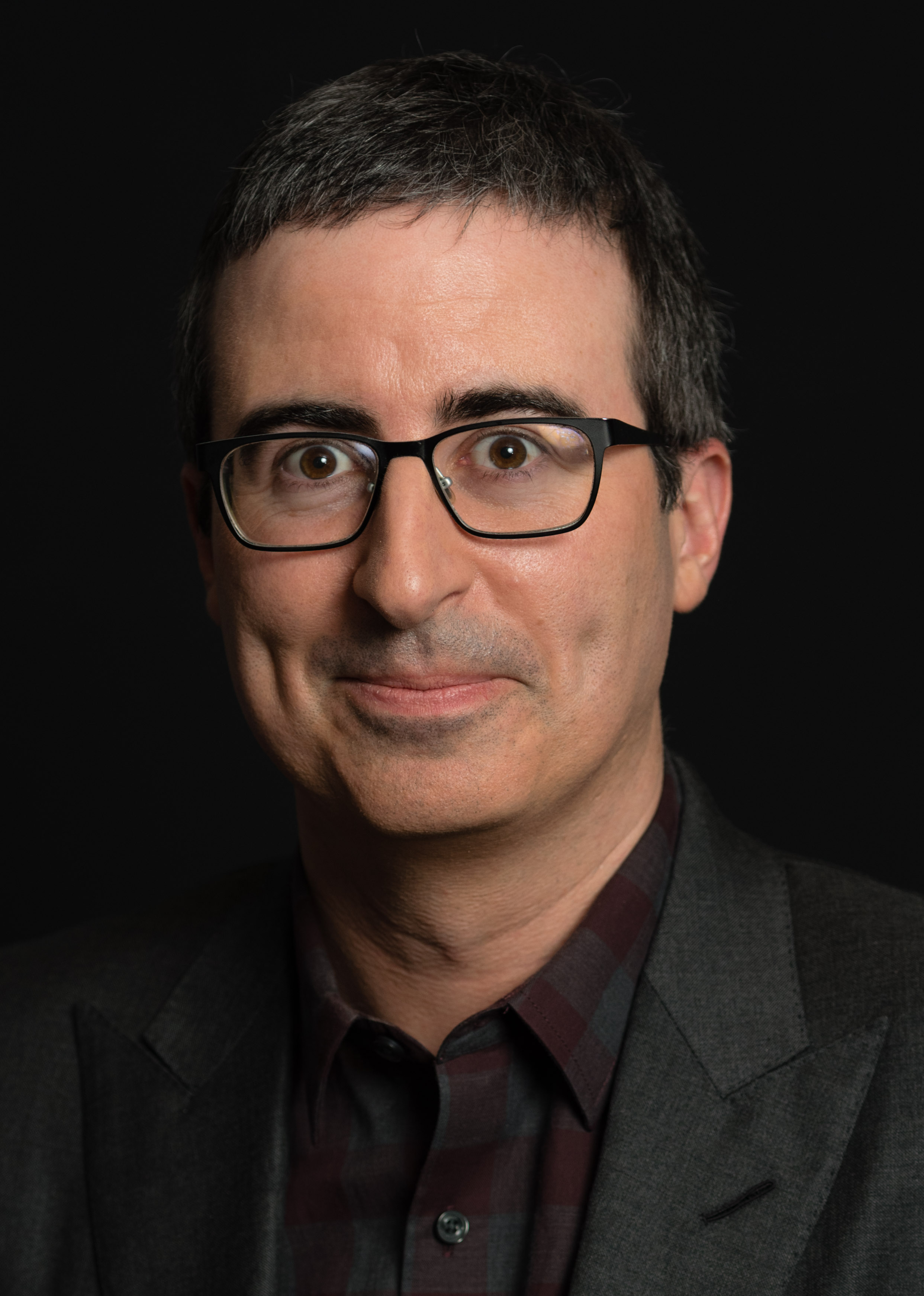
John Oliver

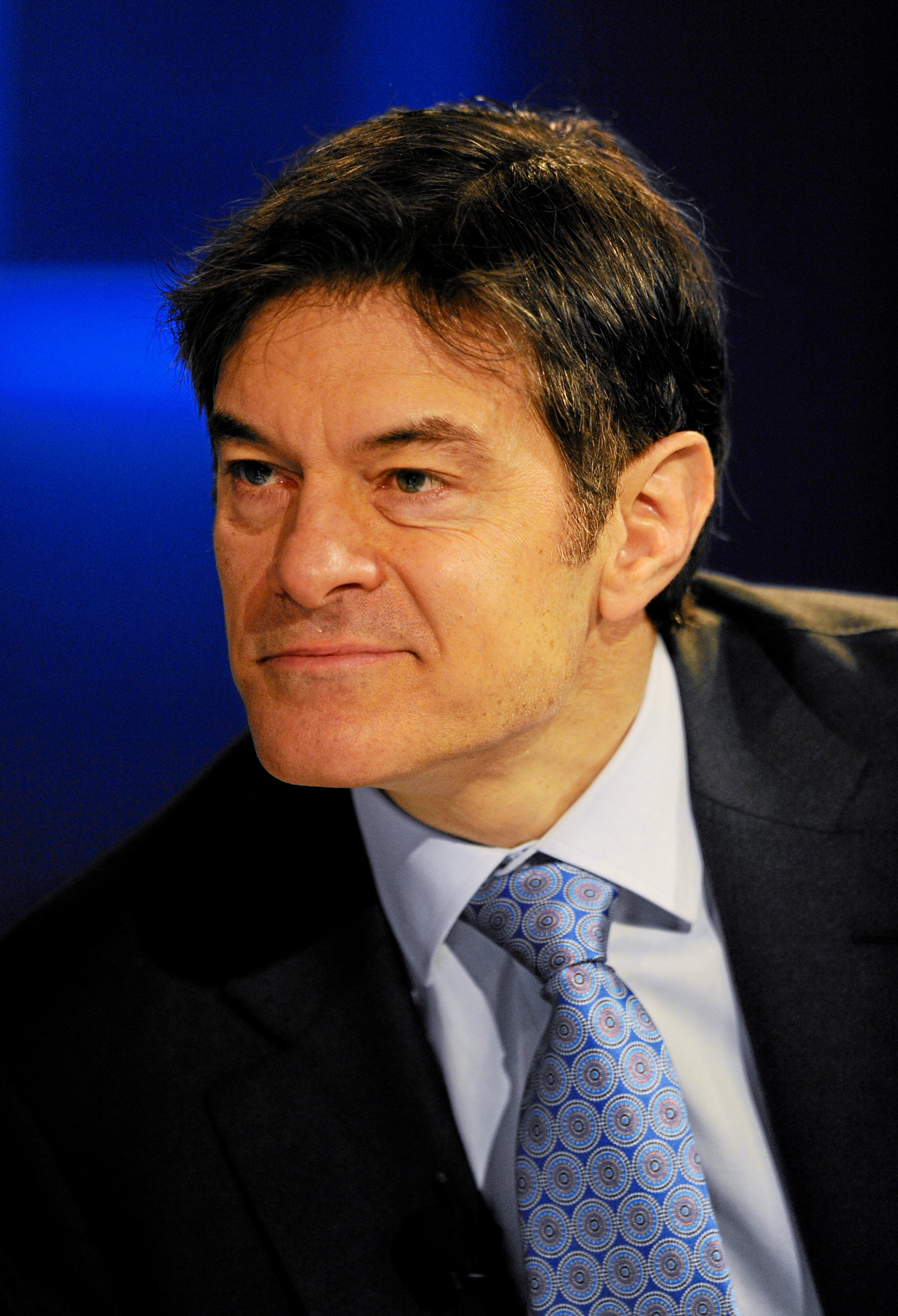
Mehmet Oz

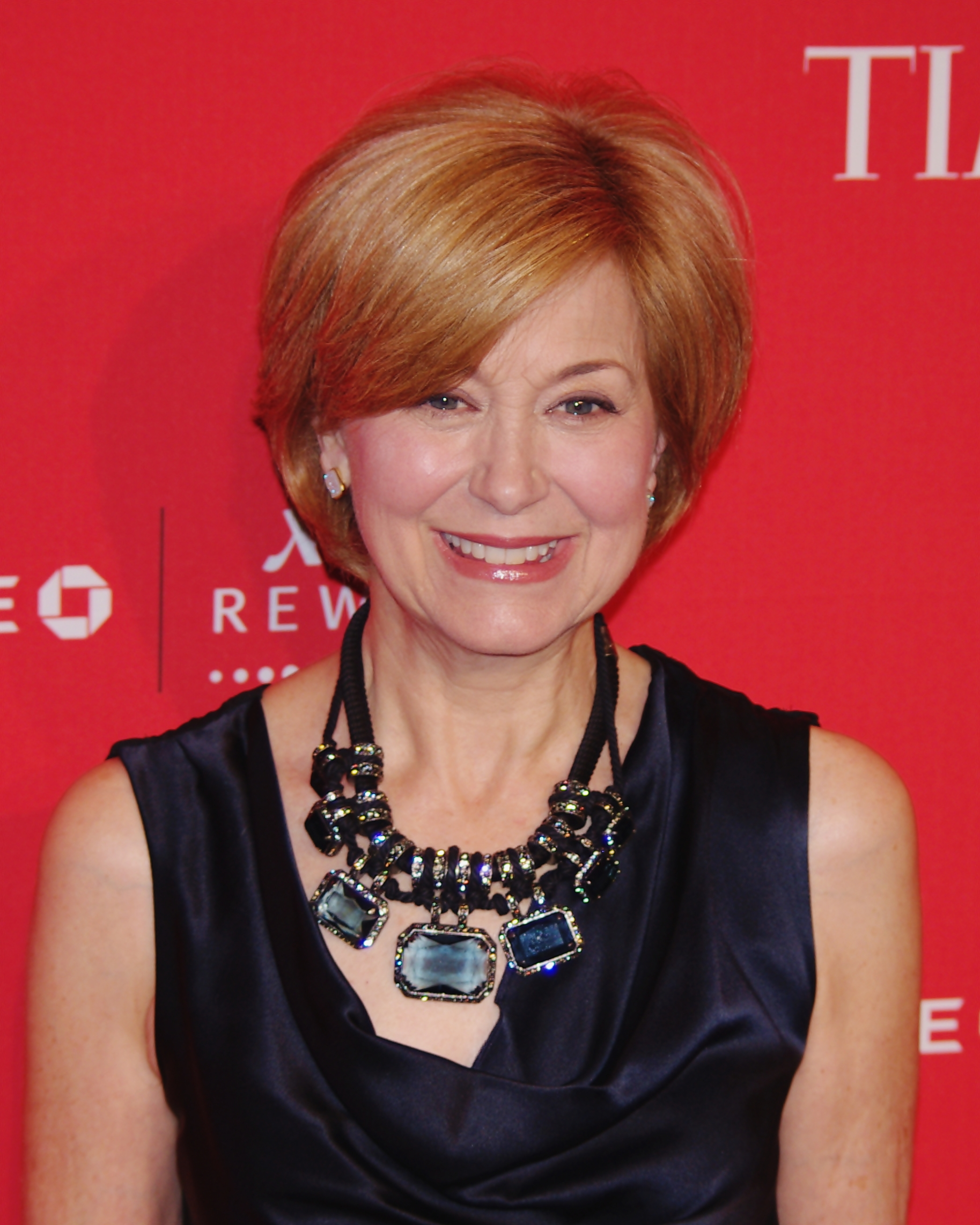
Jane Pauley

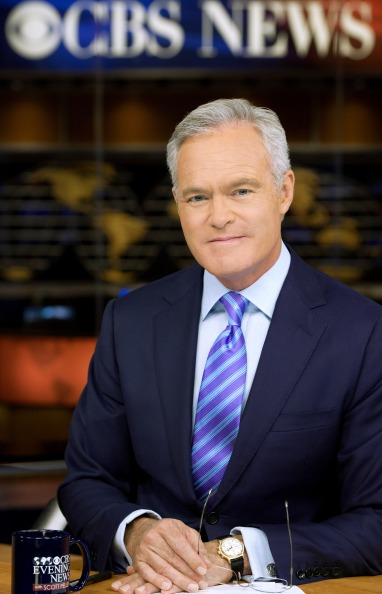
Scott Pelley

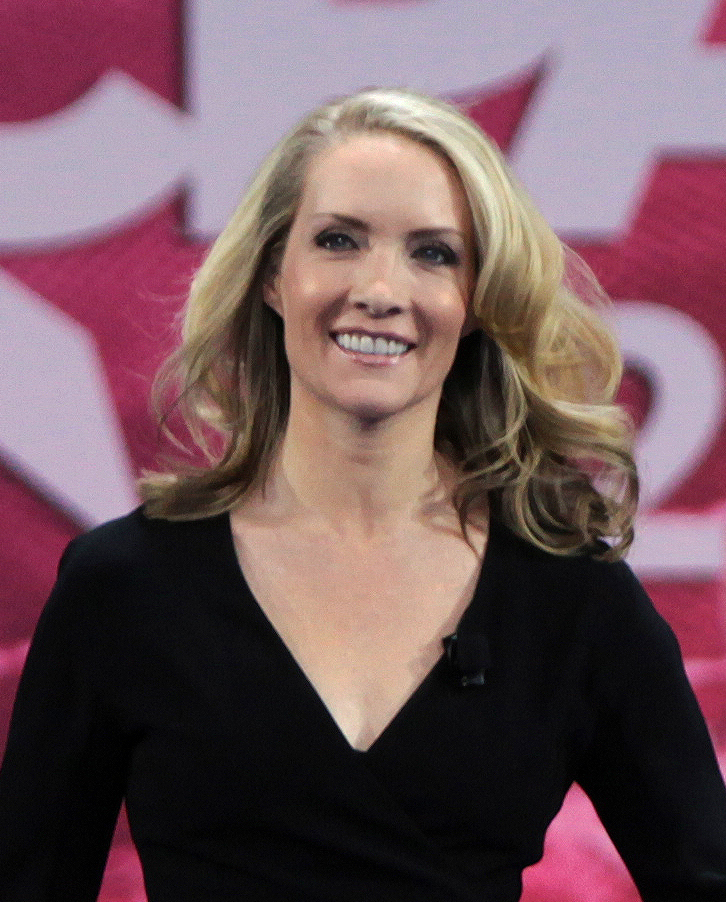
Dana Perino

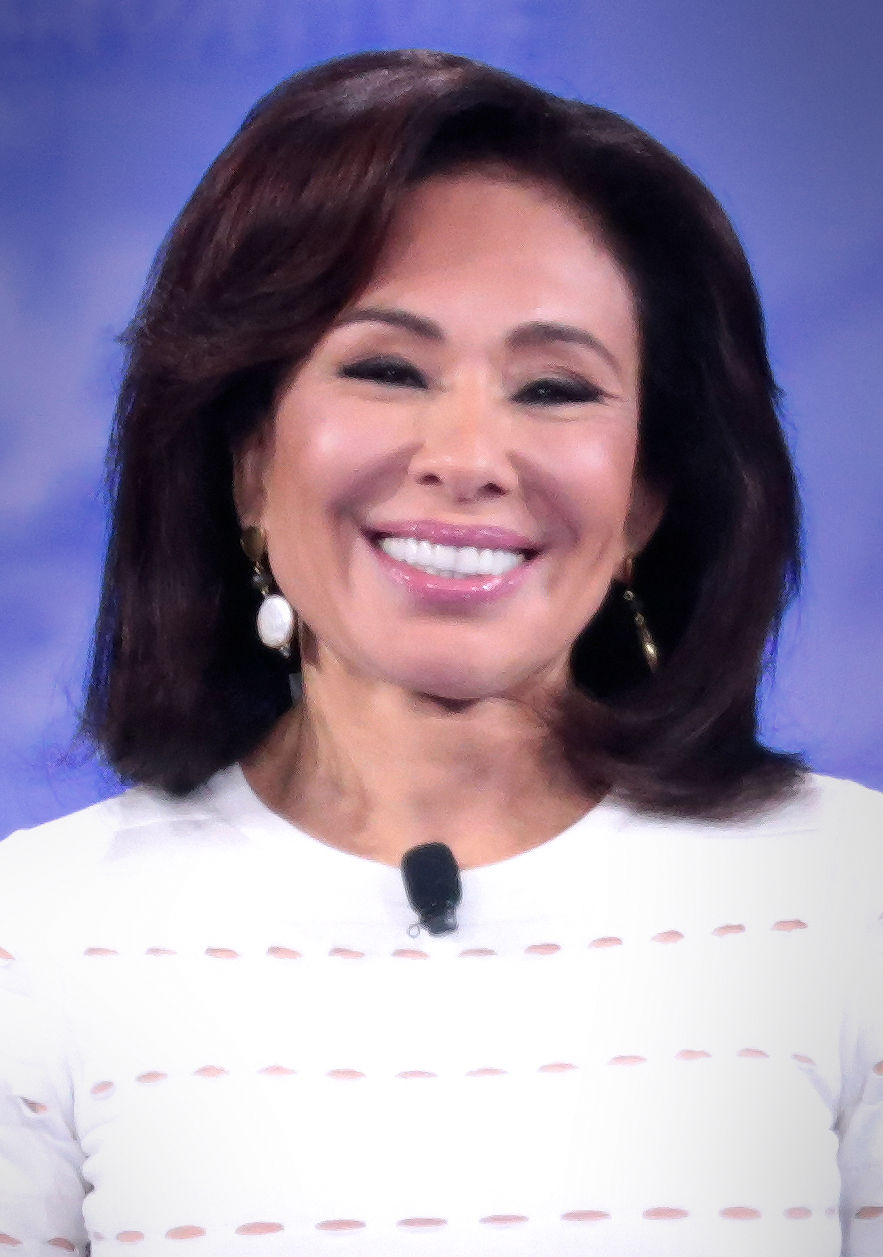
Jeanine Pirro

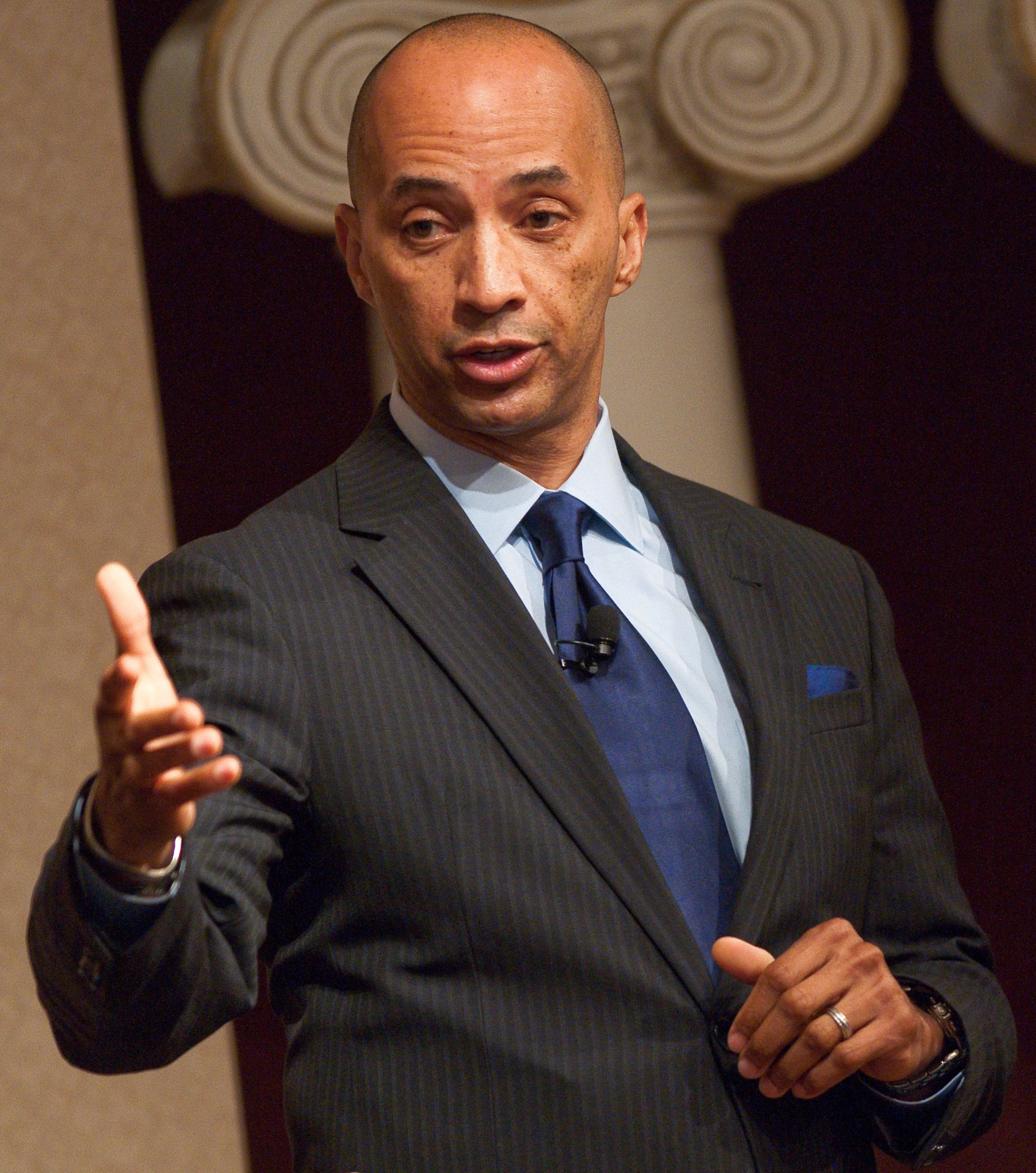
Byron Pitts

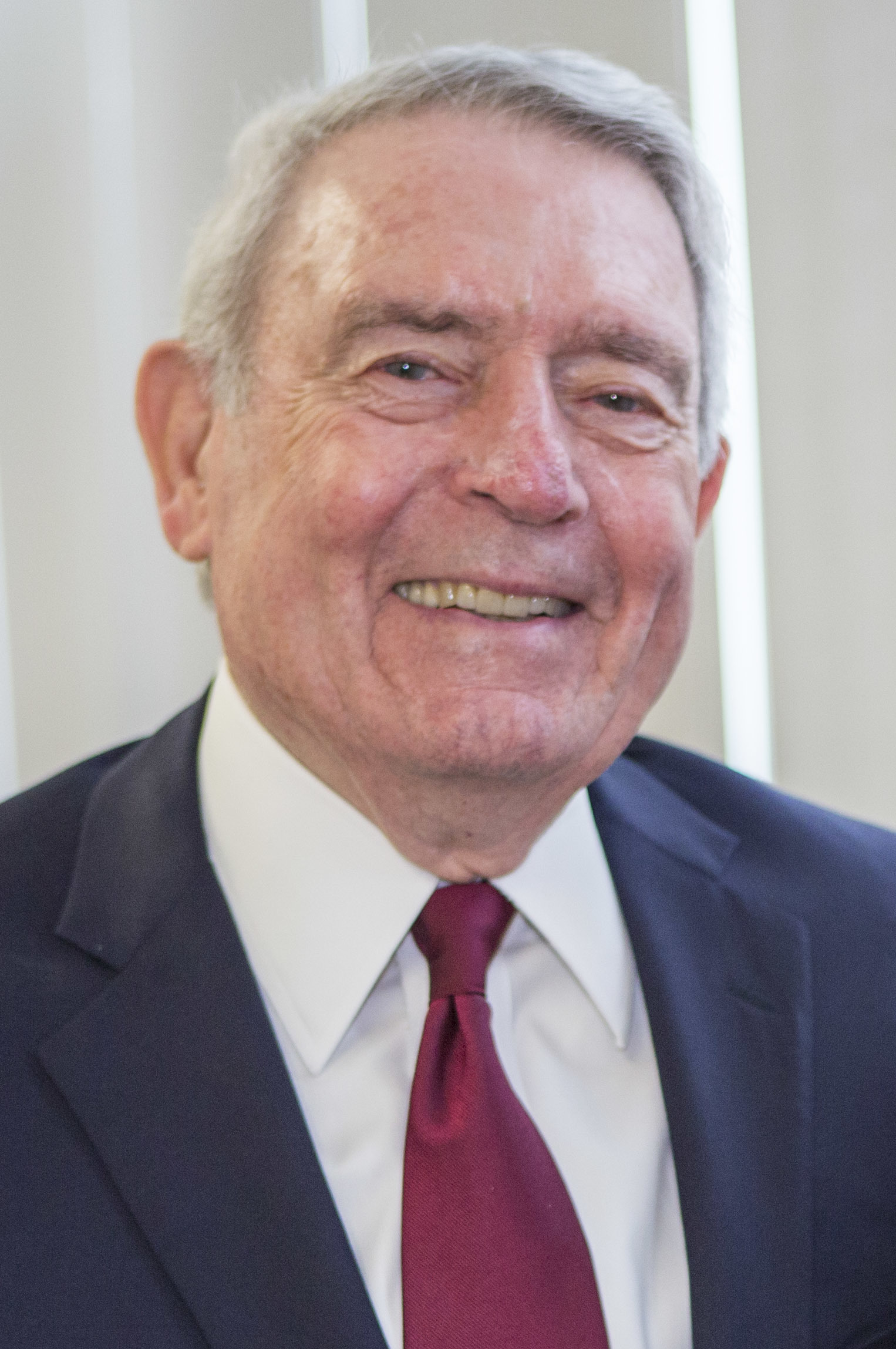
Dan Rather

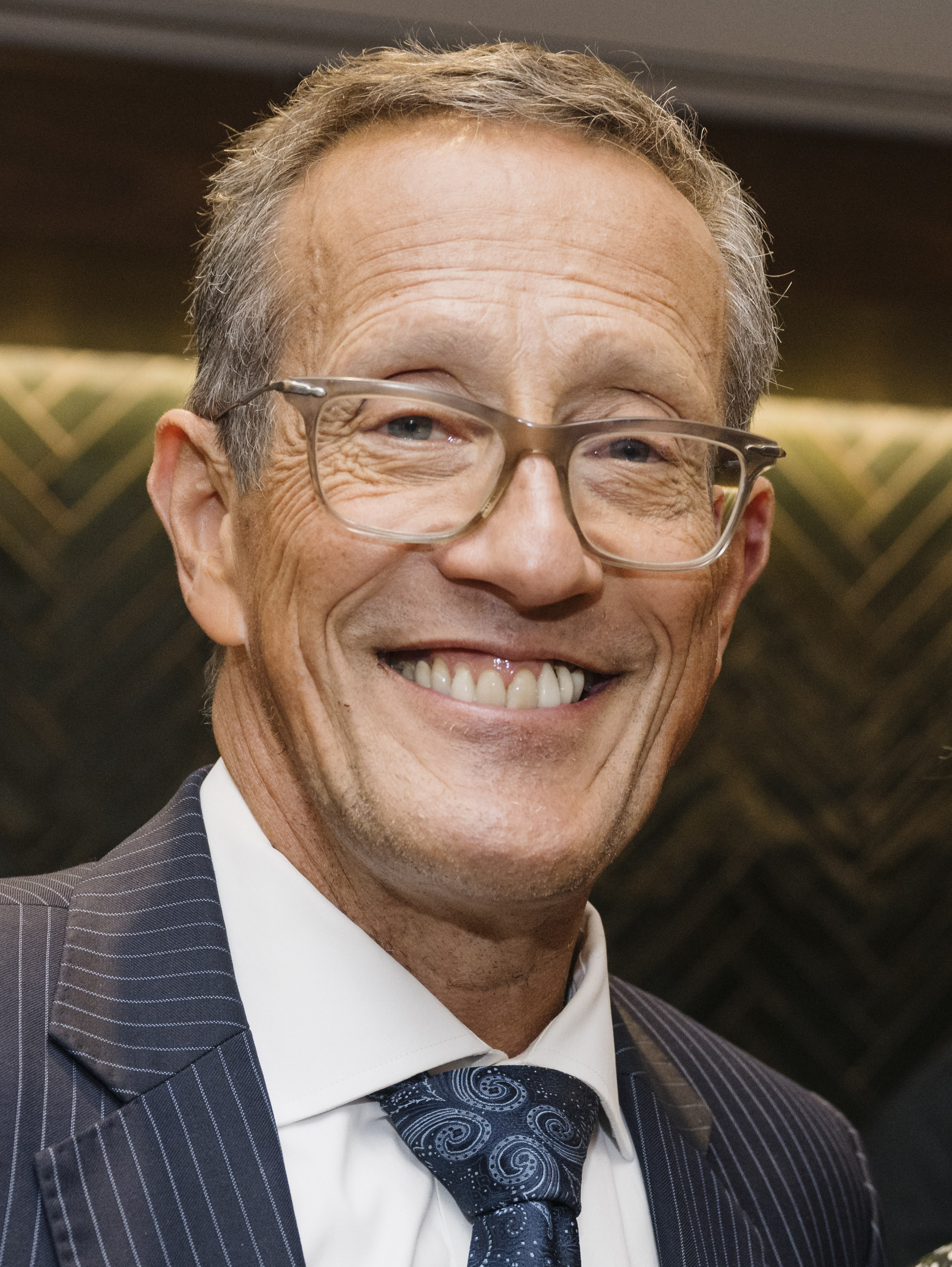
Richard Quest

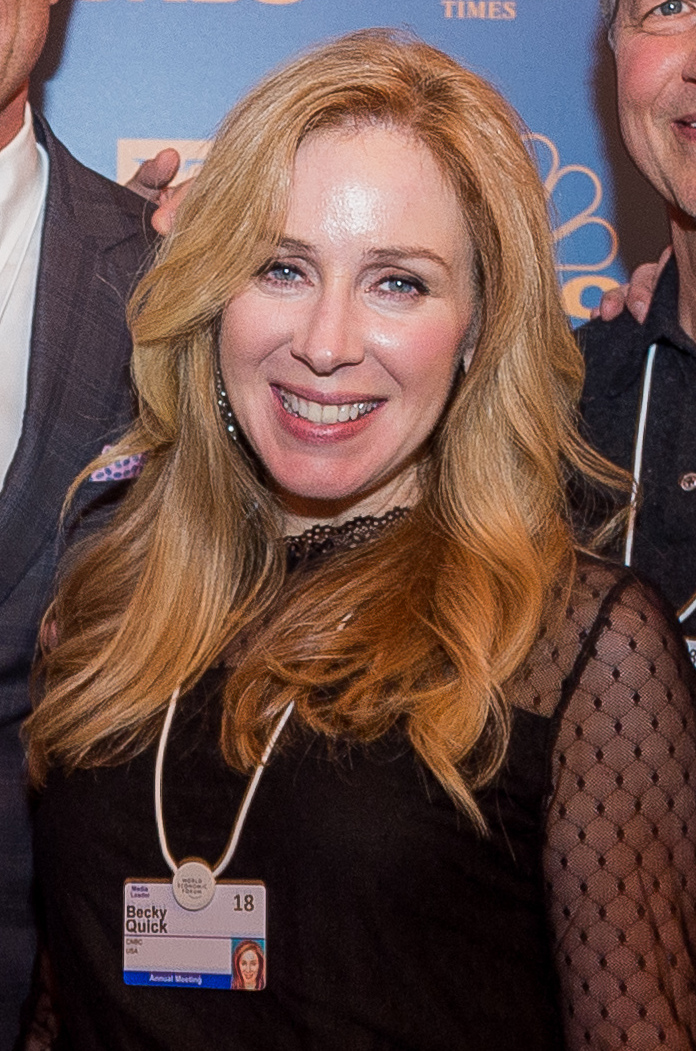
Becky Quick

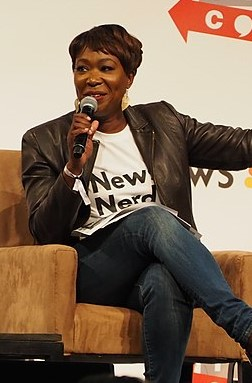
Joy Reid

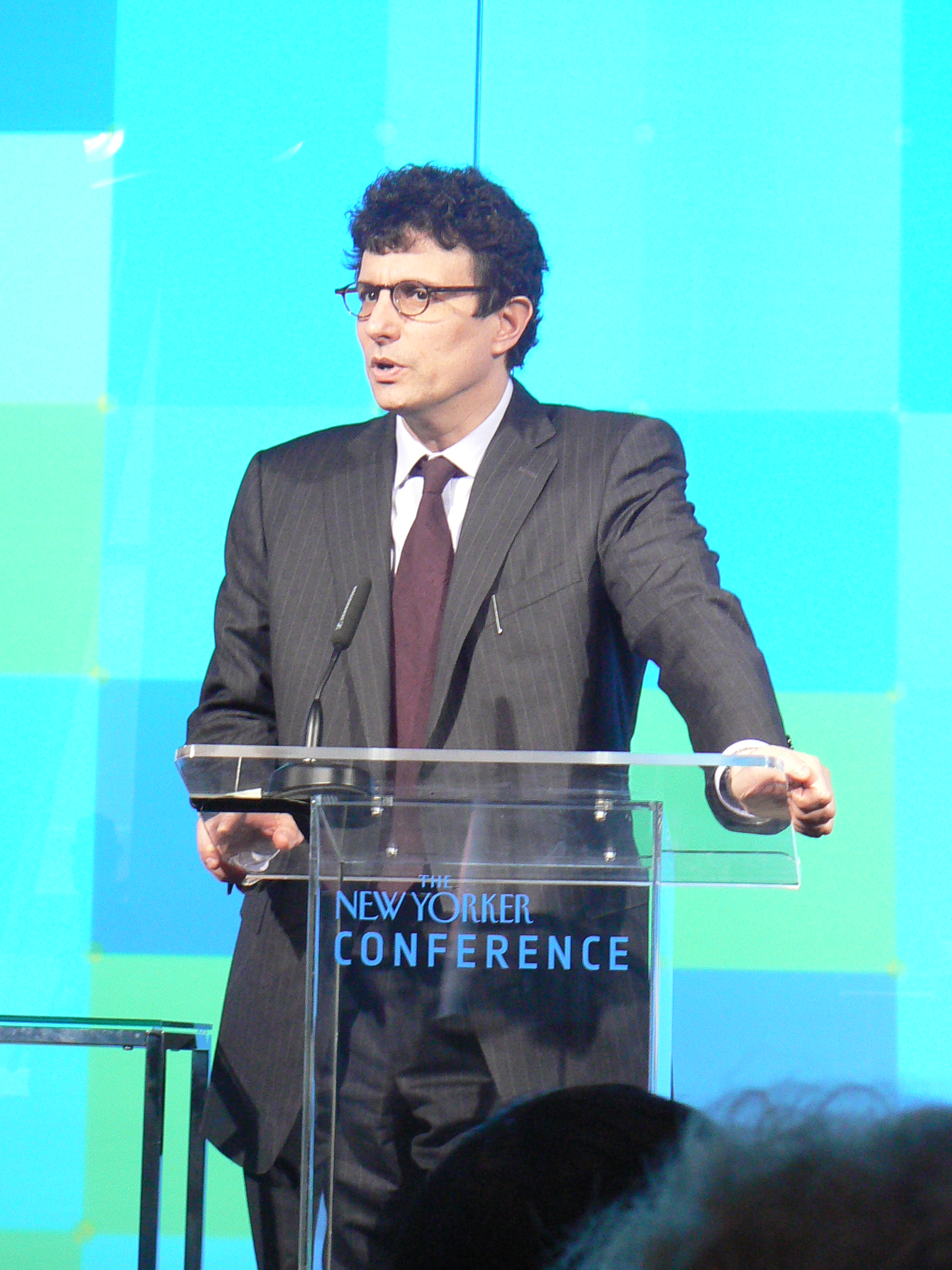
David Remnick

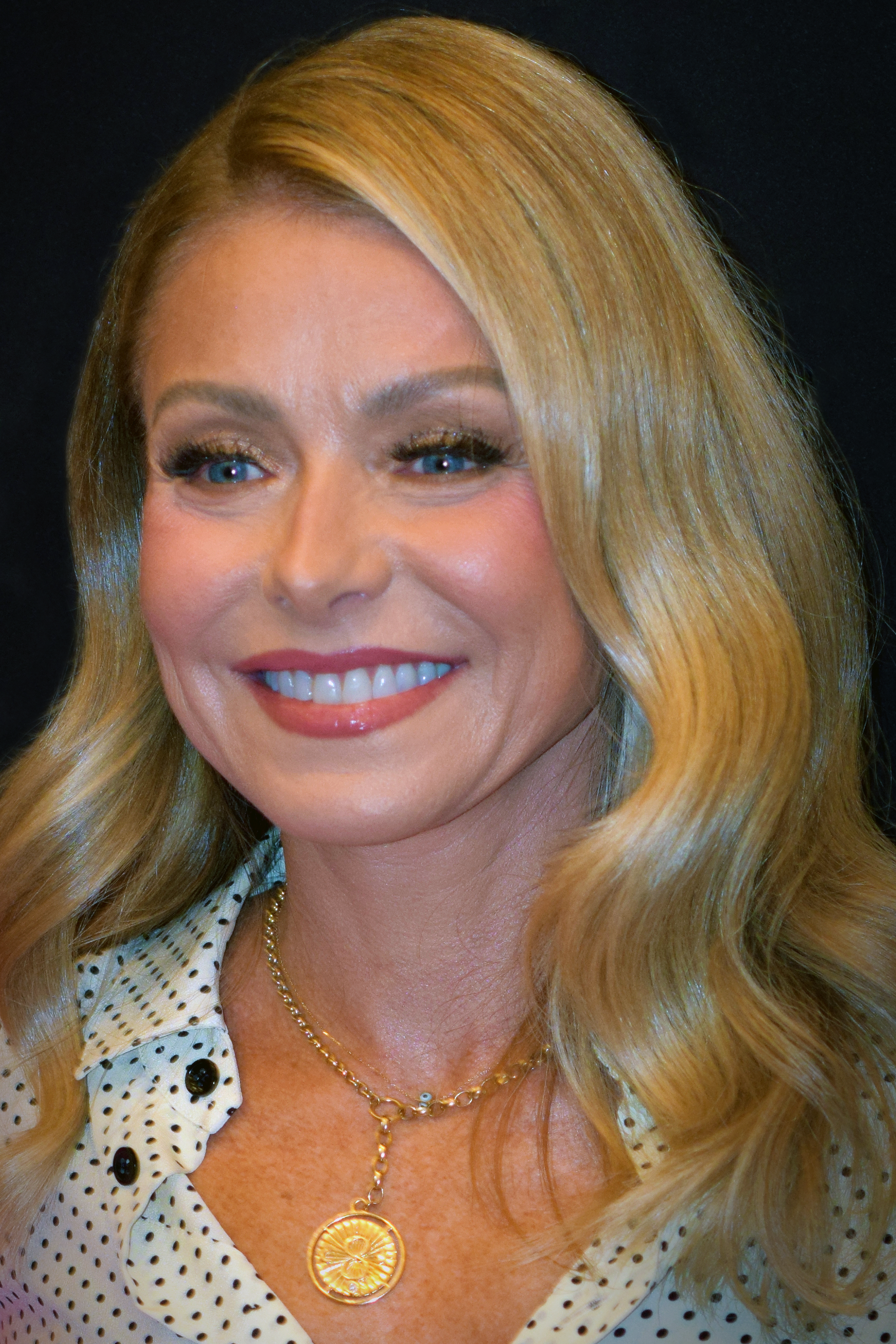
Kelly Ripa

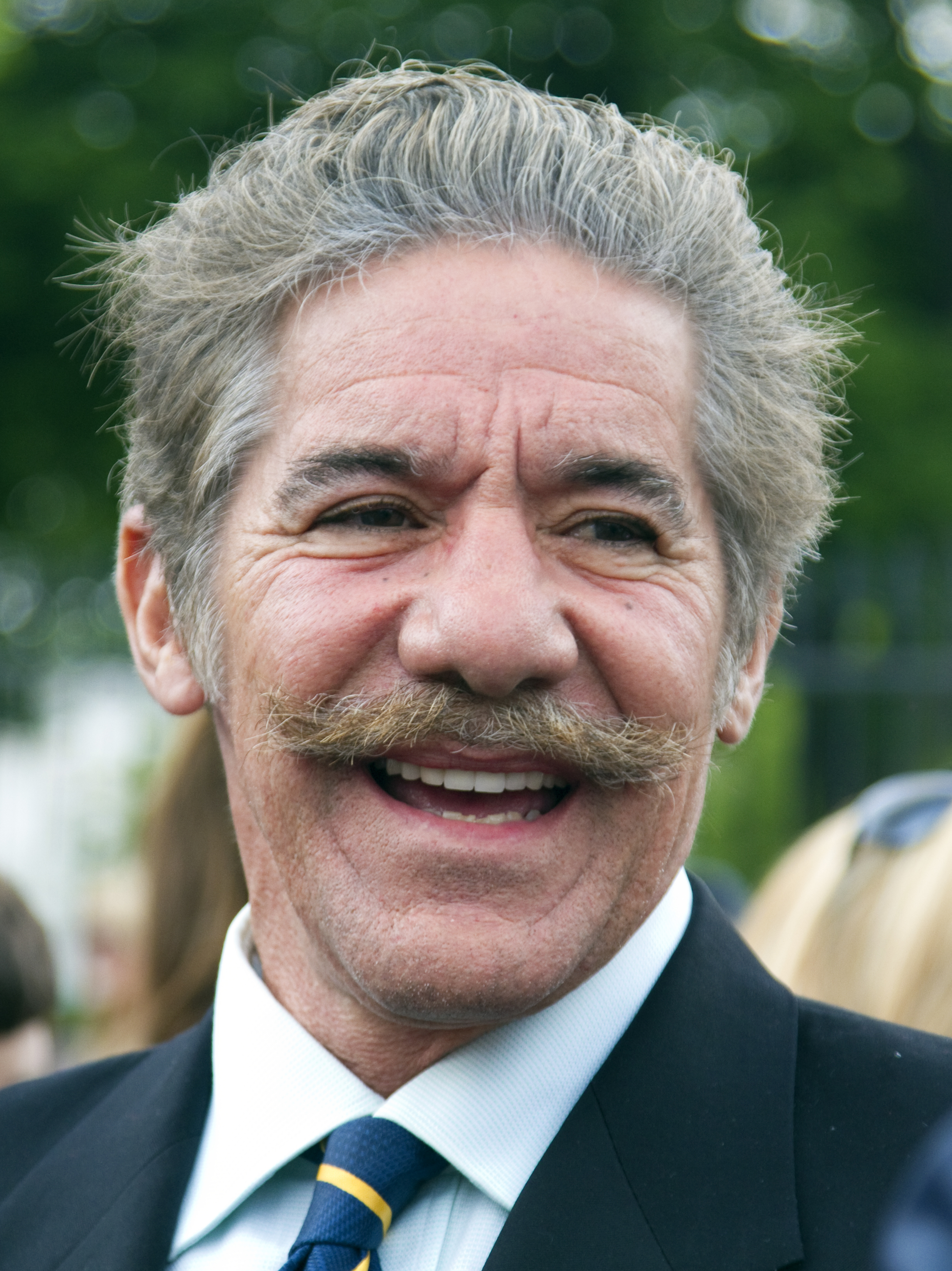
Geraldo Rivera

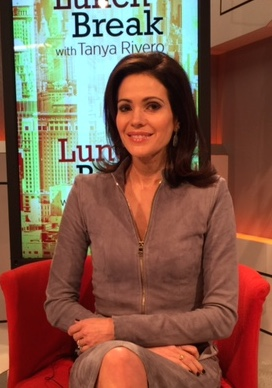
Tanya Rivero

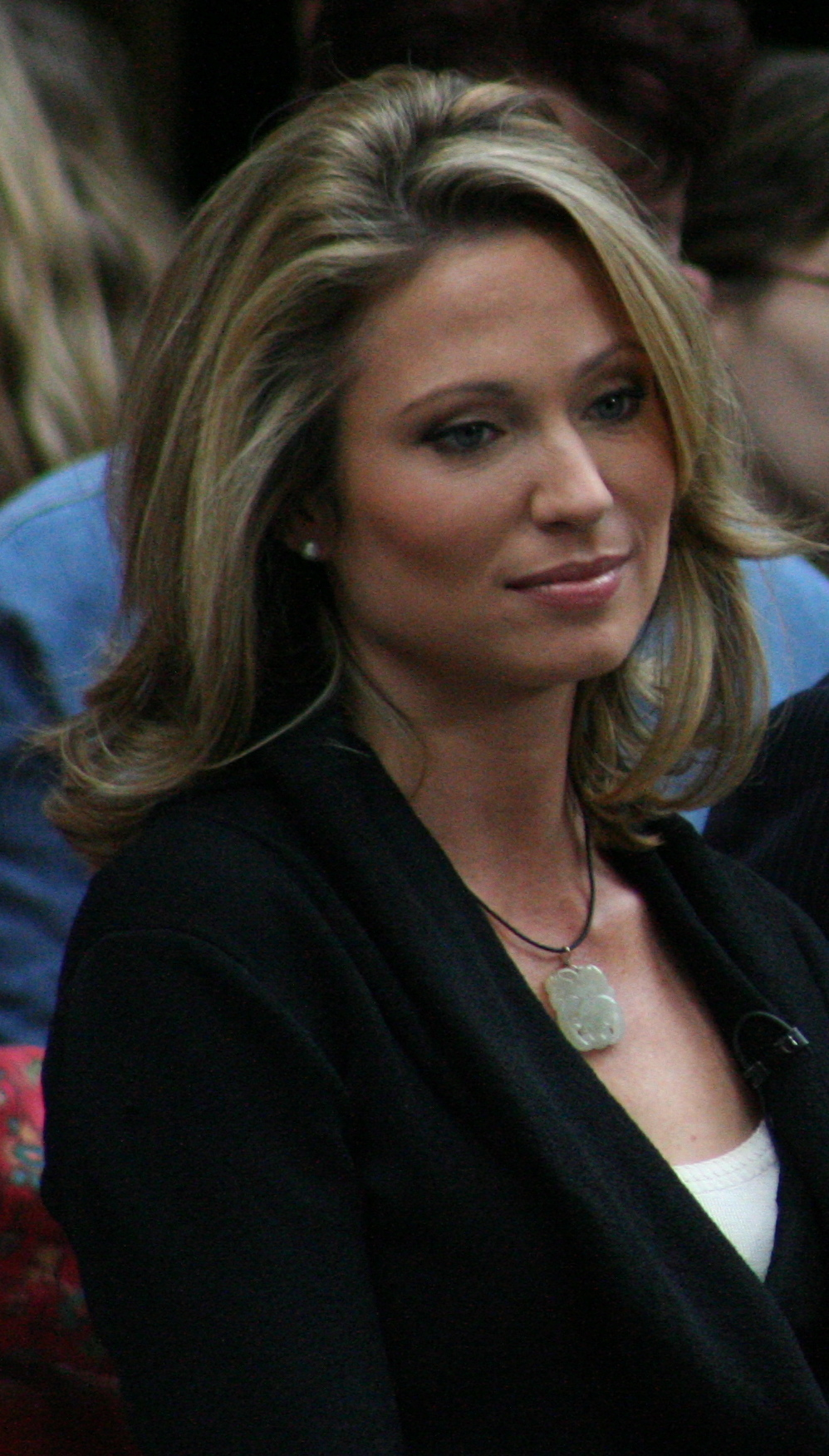
Amy Robach

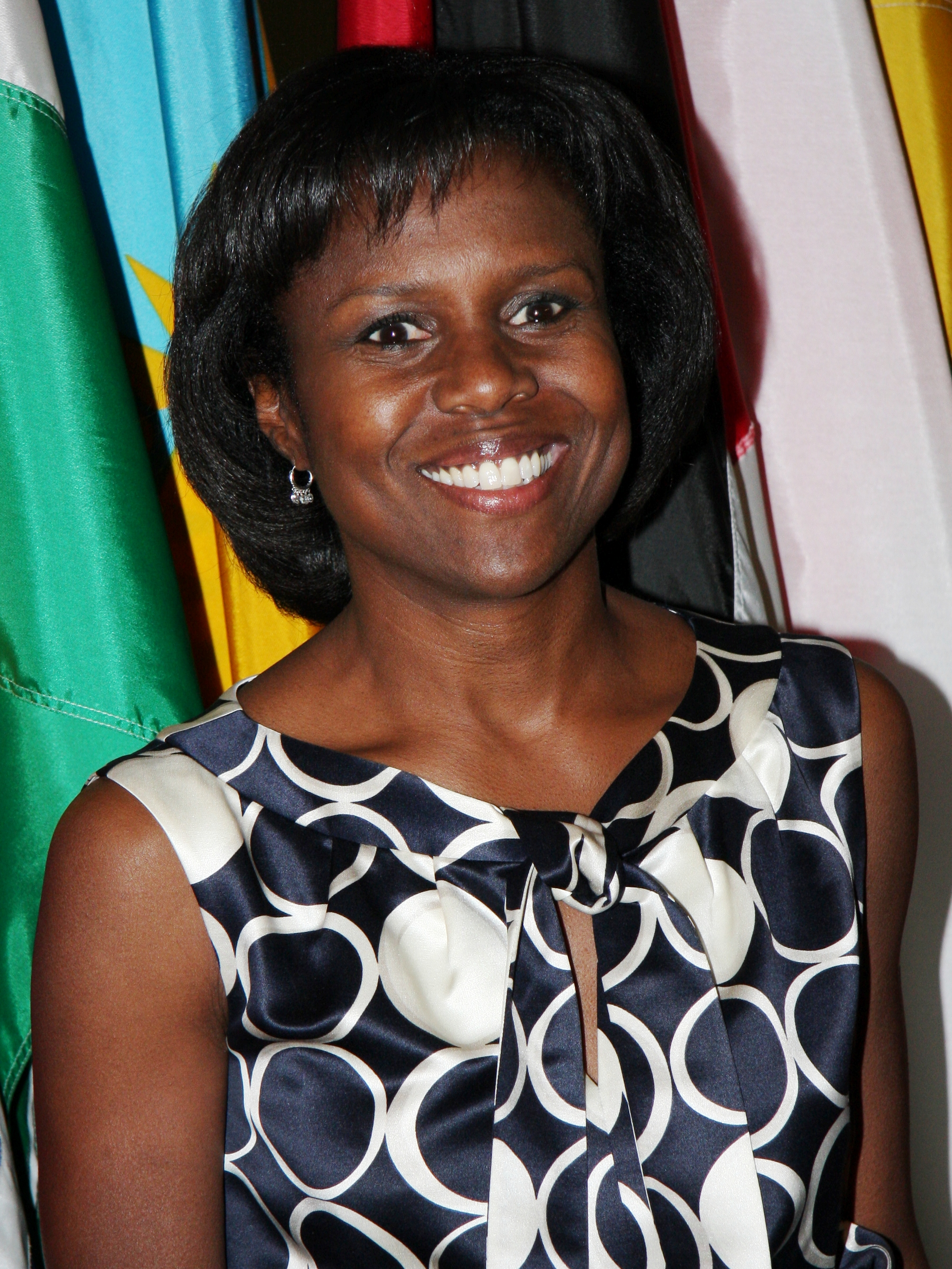
Deborah Roberts

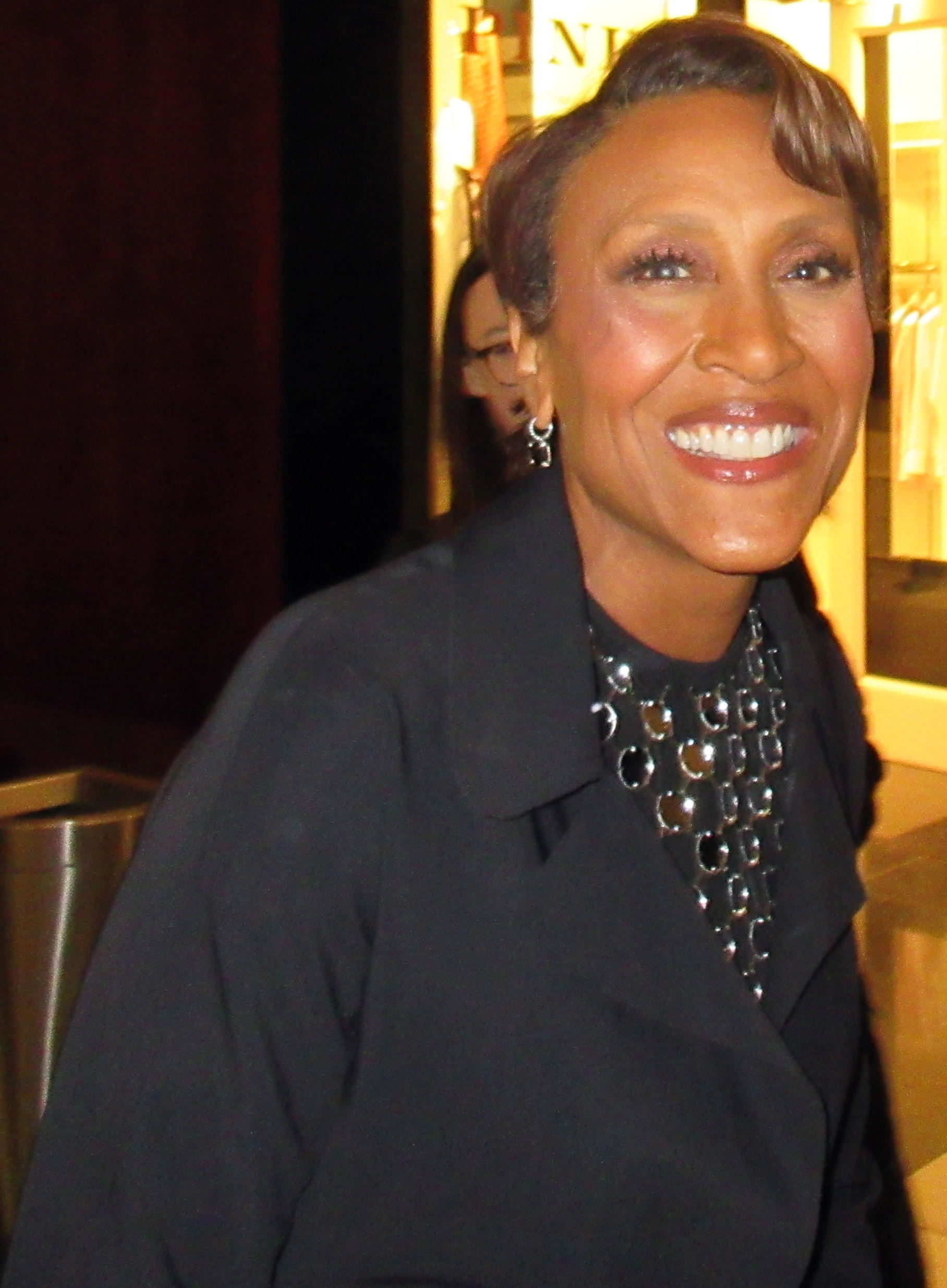
Robin Roberts

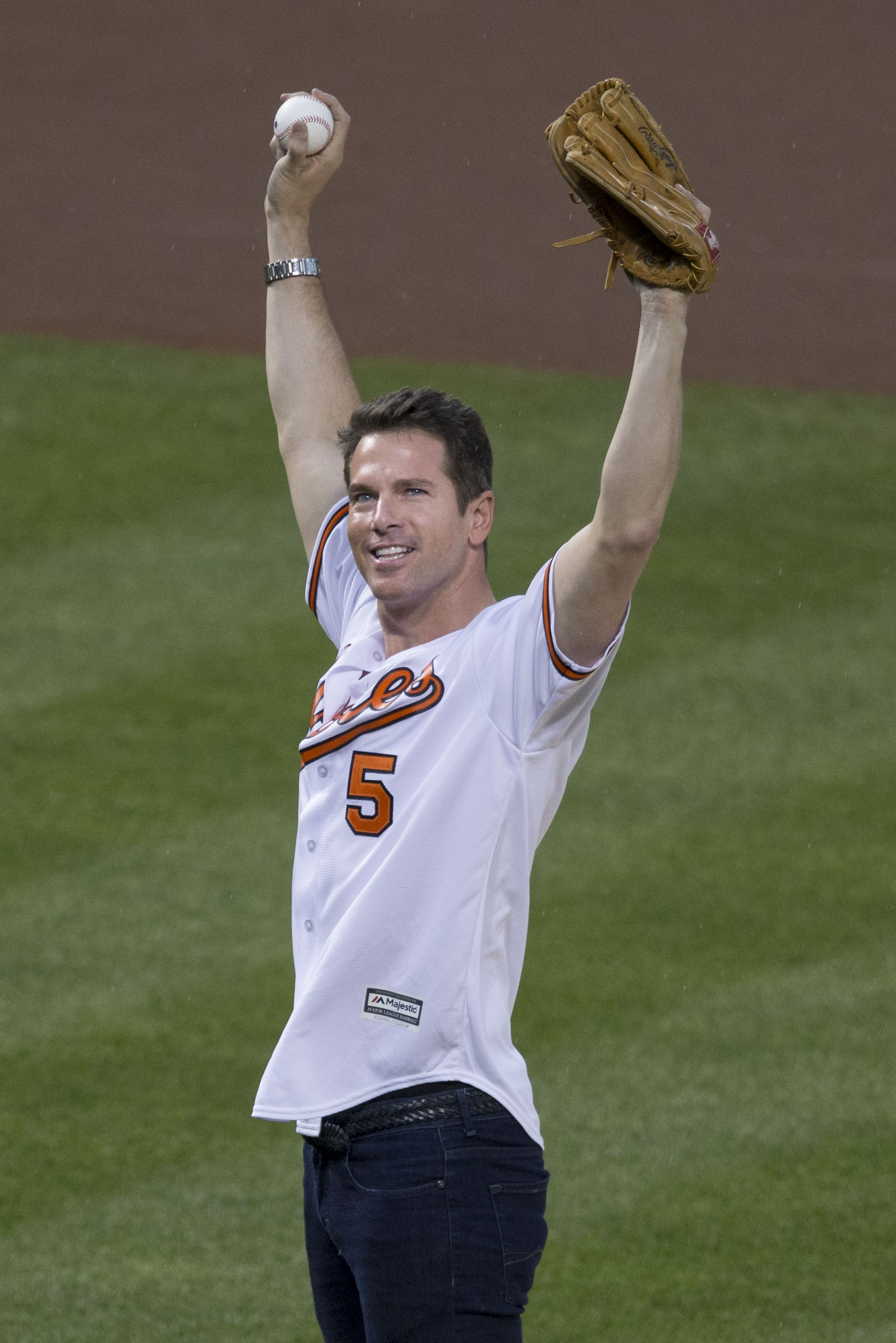
Thomas Roberts

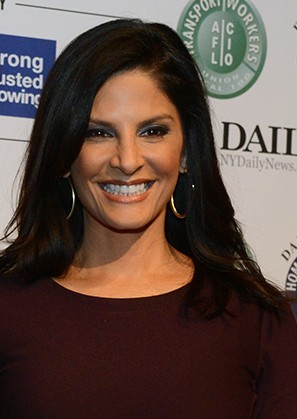
Darlene Rodriguez

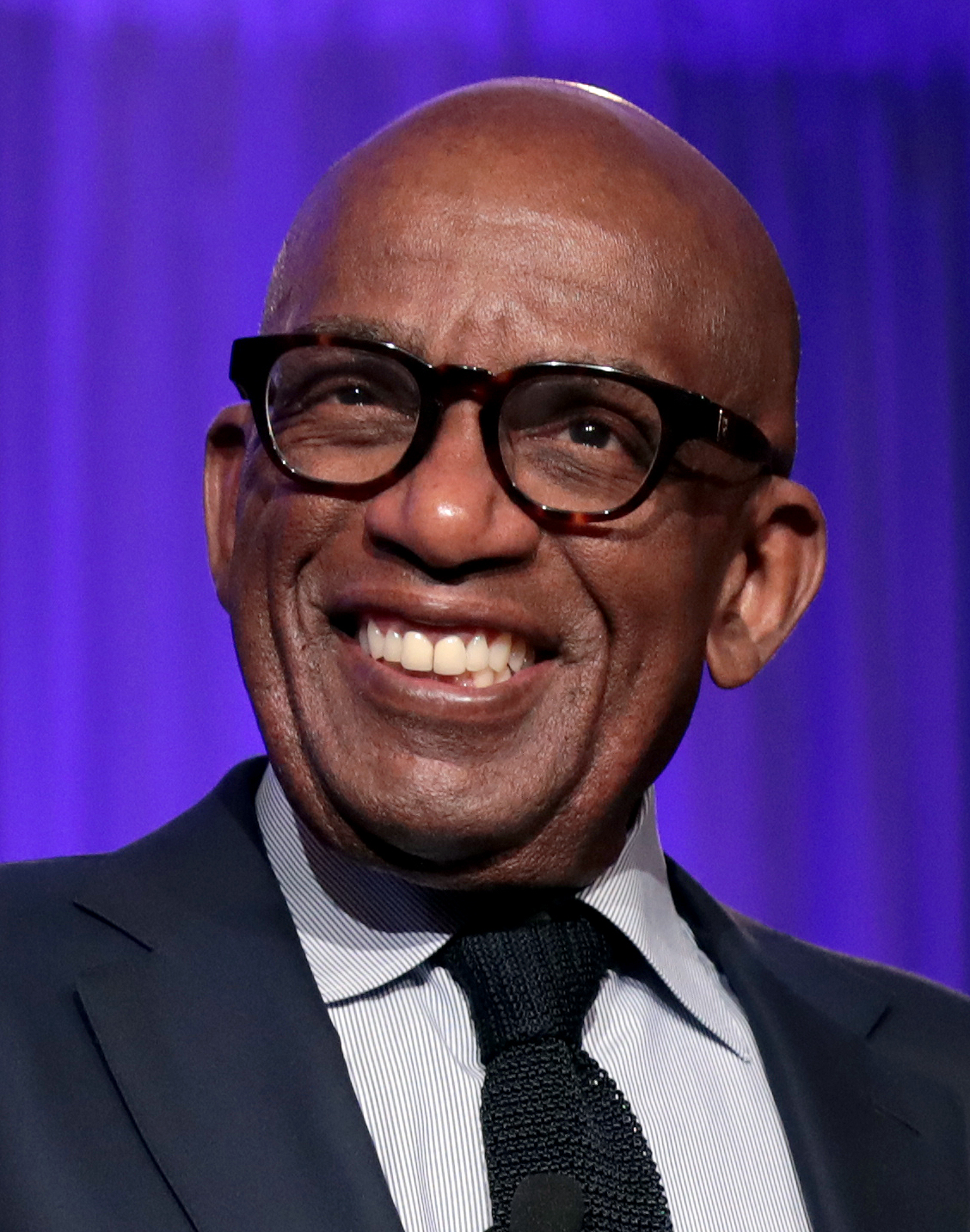
Al Roker

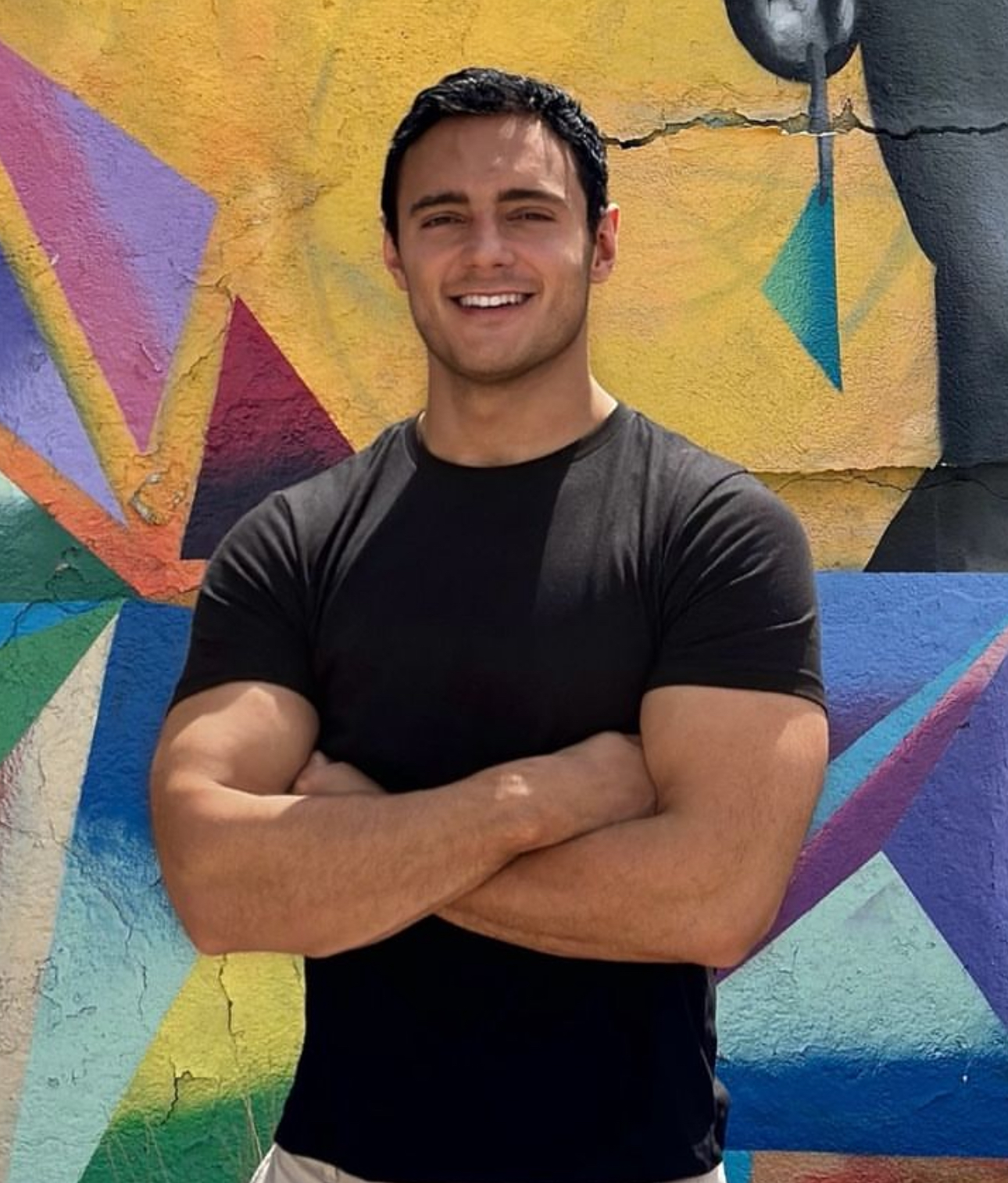
Steven Romo

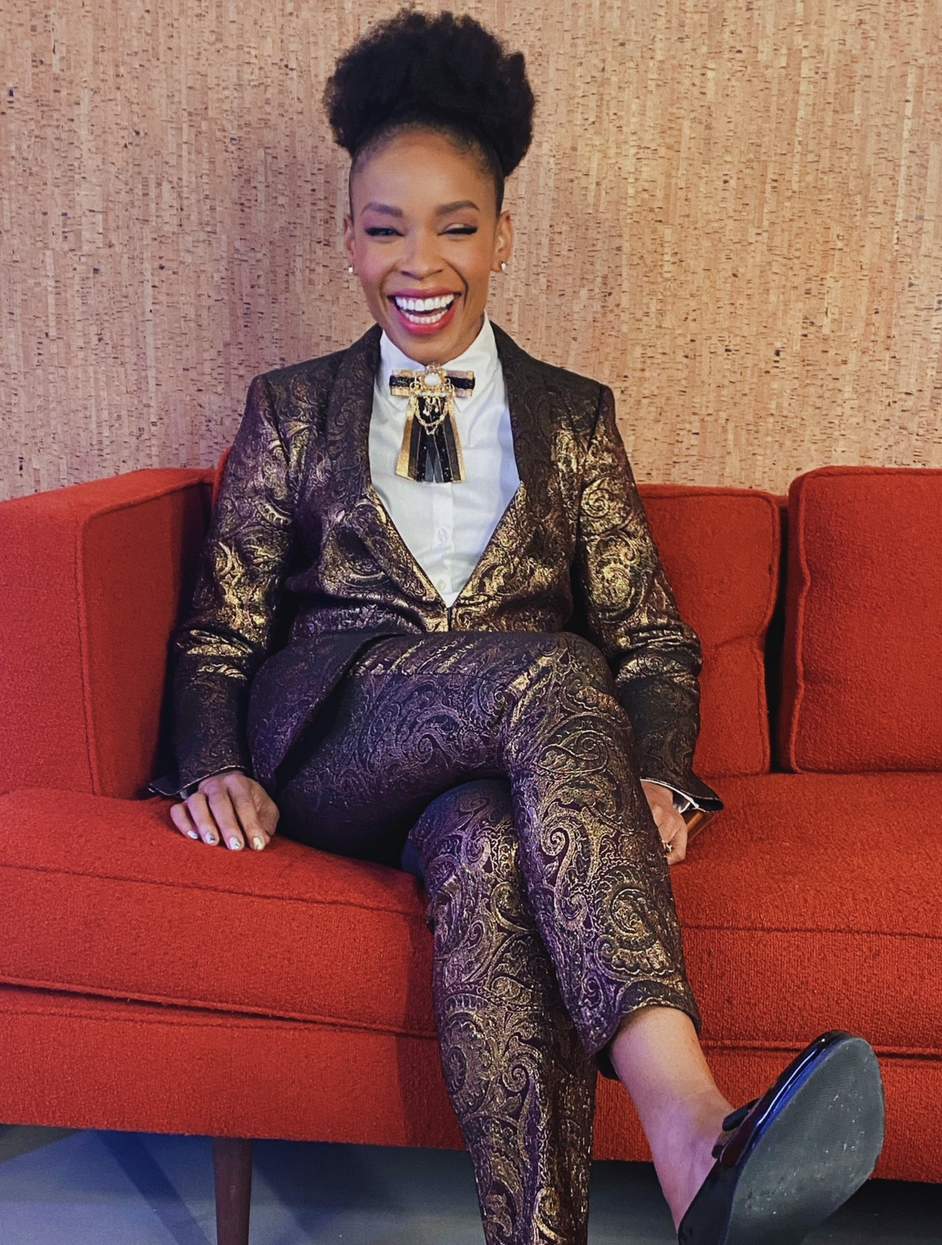
Amber Ruffin

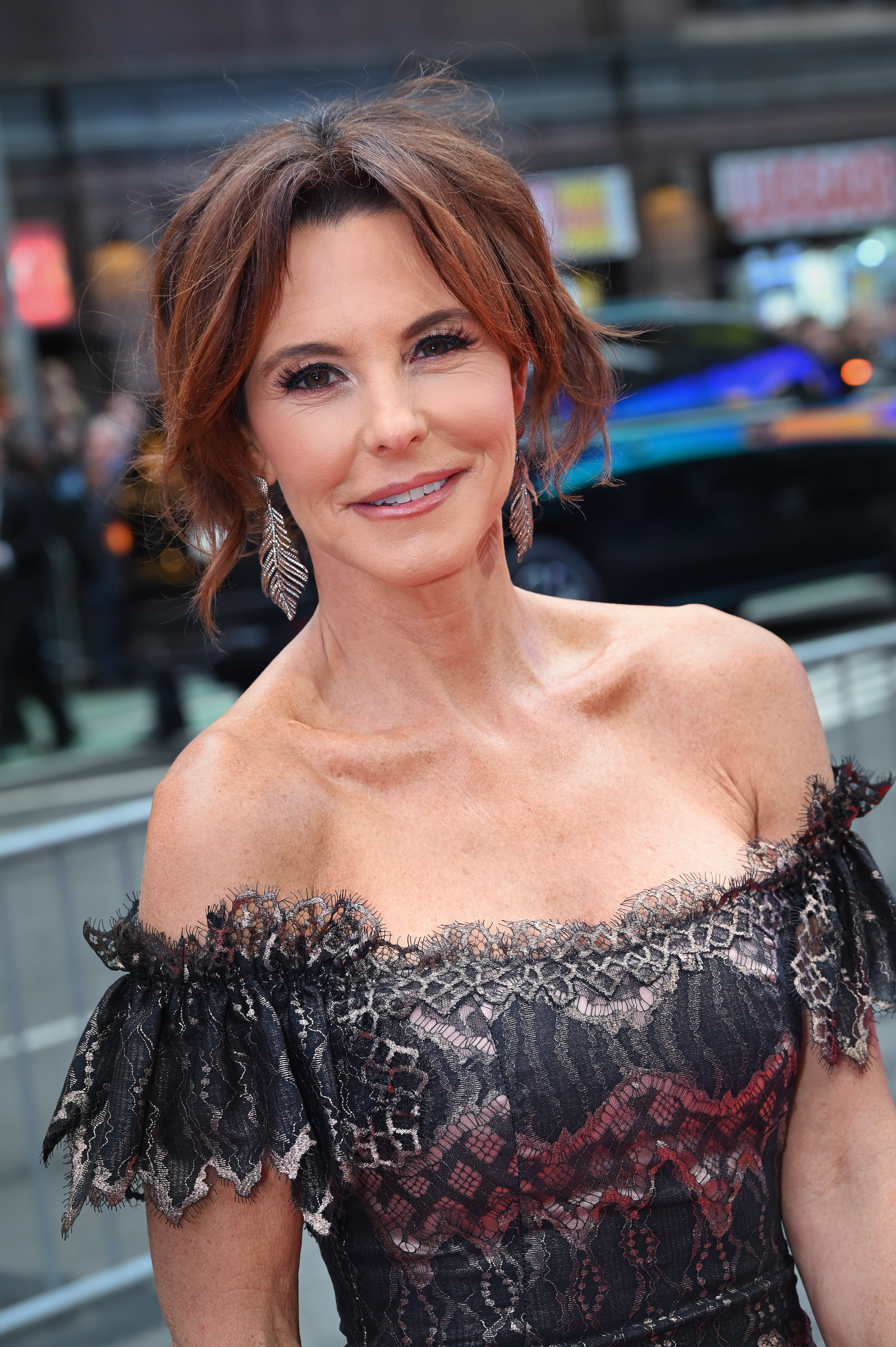
Stephanie Ruhle

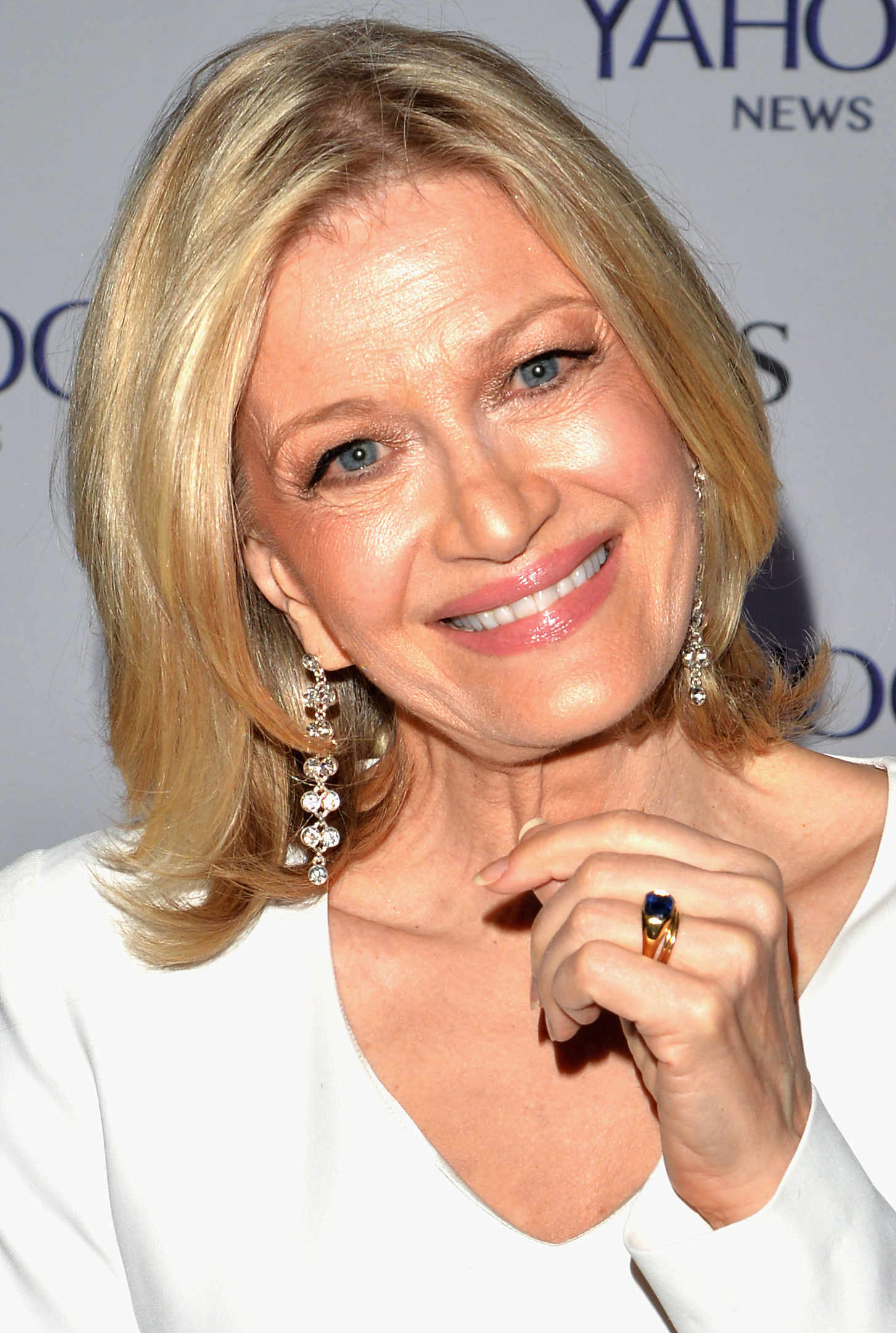
Diane Sawyer

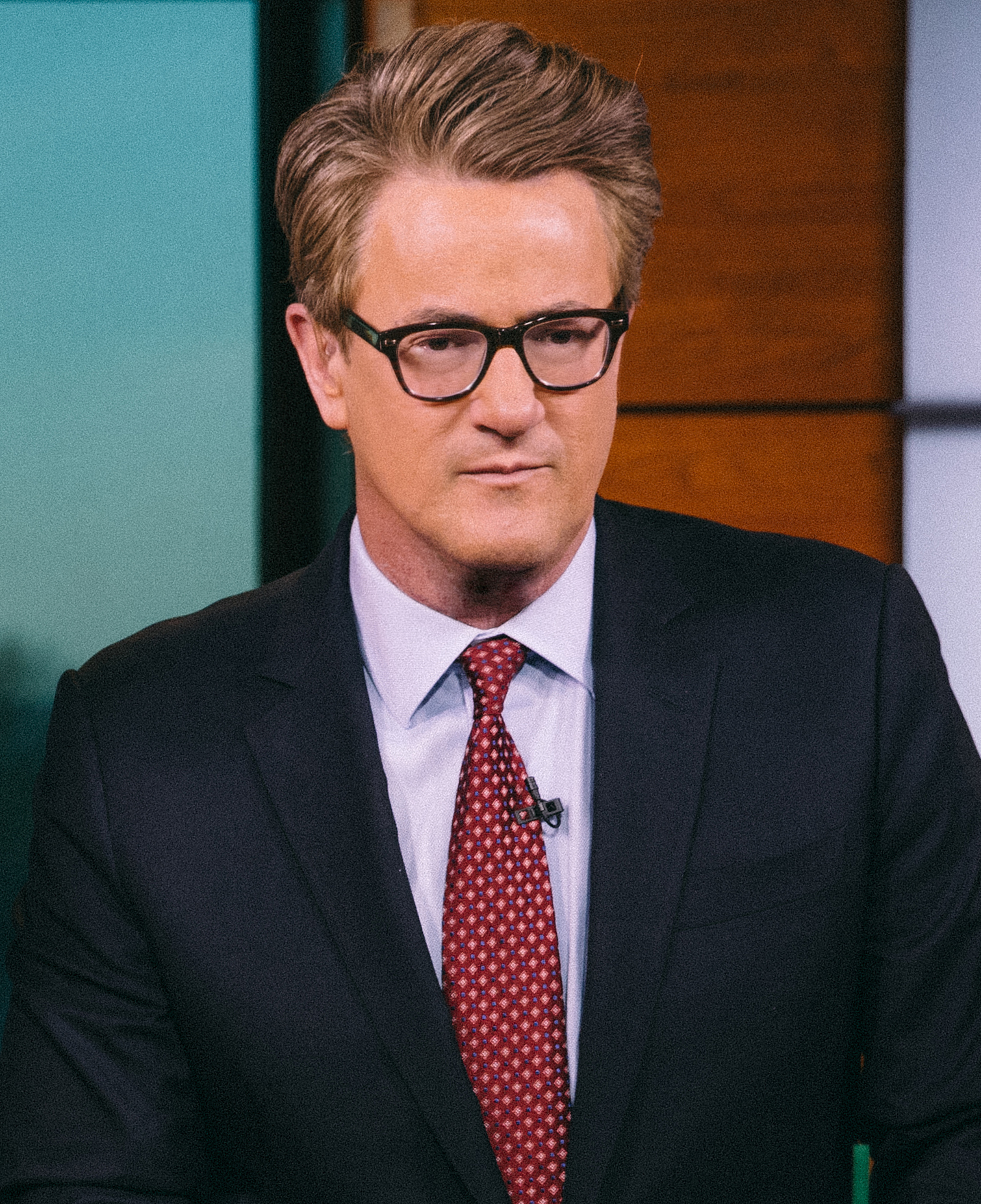
Joe Scarborough

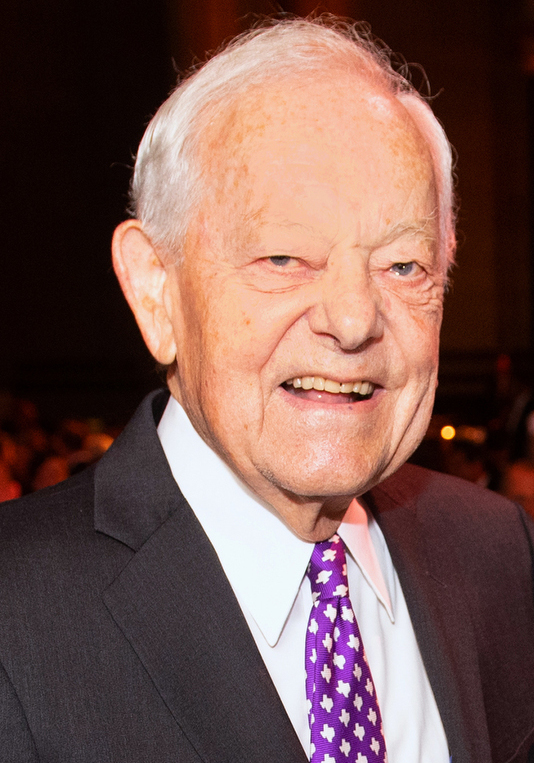
Bob Schieffer

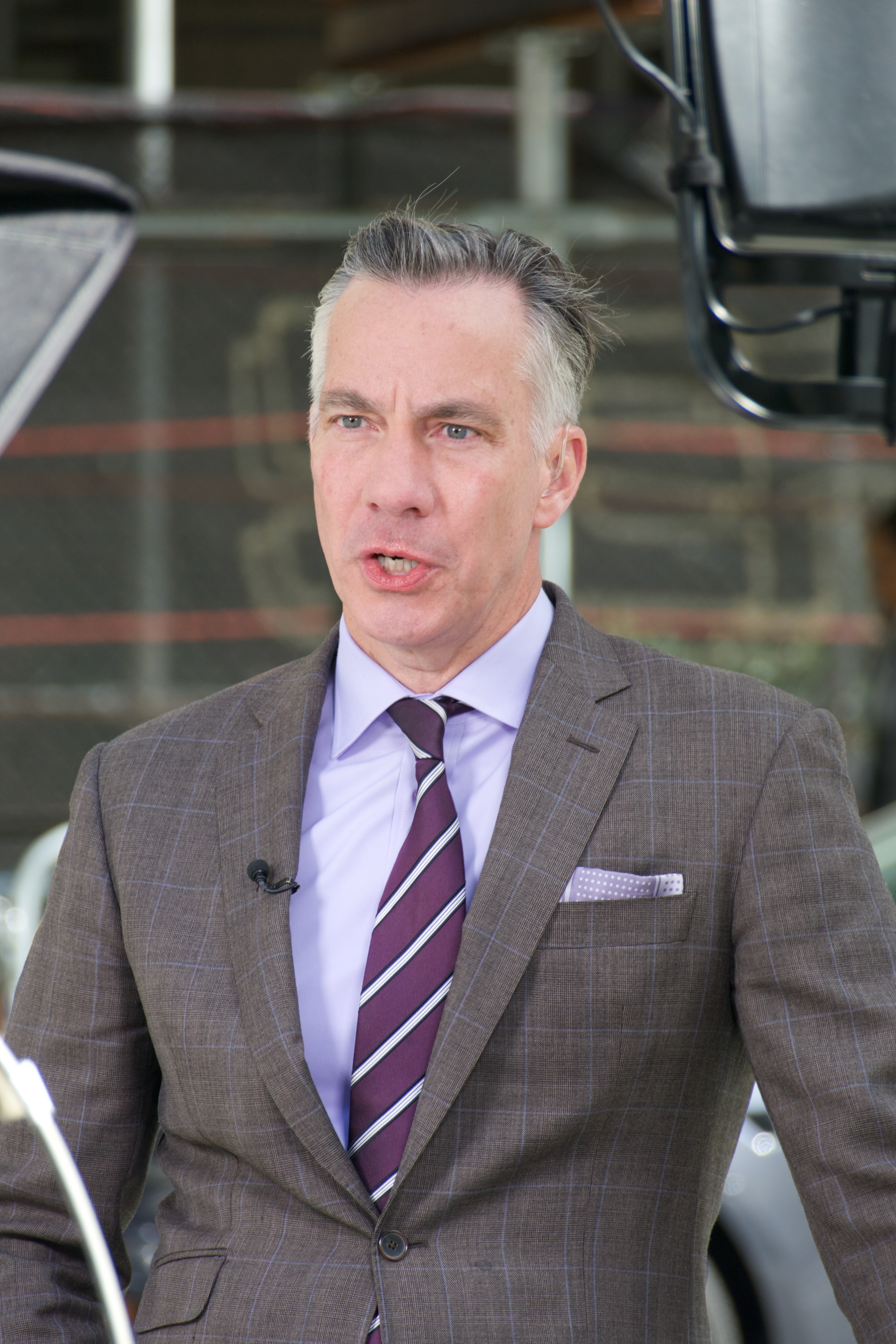
Jim Sciutto

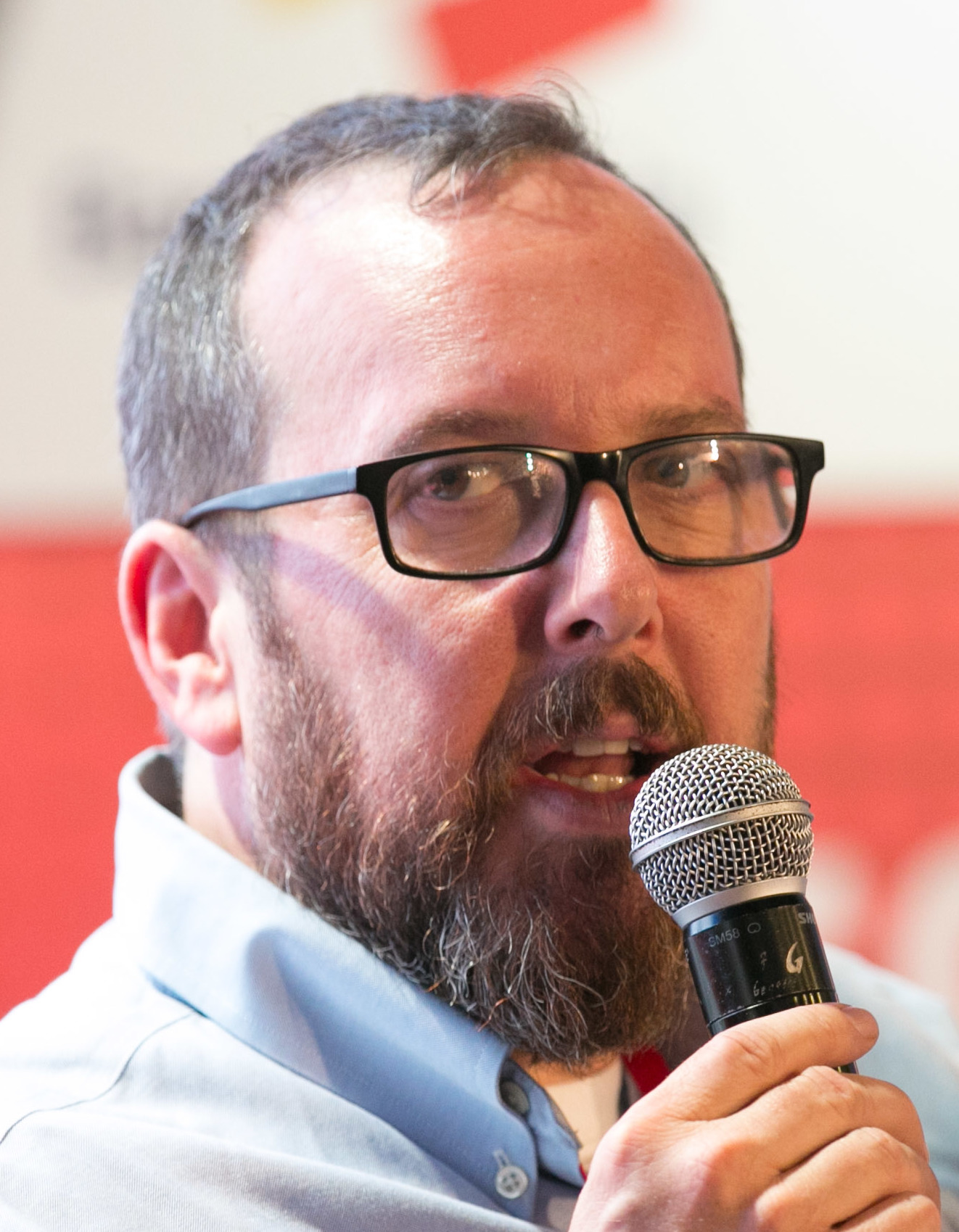
A. O. Scott

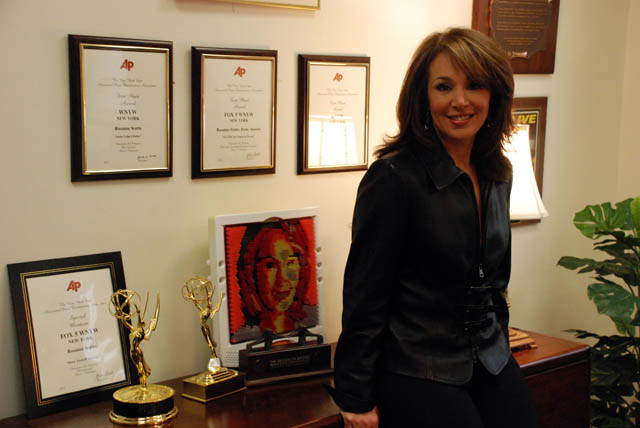
Rosanna Scotto

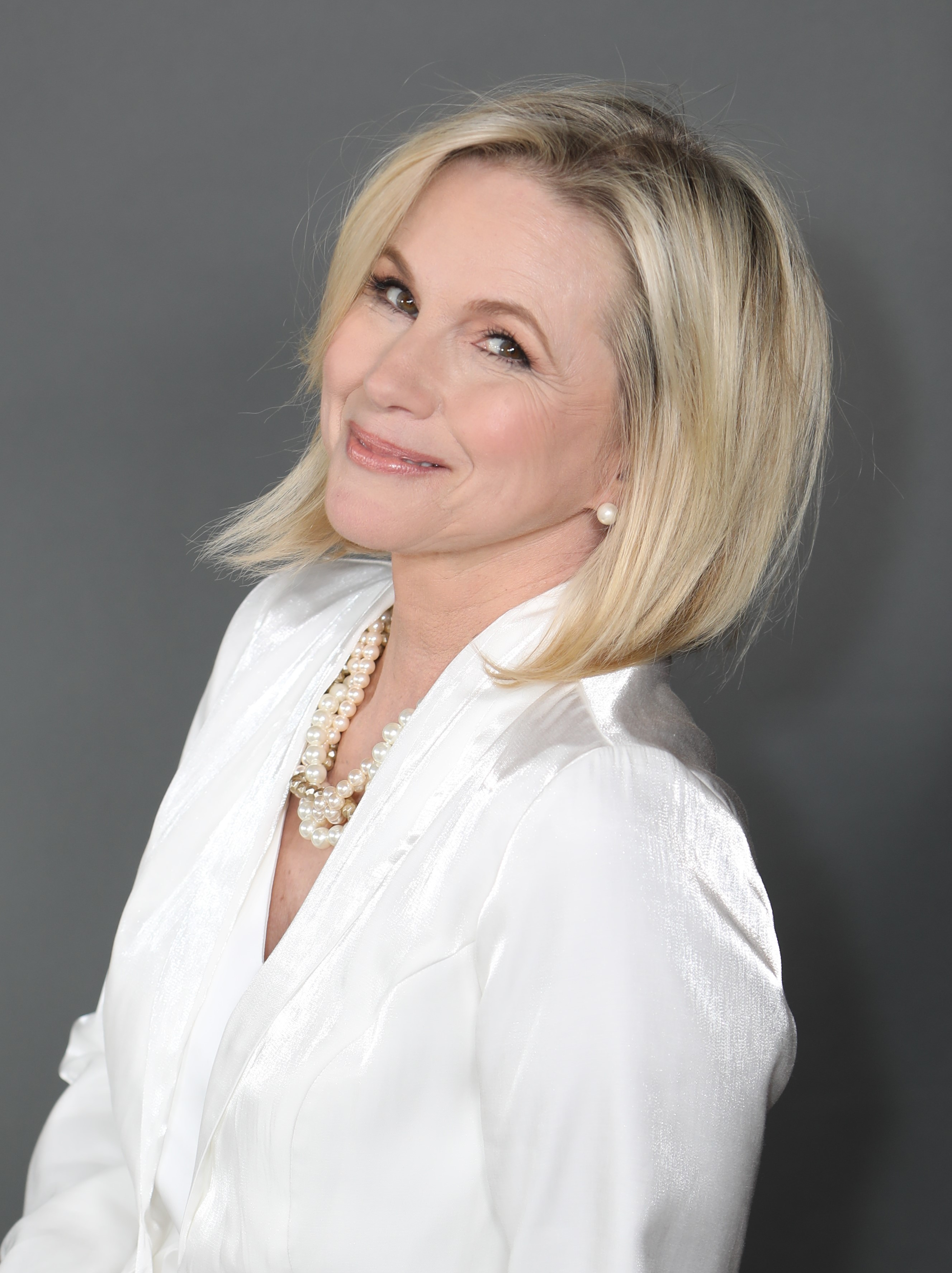
Suzanne Sena

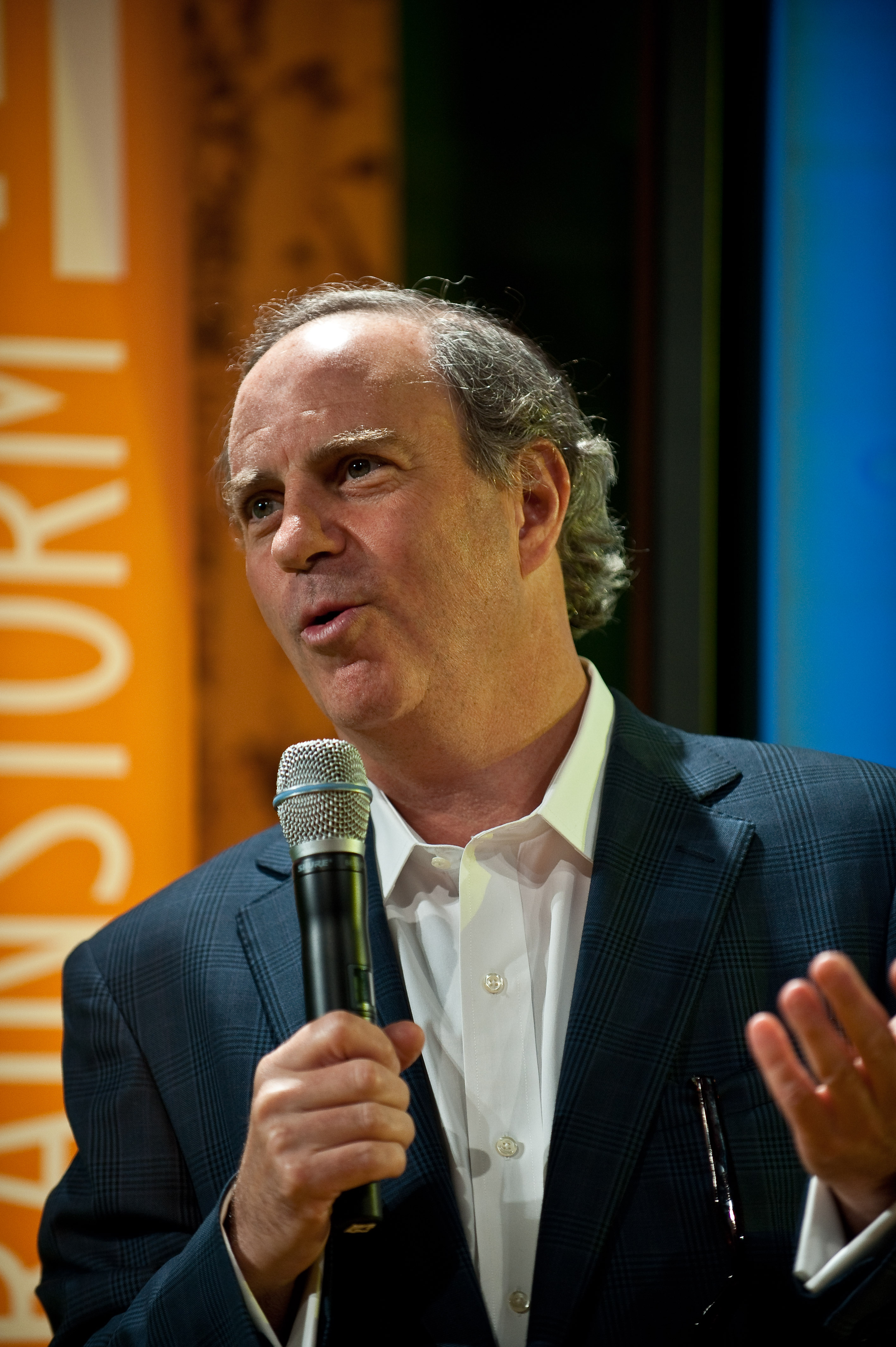
Andrew Serwer

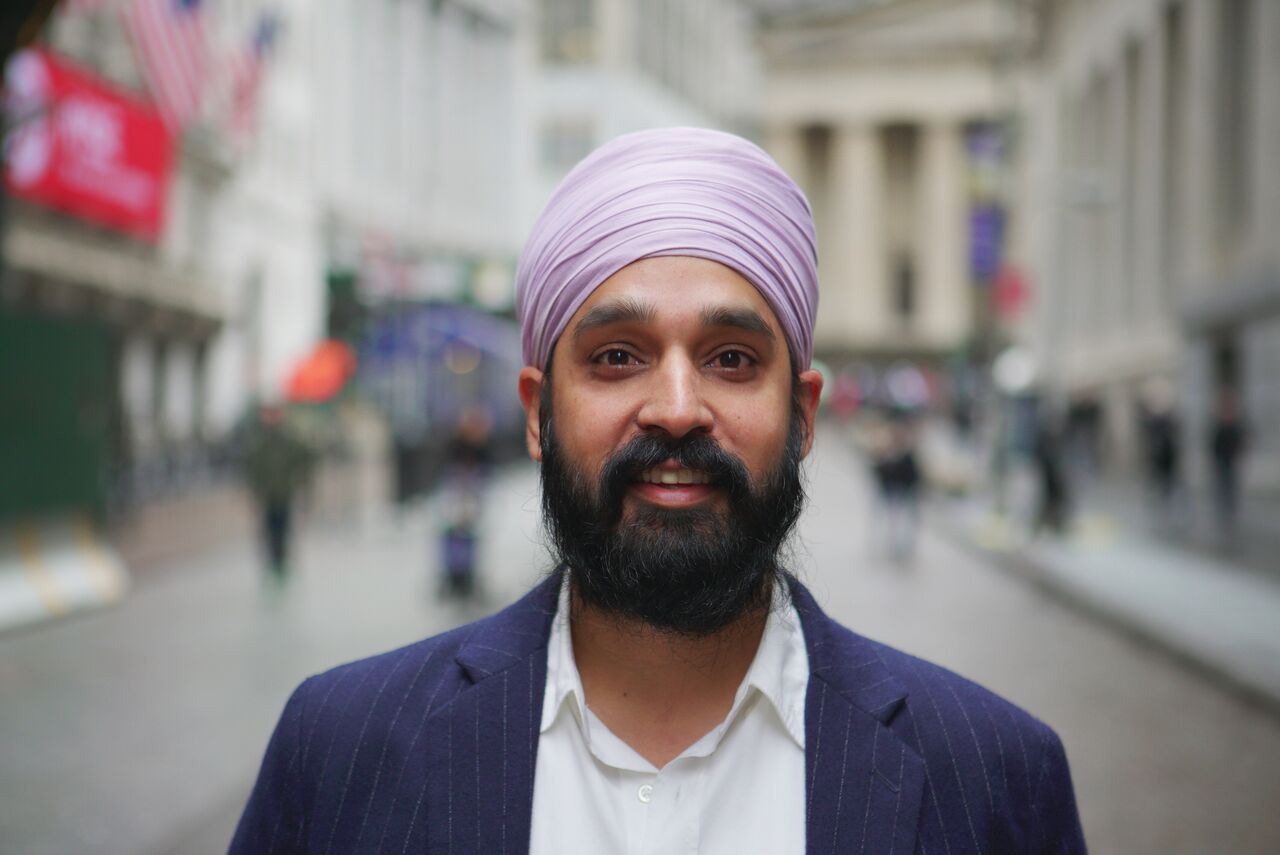
Simran Jeet Singh

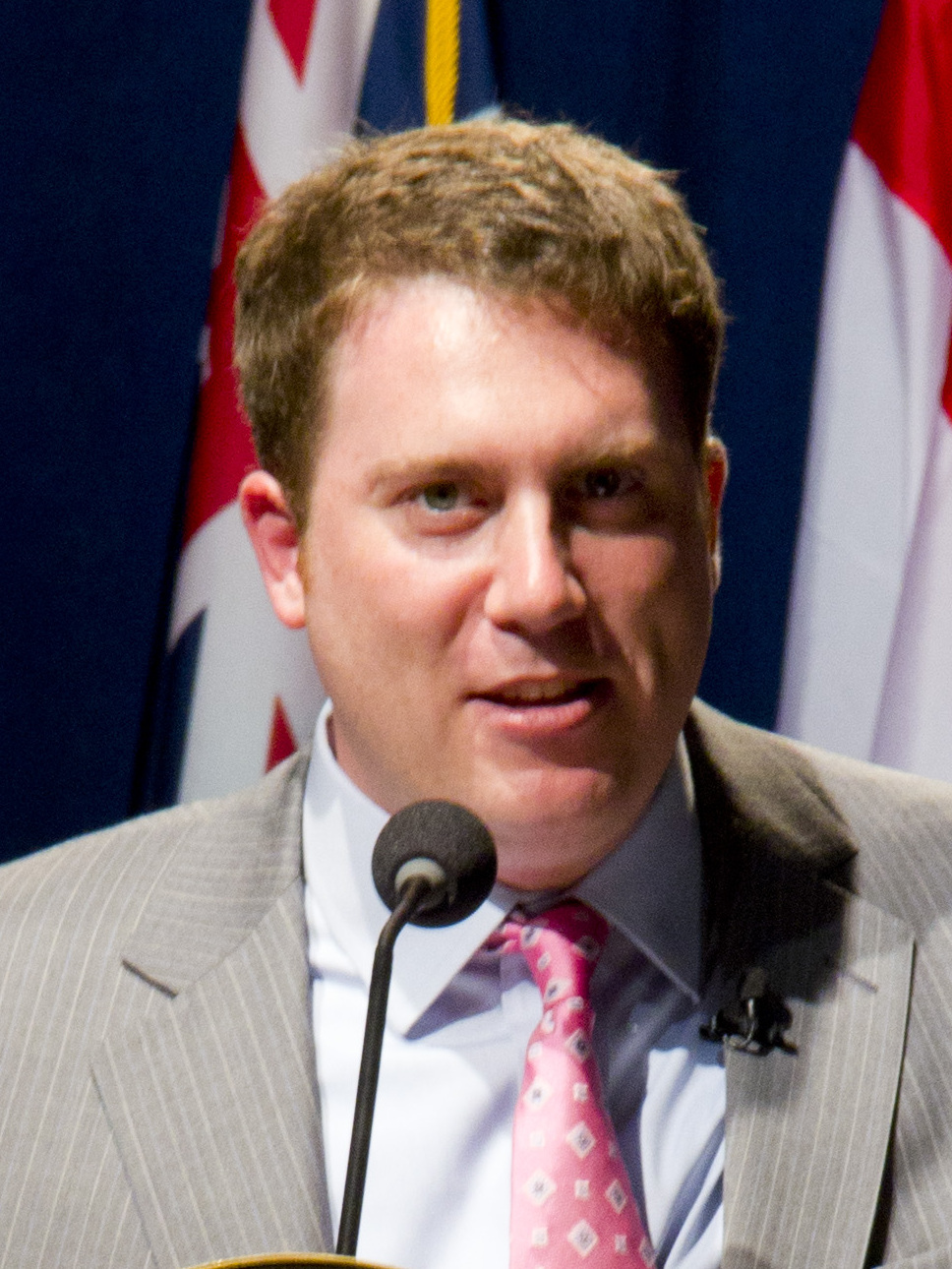
Ben Smith

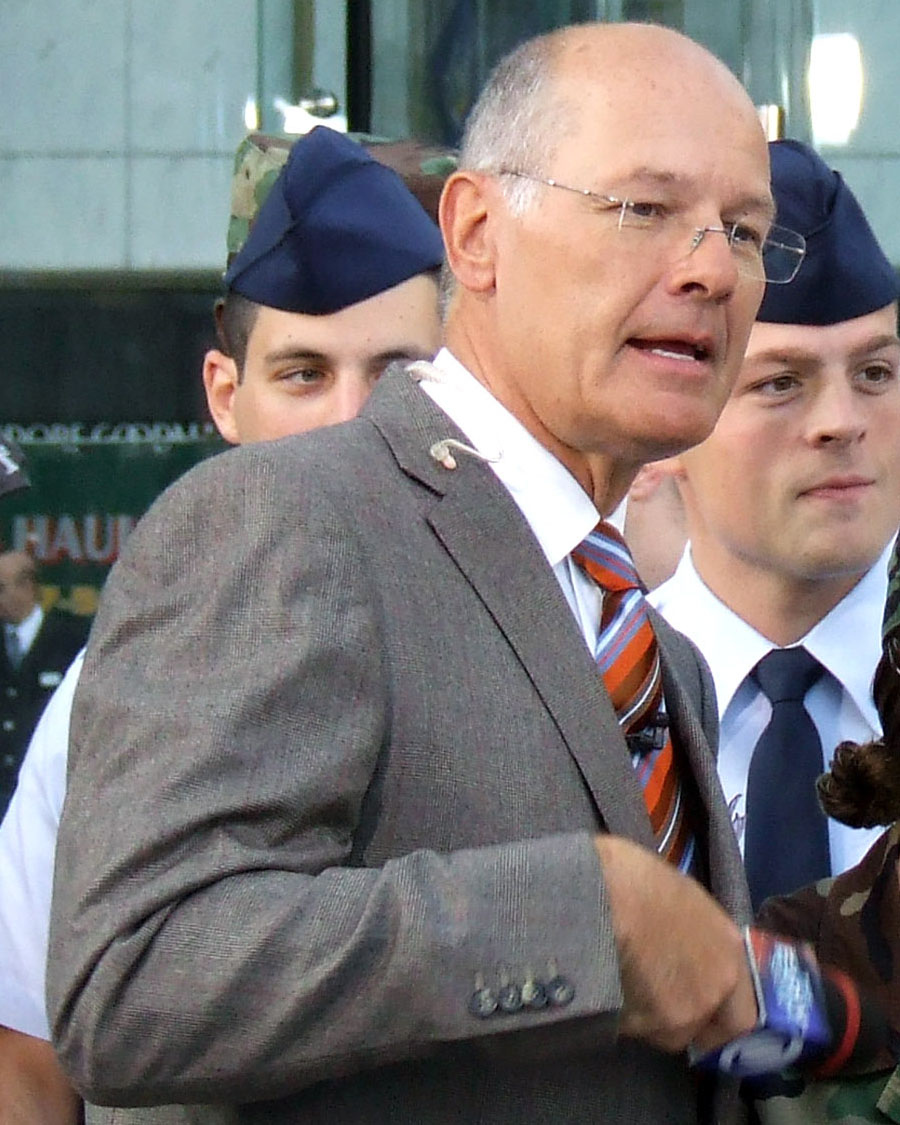
Harry Smith

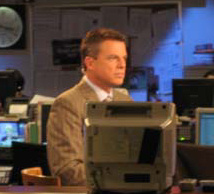
Shepard Smith

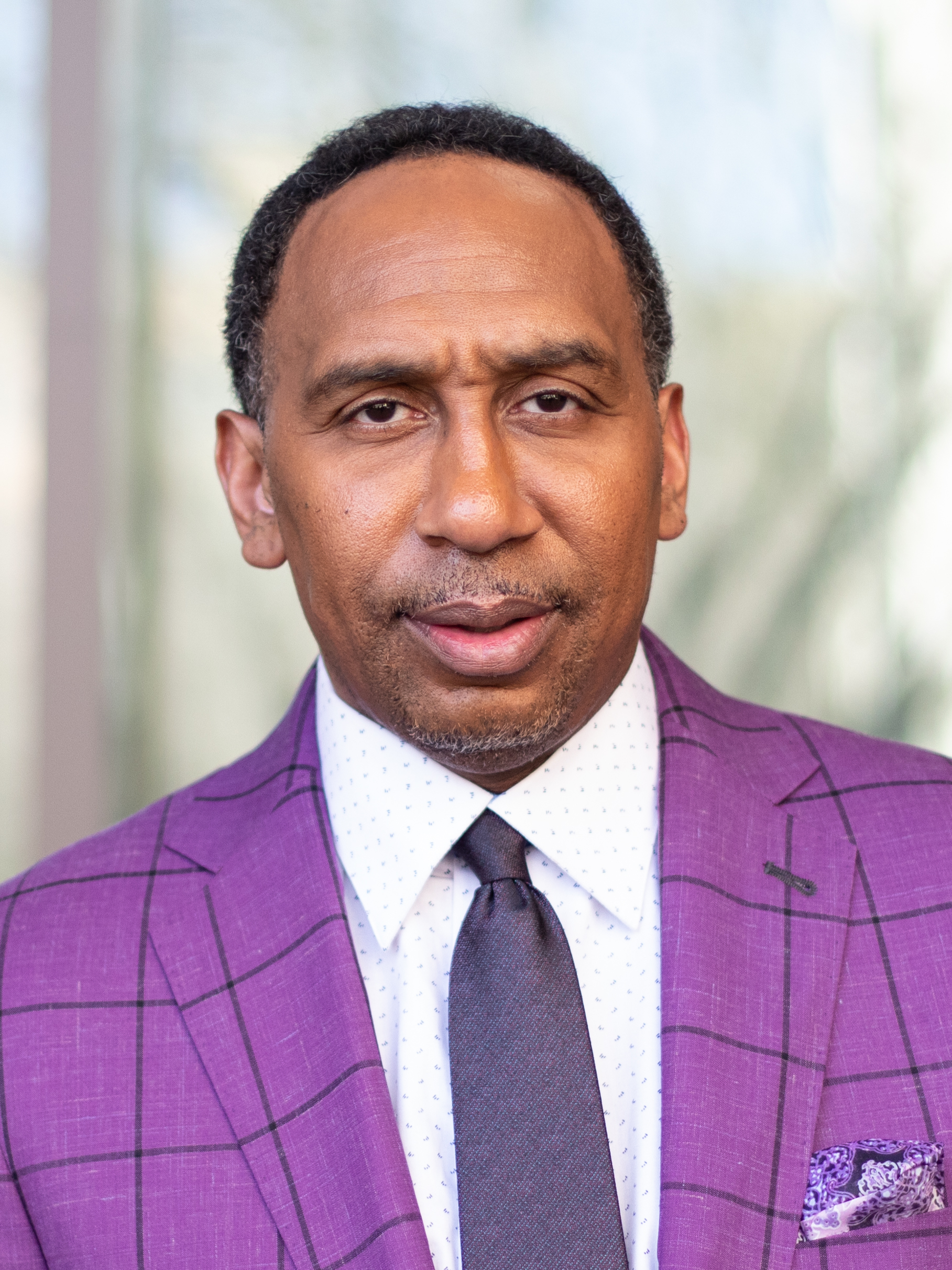
Stephen A. Smith

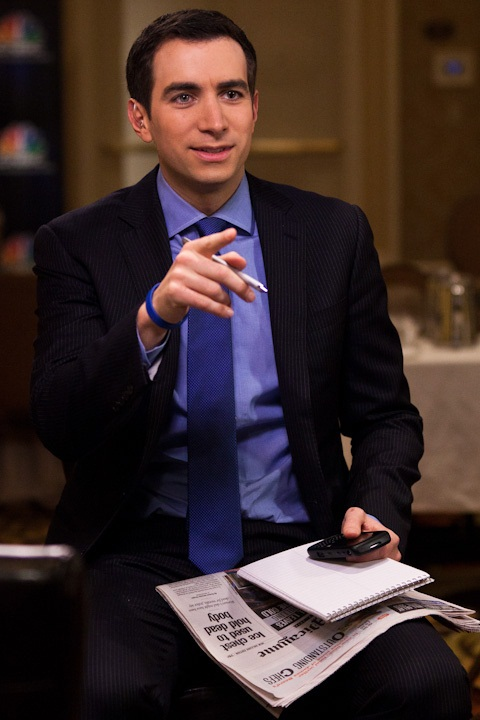
Andrew Ross Sorkin

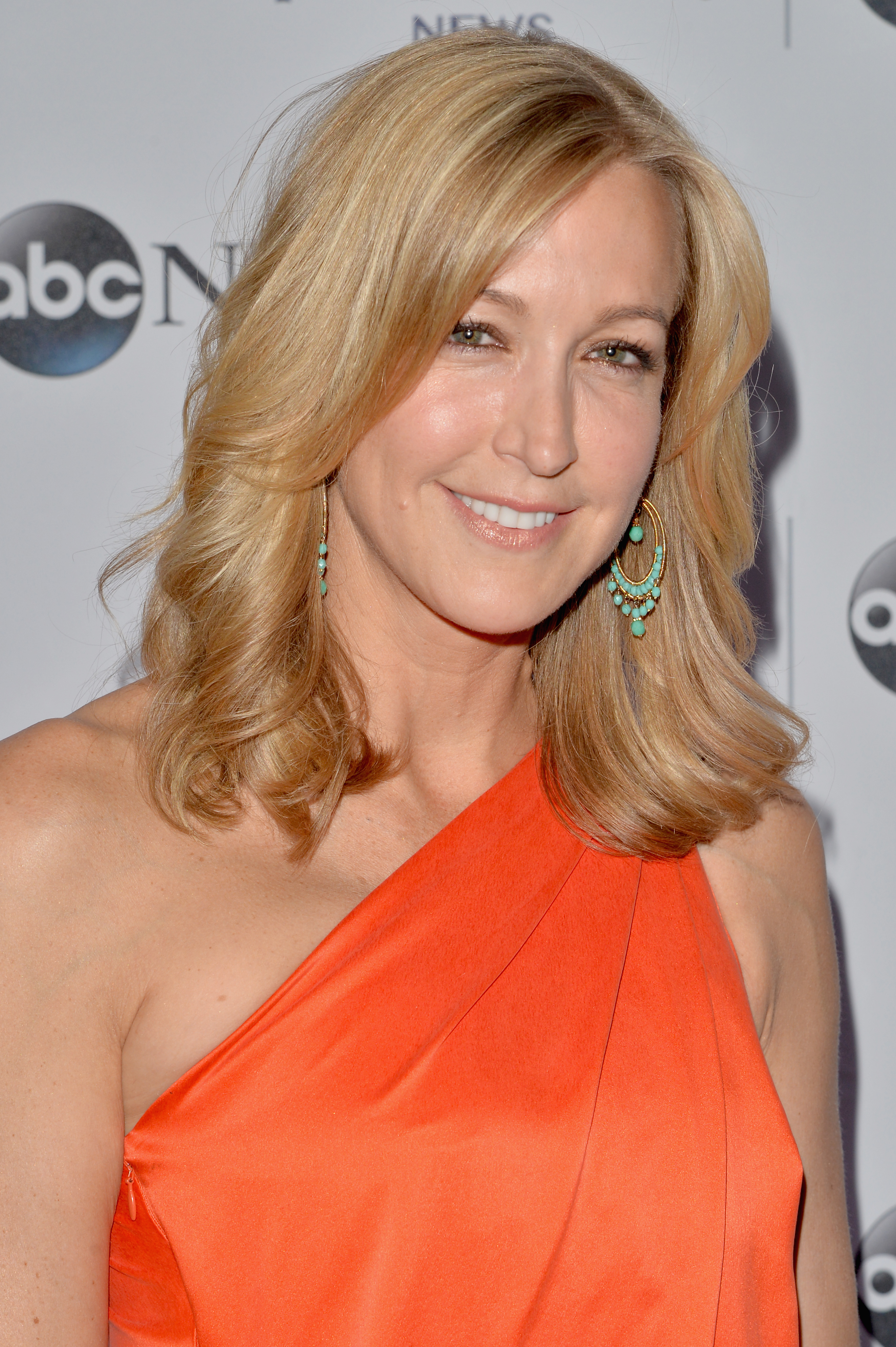
Lara Spencer

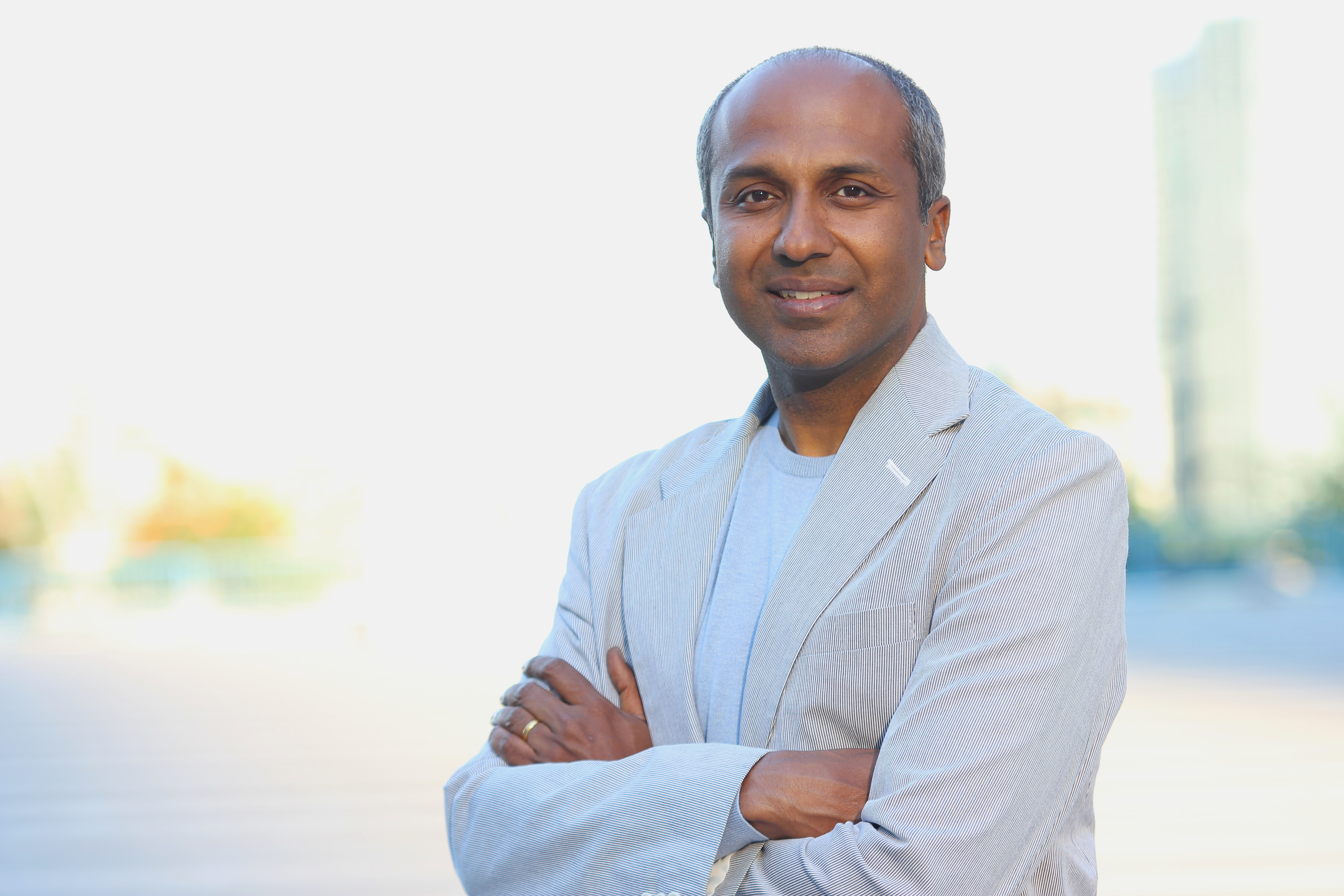
Sreenath Sreenivasan

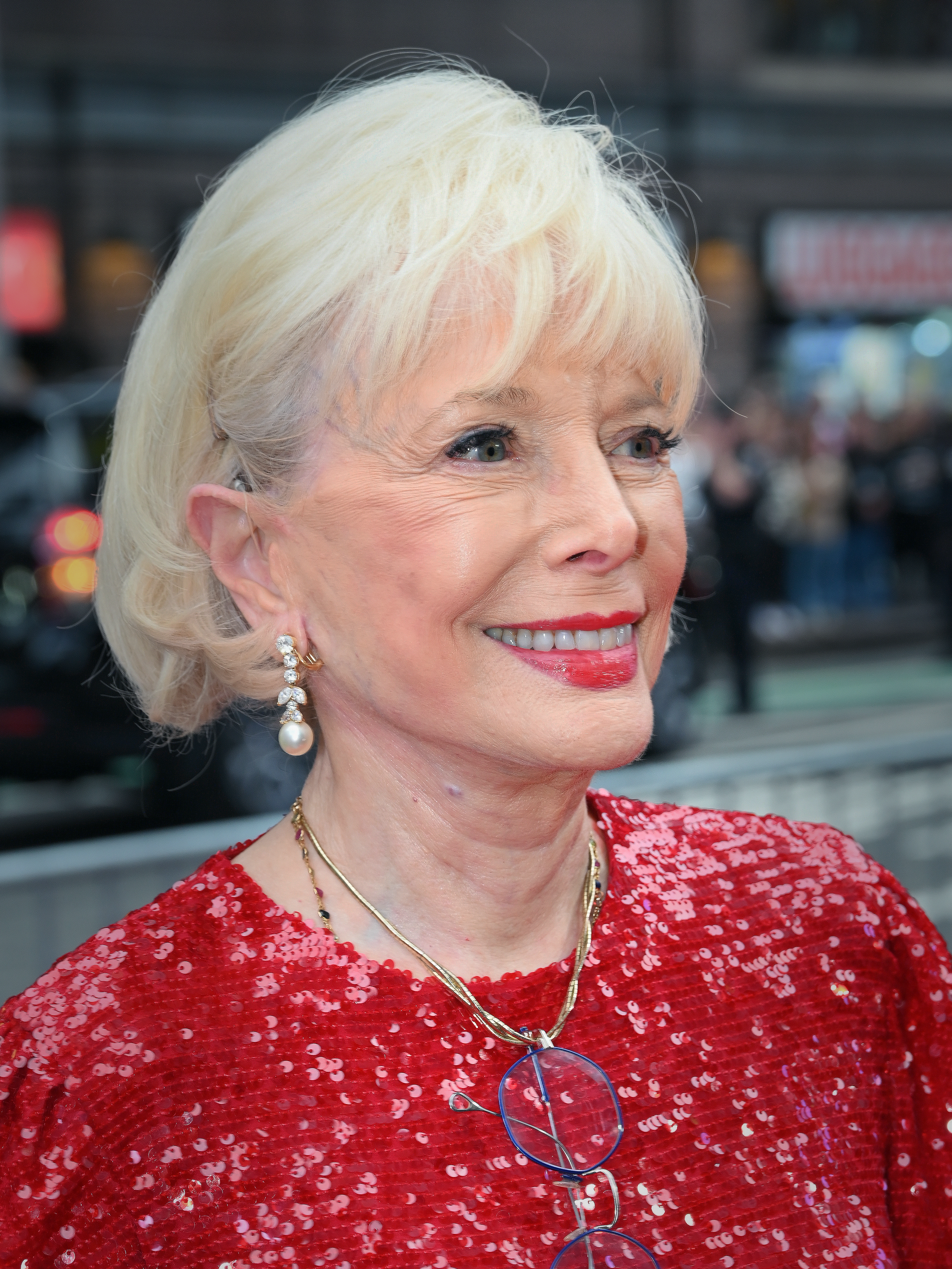
Lesley Stahl

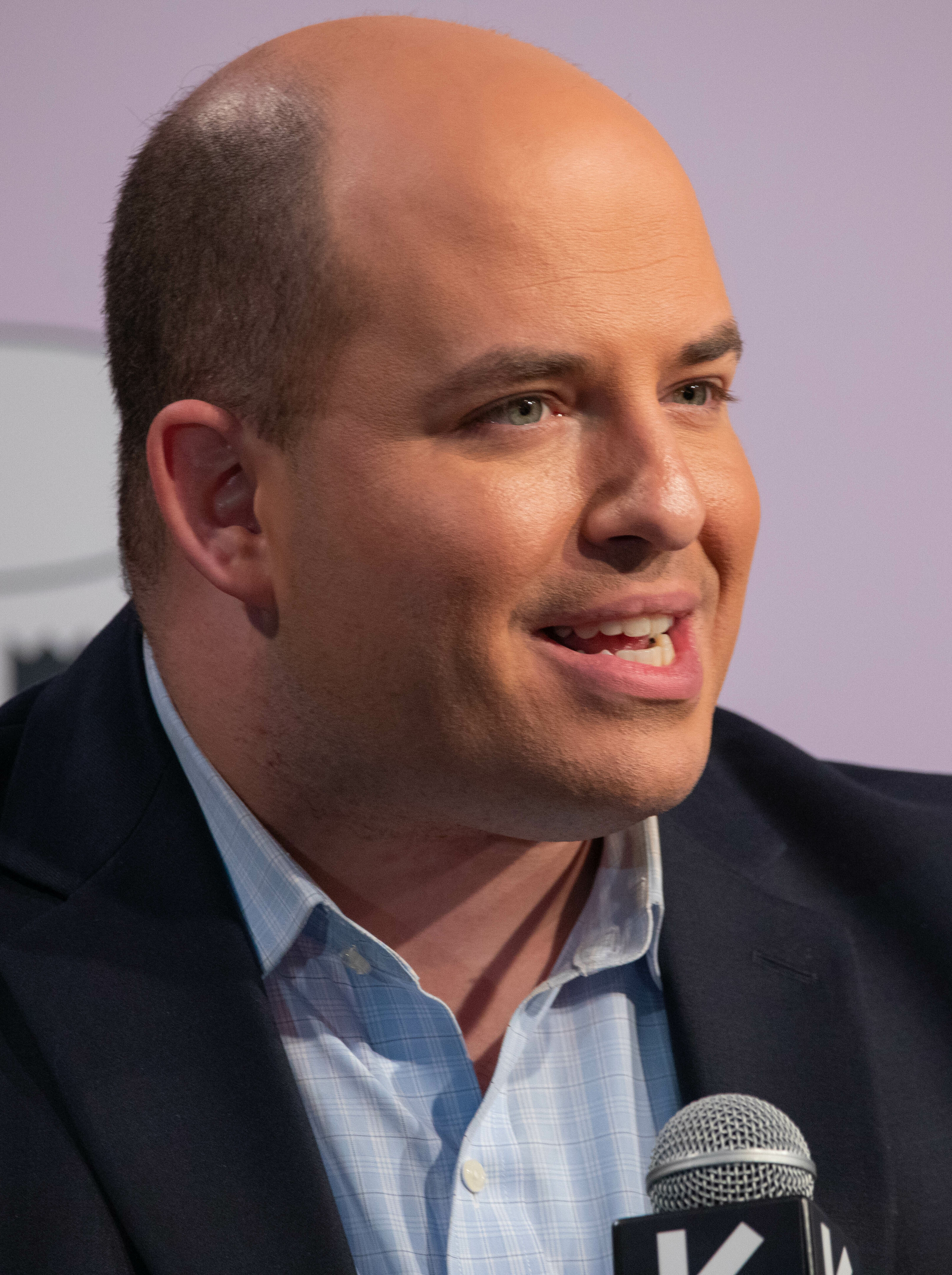
Brian Stelter

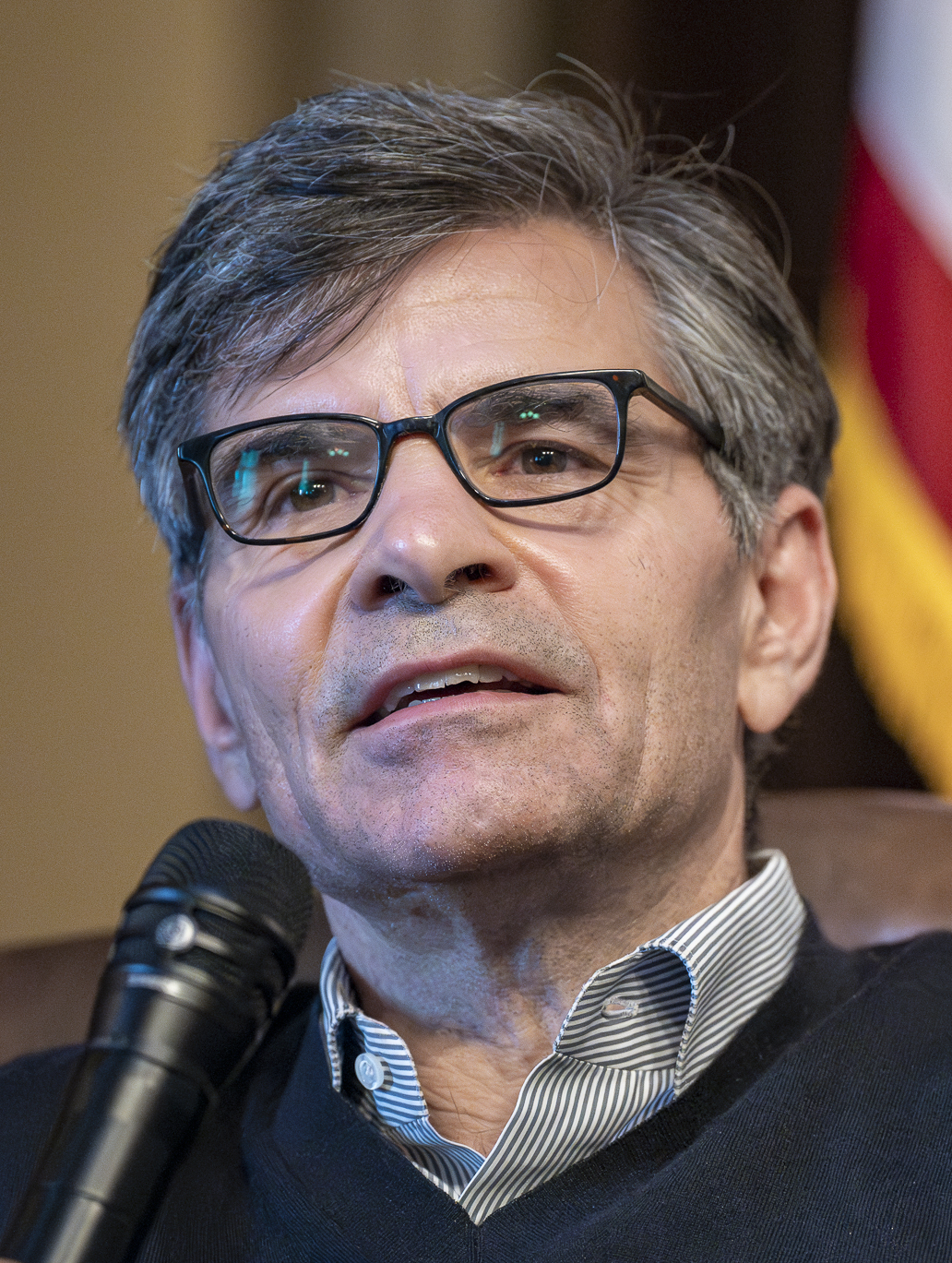
George Stephanopoulos

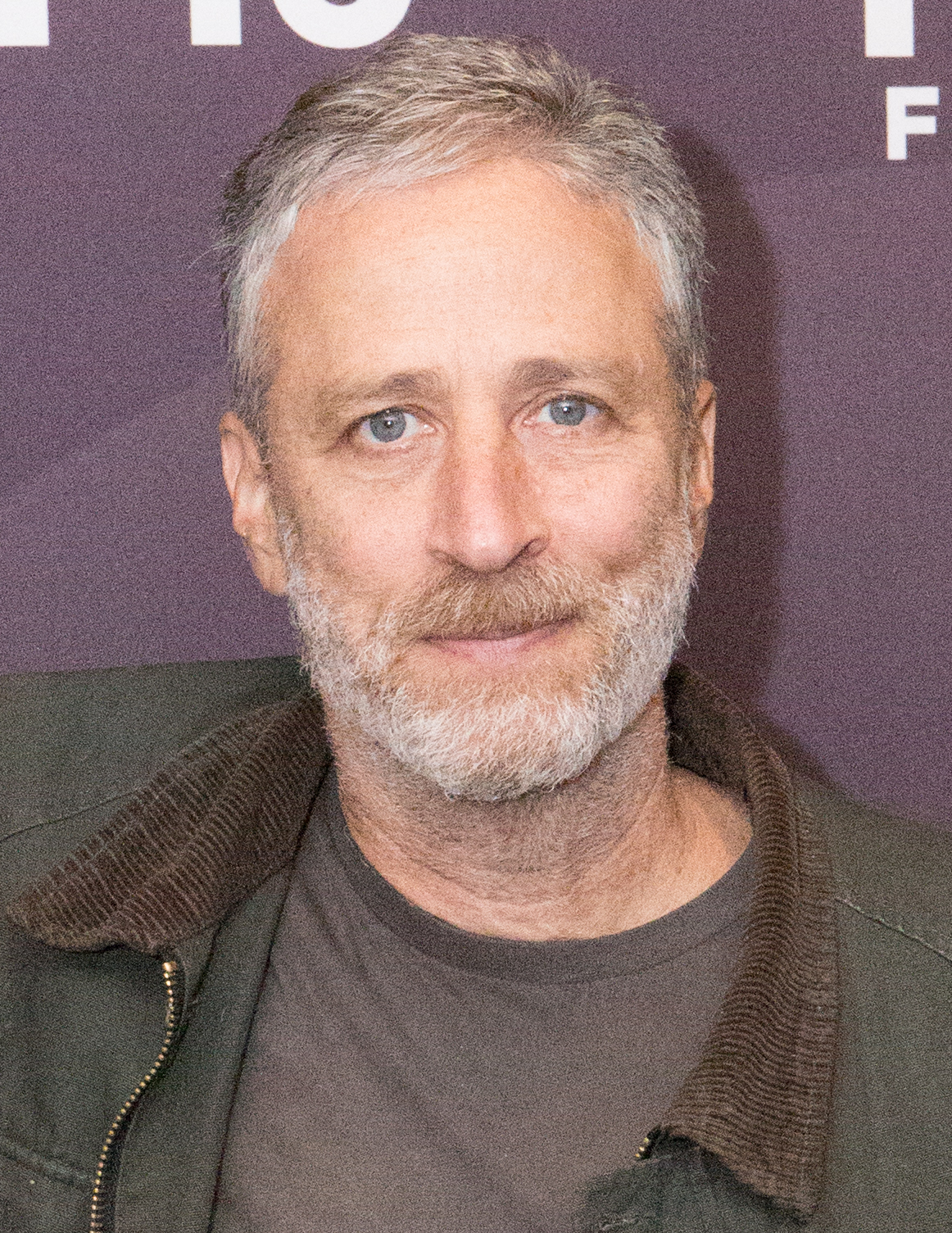
Jon Stewart

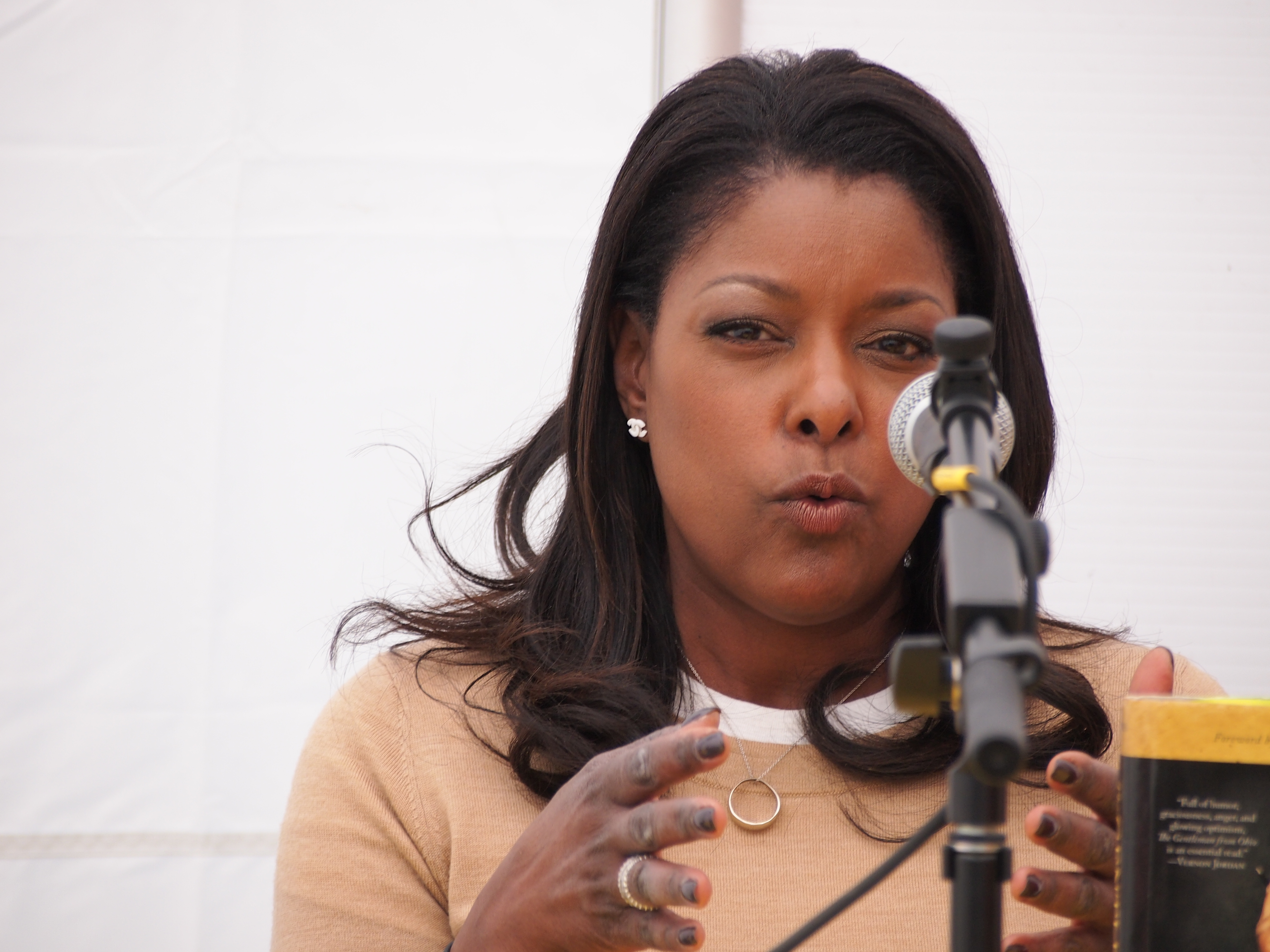
Lori Stokes

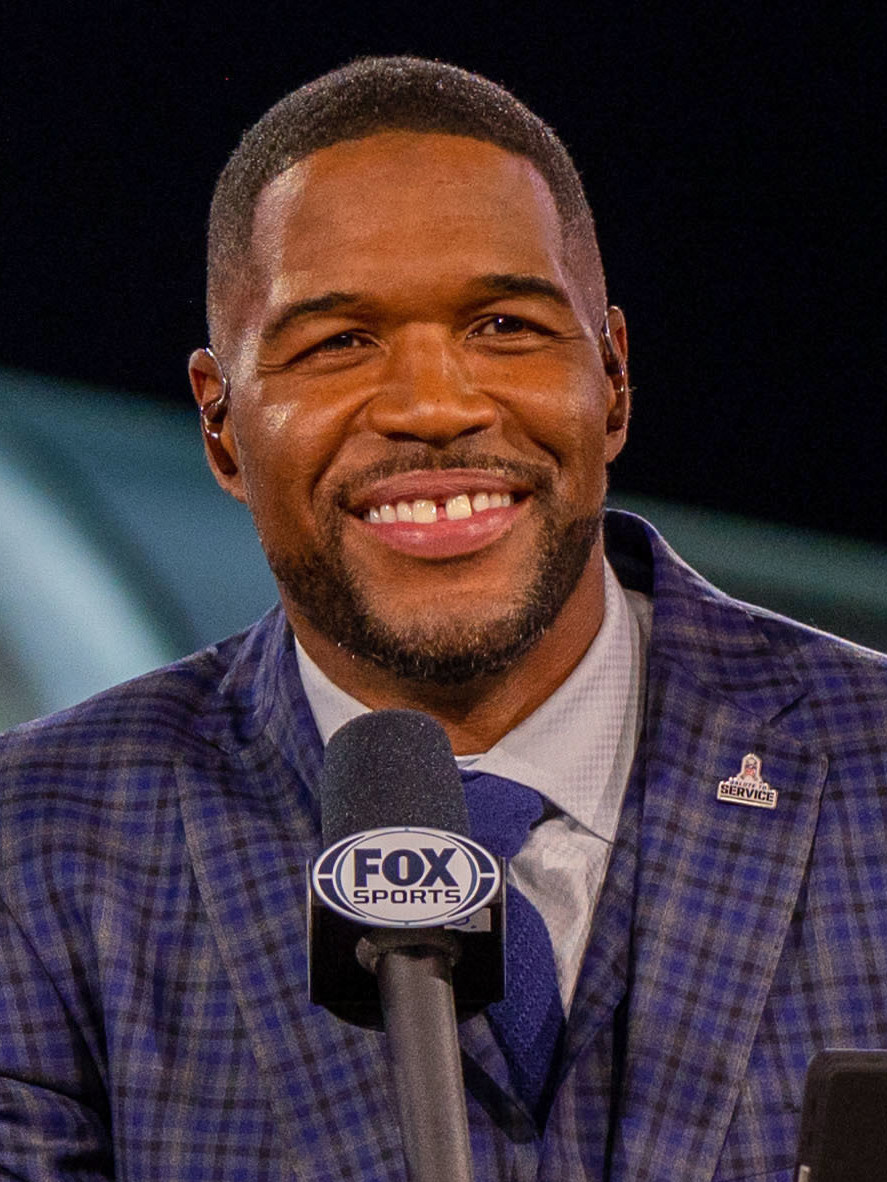
Michael Strahan

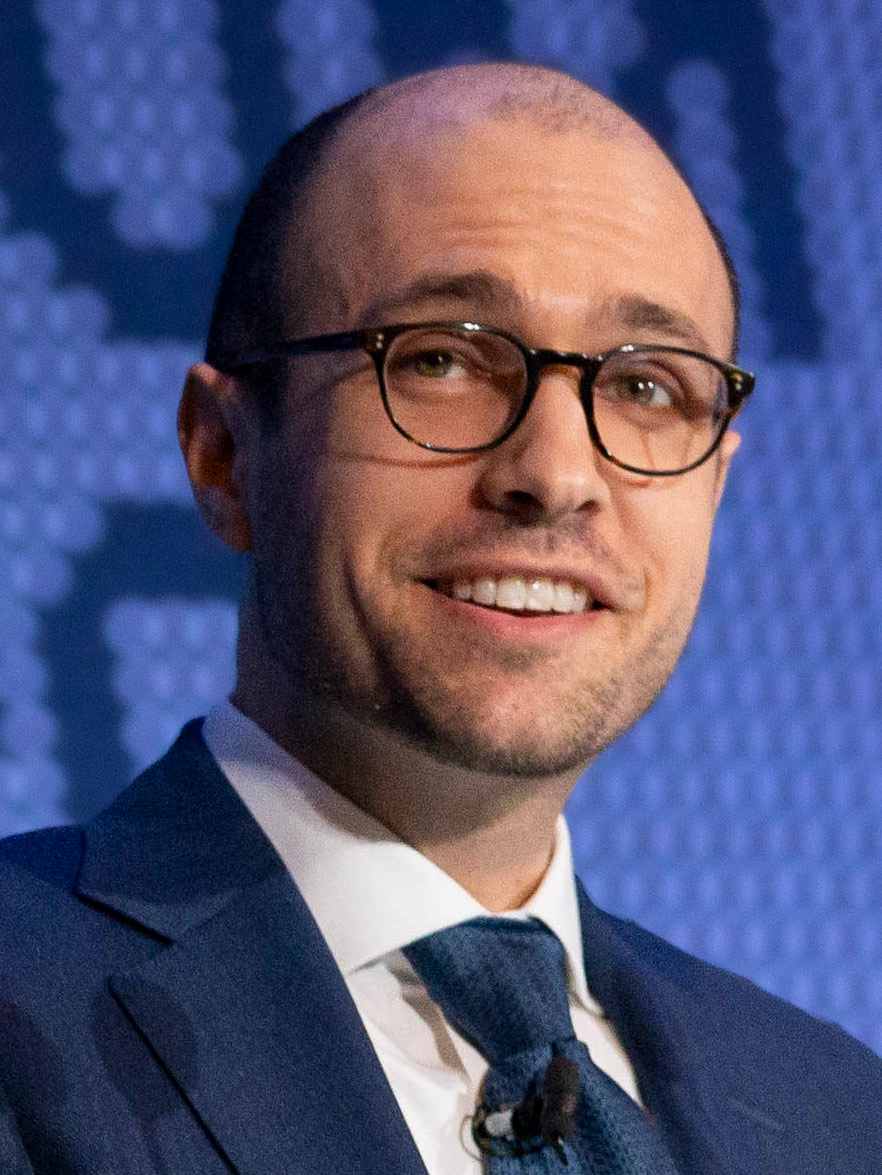
A. G. Sulzberger

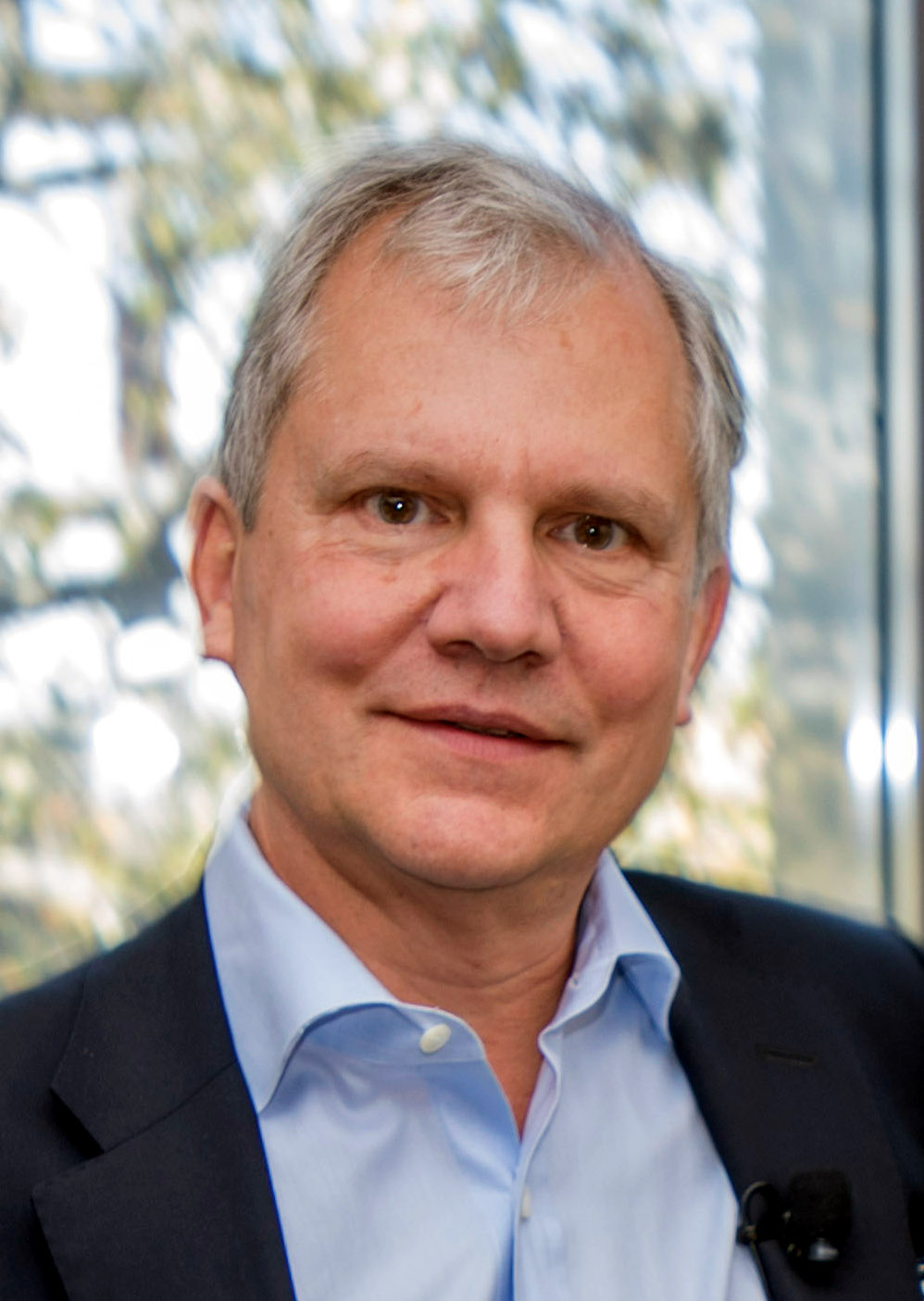
Arthur Ochs Sulzberger Jr.

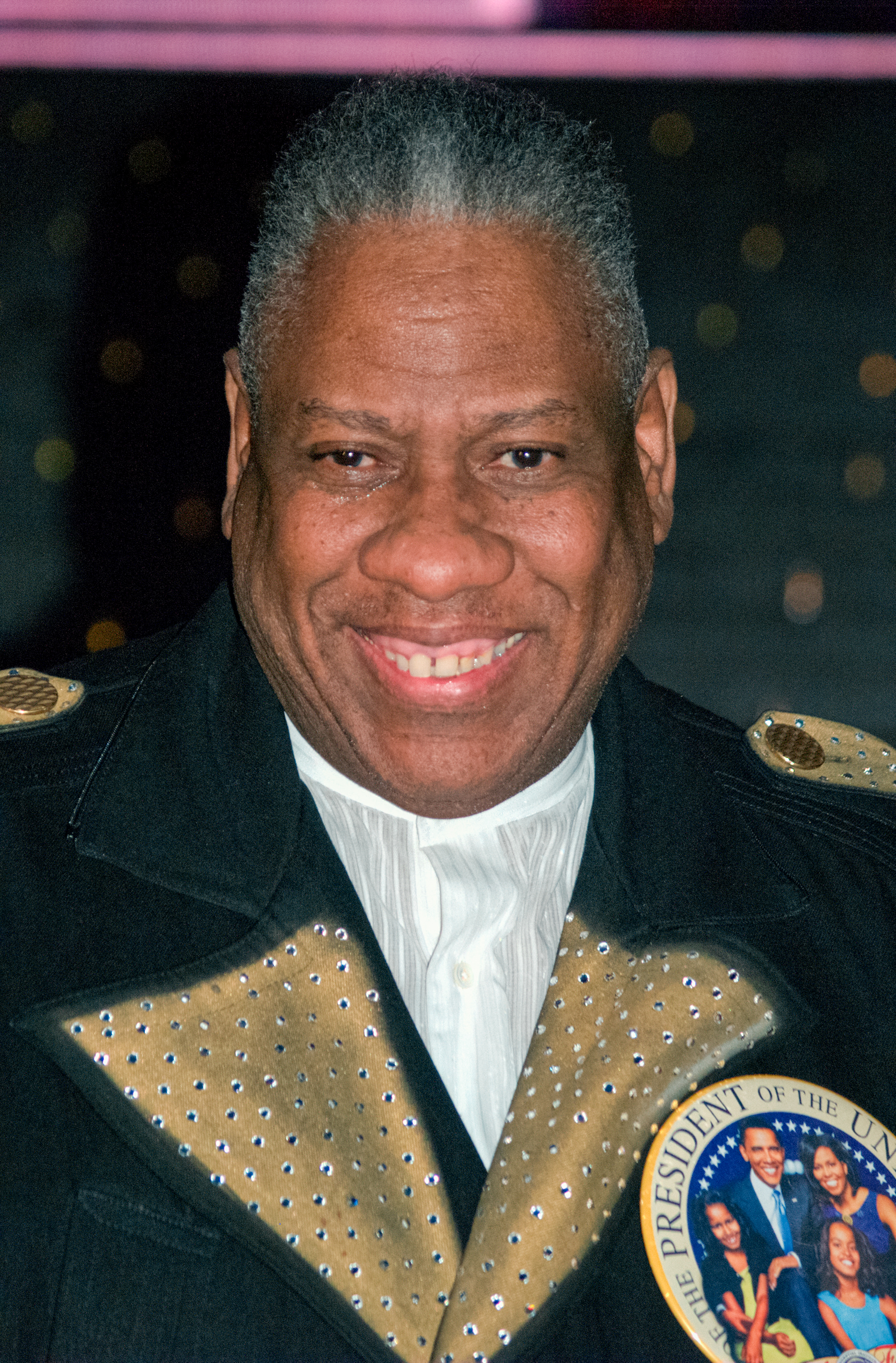
André Leon Talley

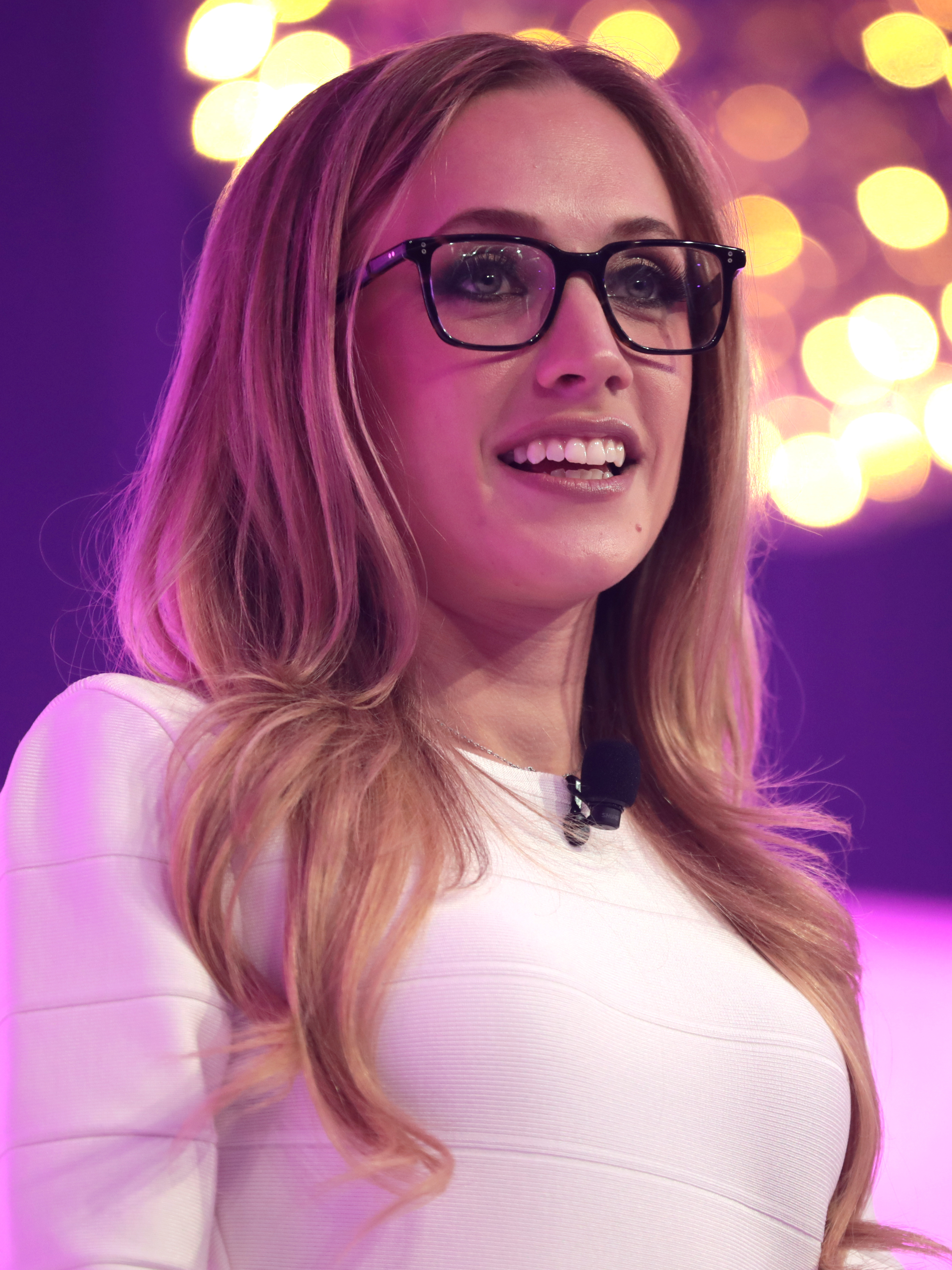
Kat Timpf

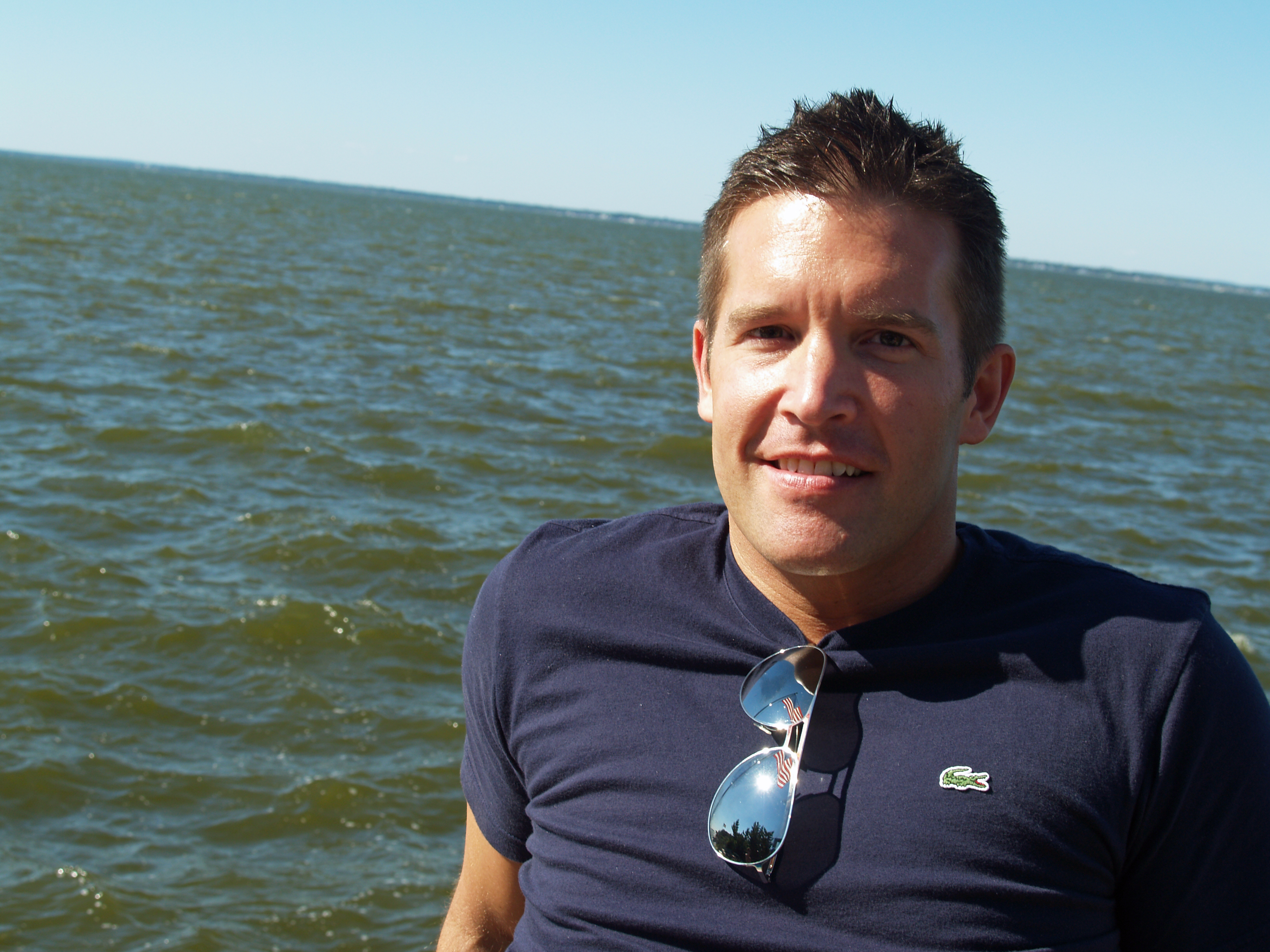
Andy Towle

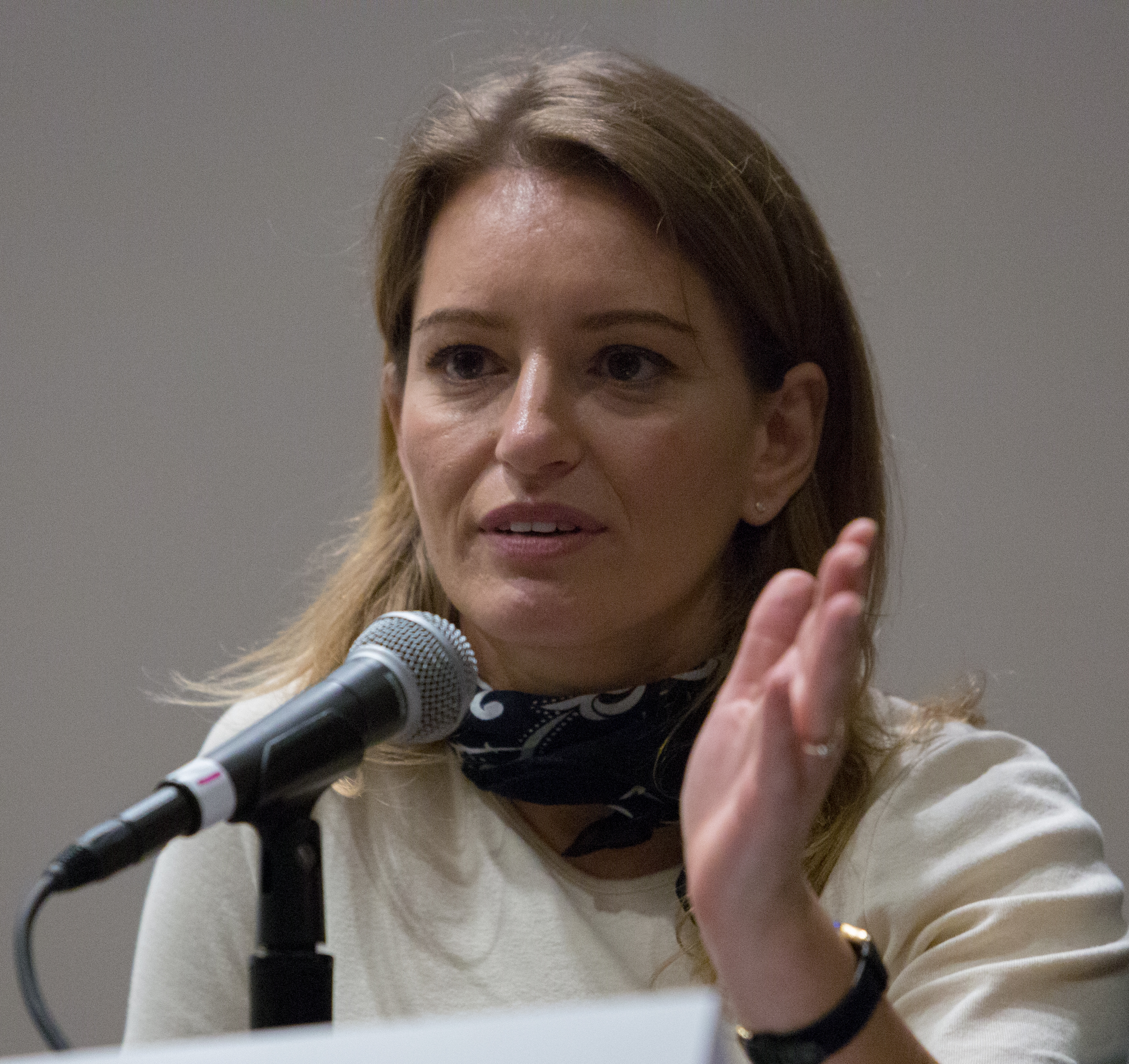
Katy Tur

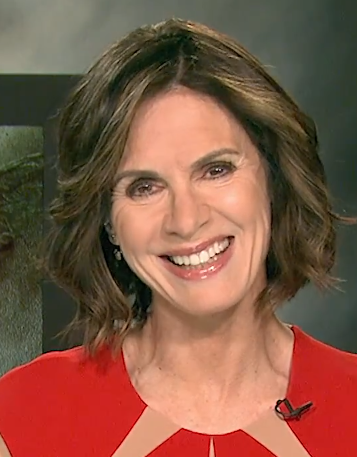
Elizabeth Vargas

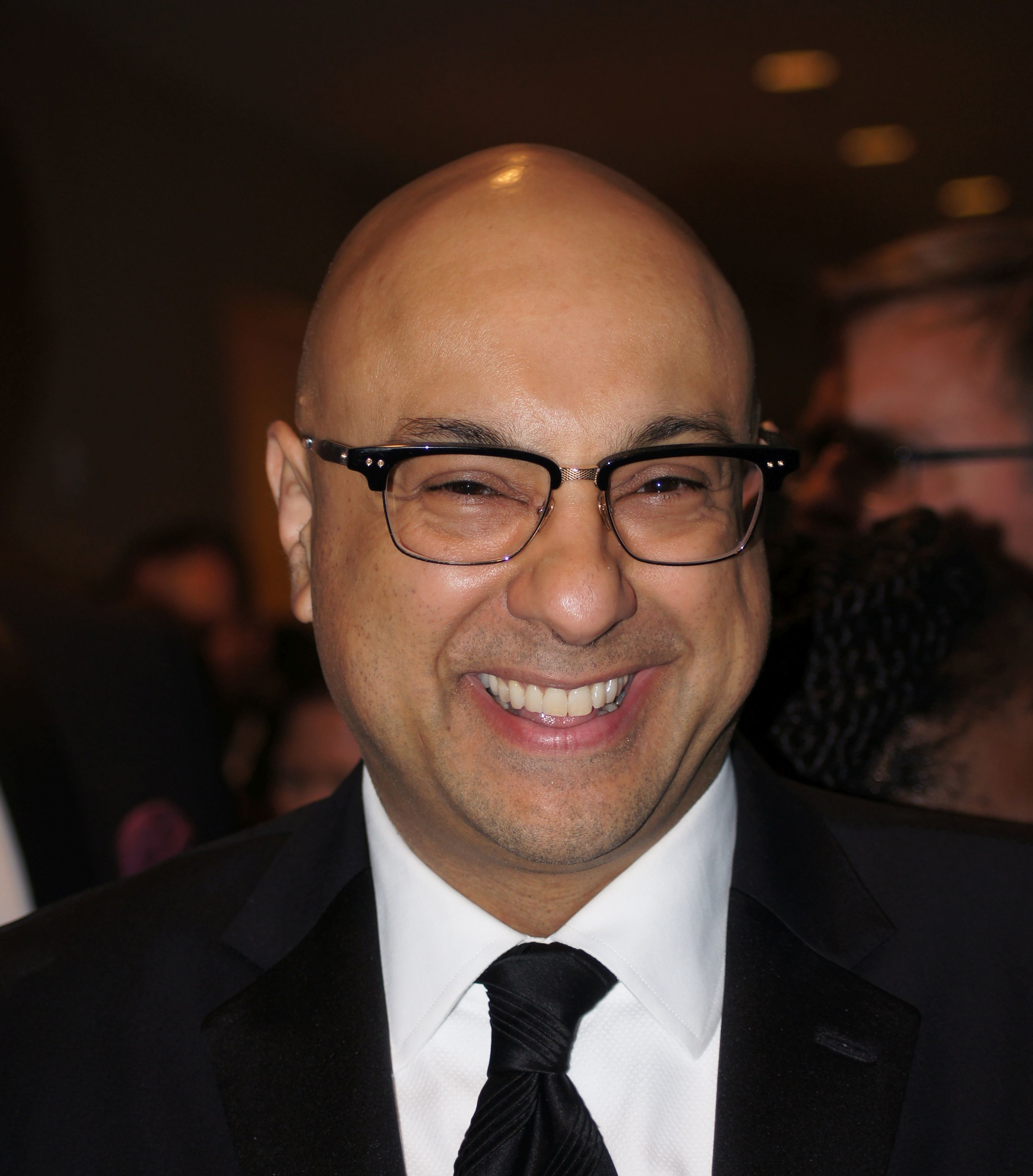
Ali Velshi

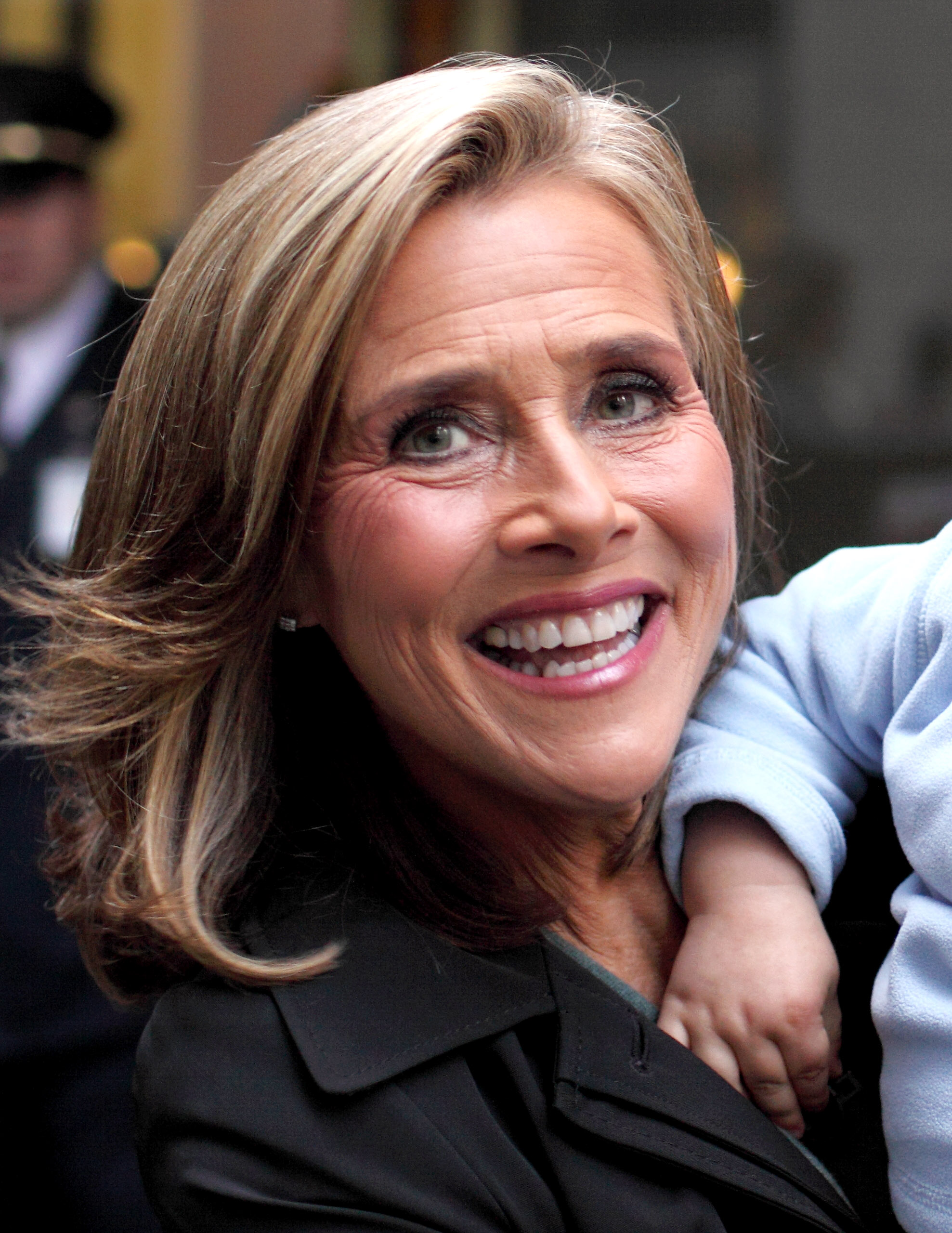
Meredith Vieira

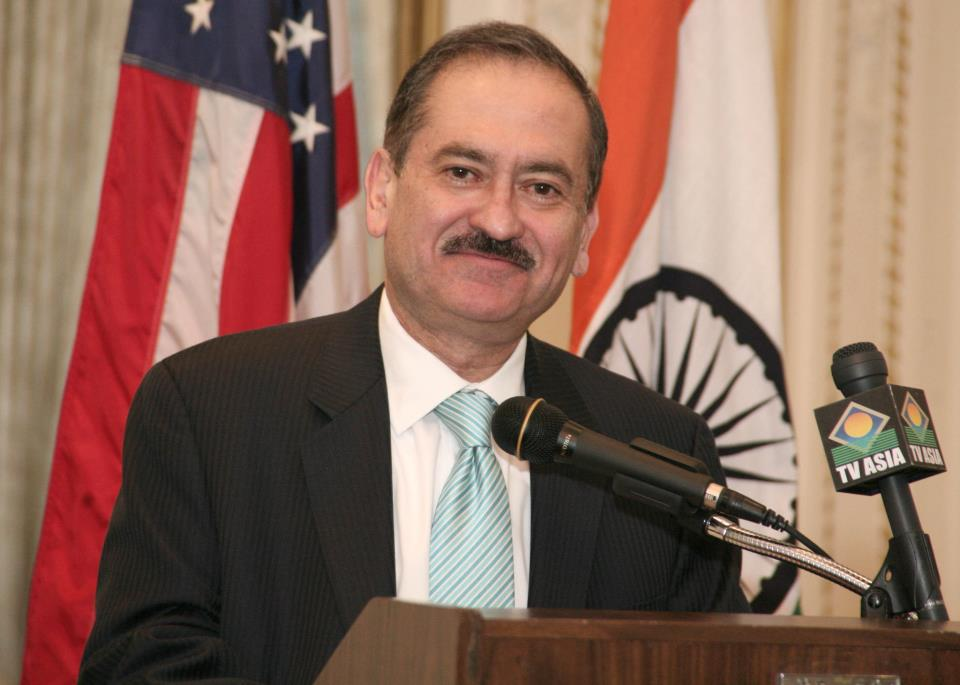
Rohit Vyas

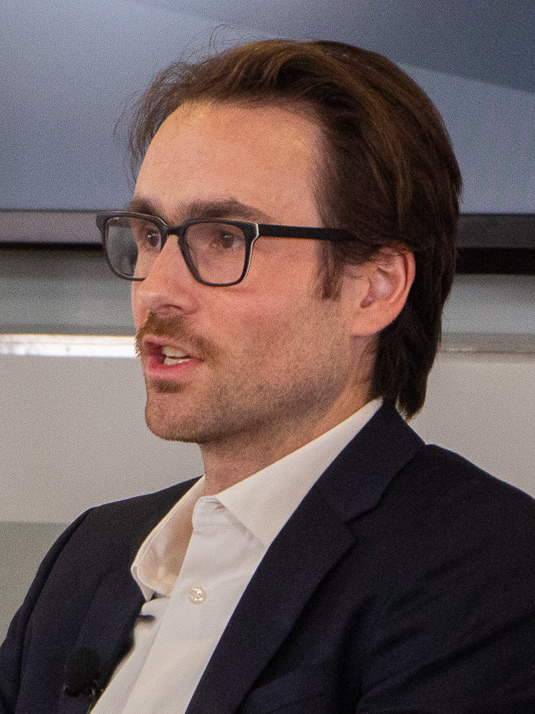
David Wallace-Wells

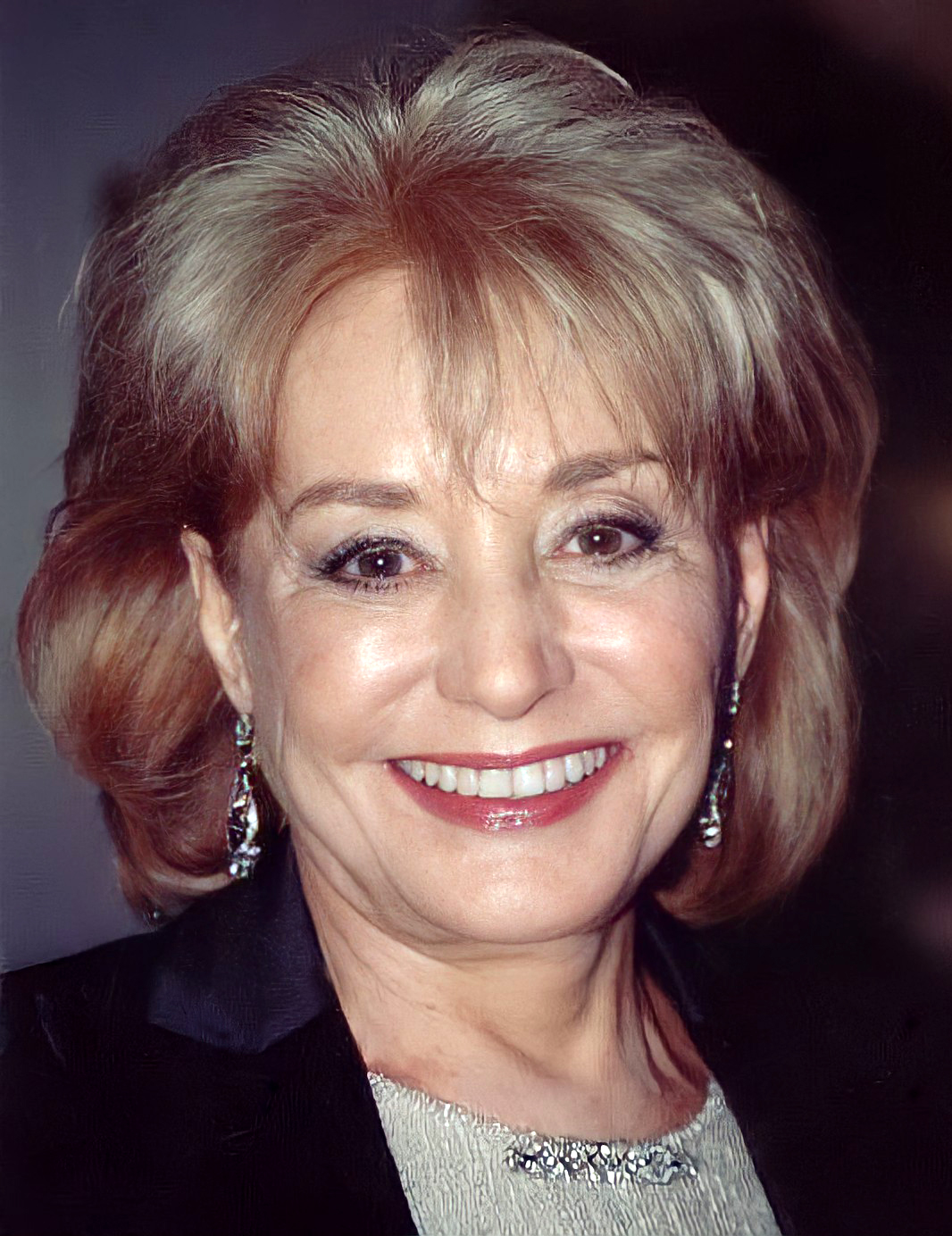
Barbara Walters

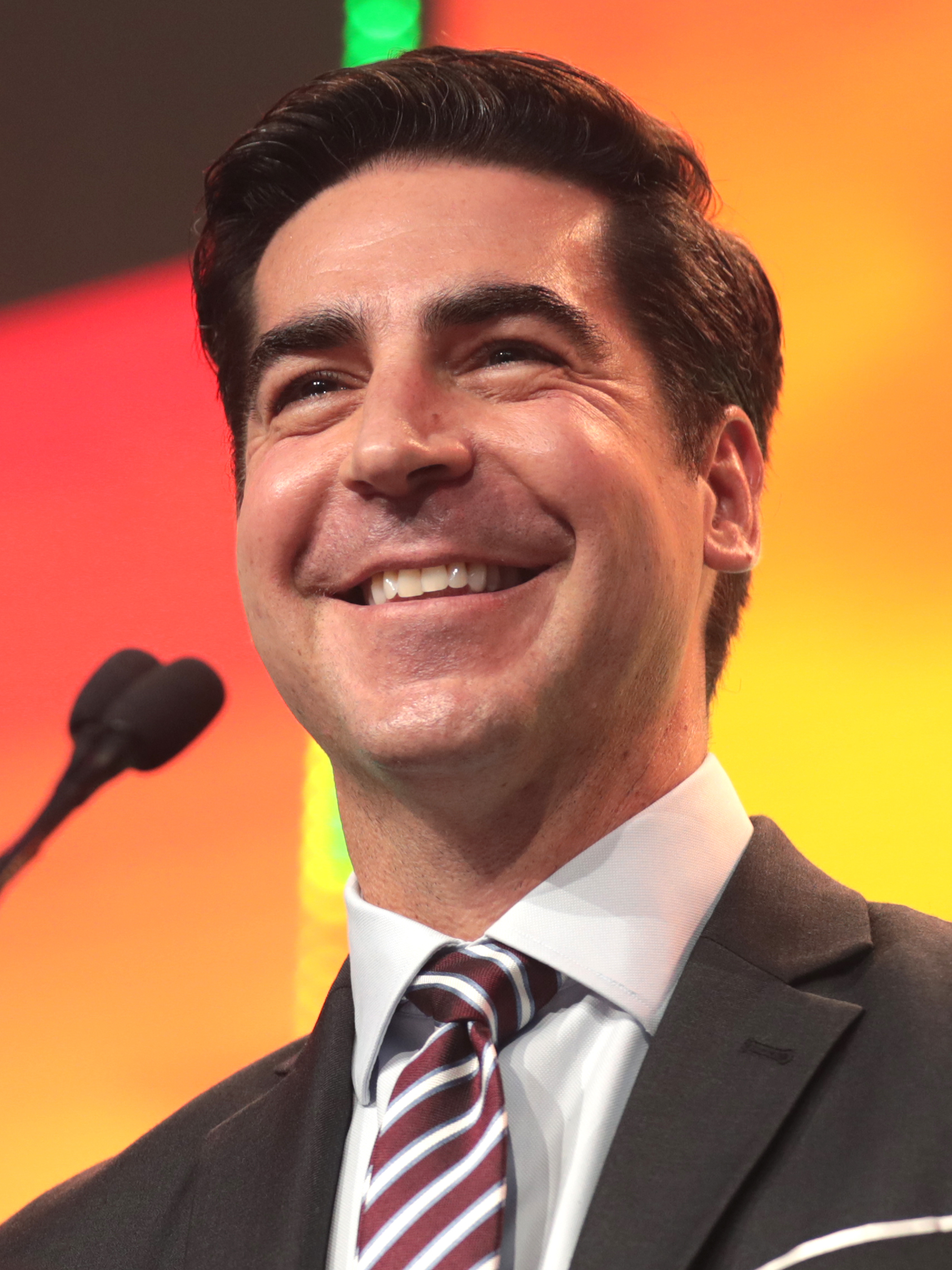
Jesse Watters

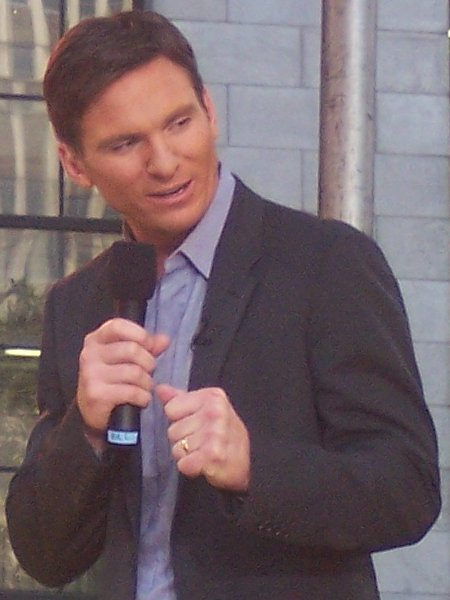
Bill Weir

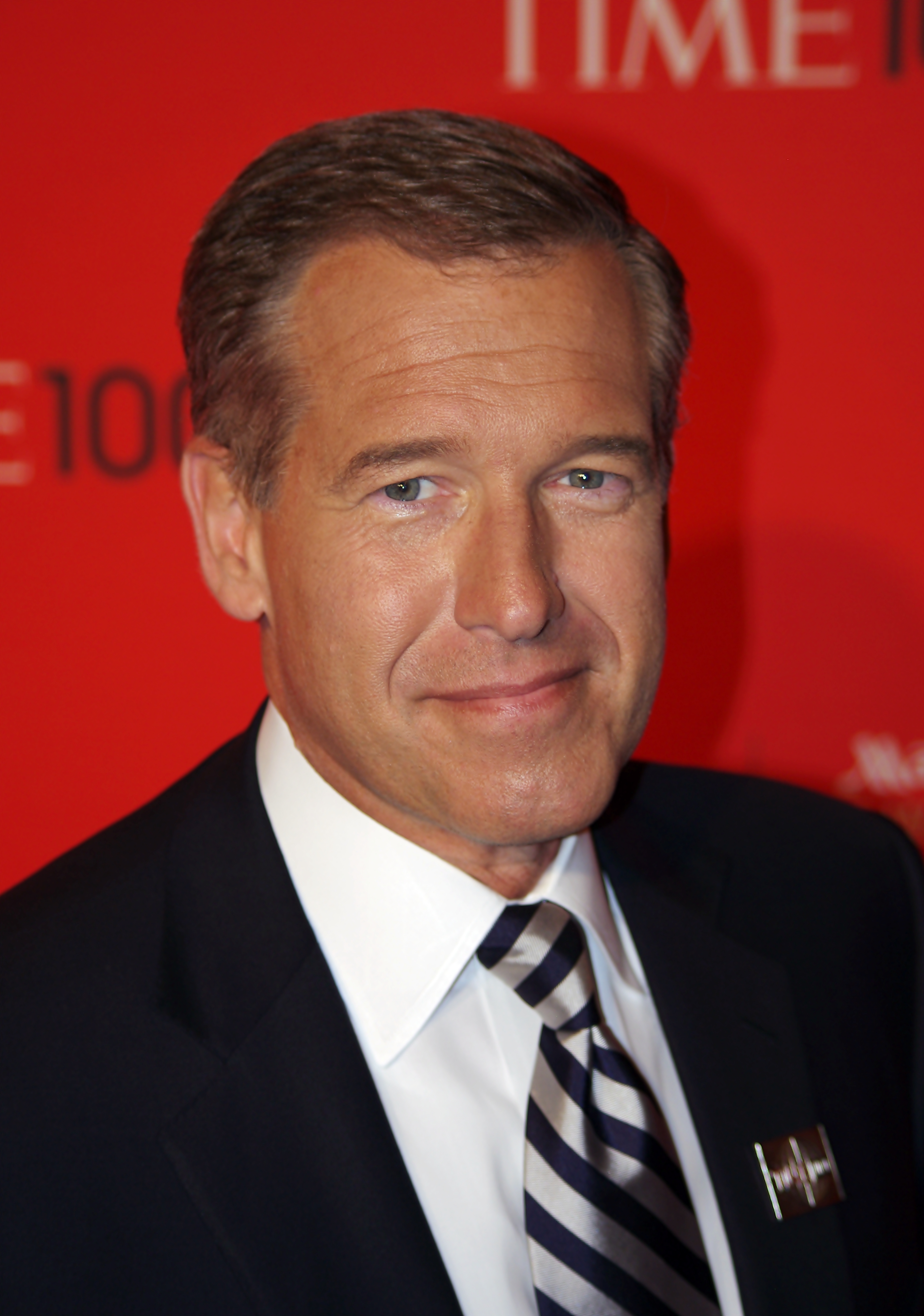
Brian Williams

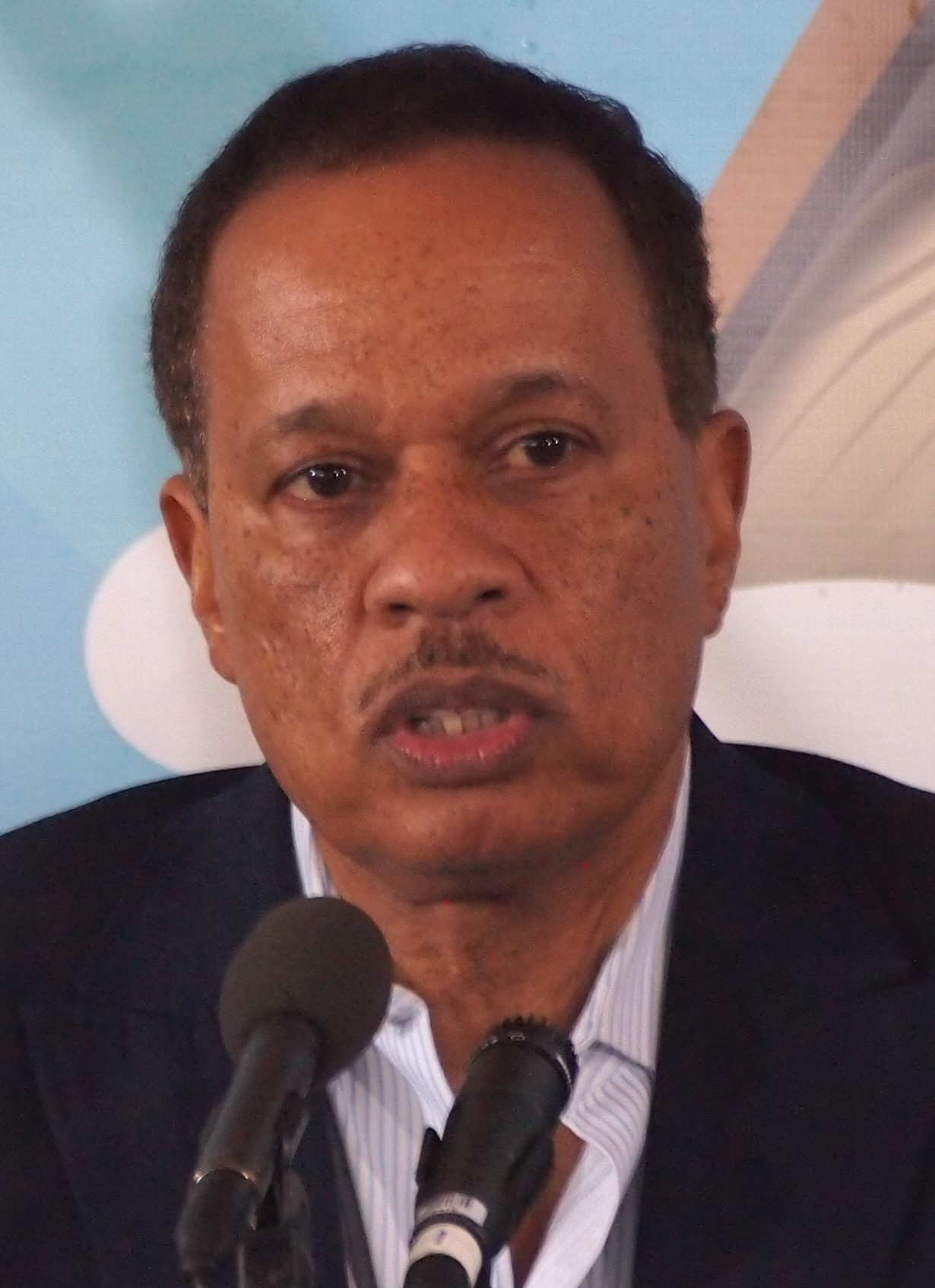
Juan Williams

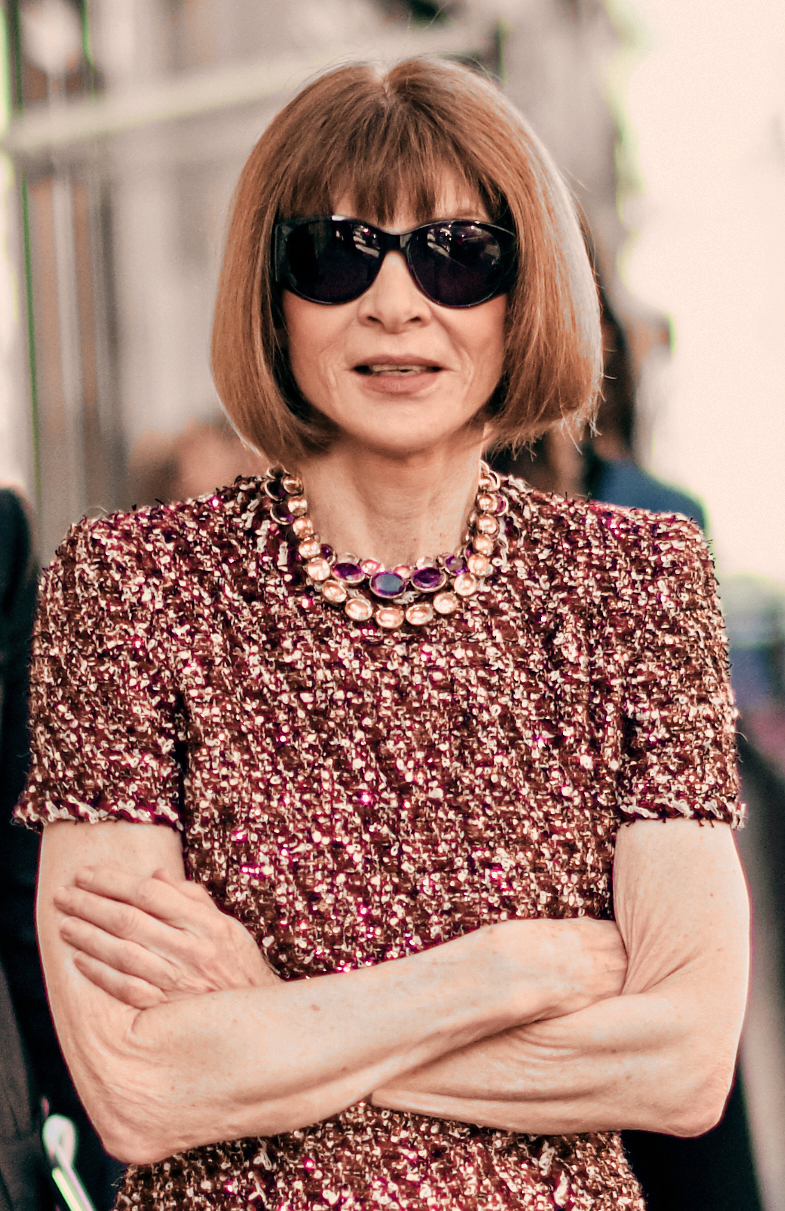
Anna Wintour

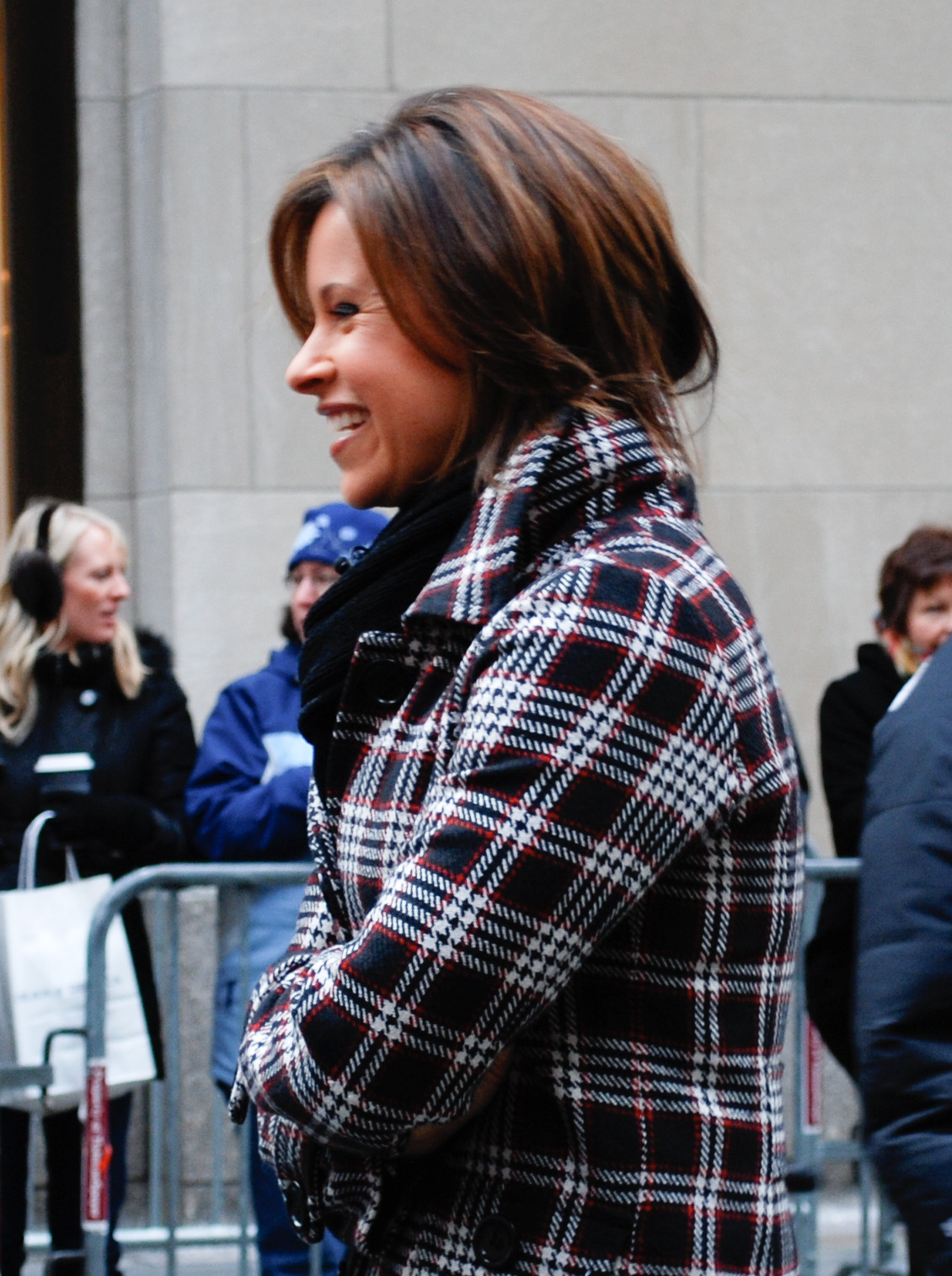
Jenna Wolfe

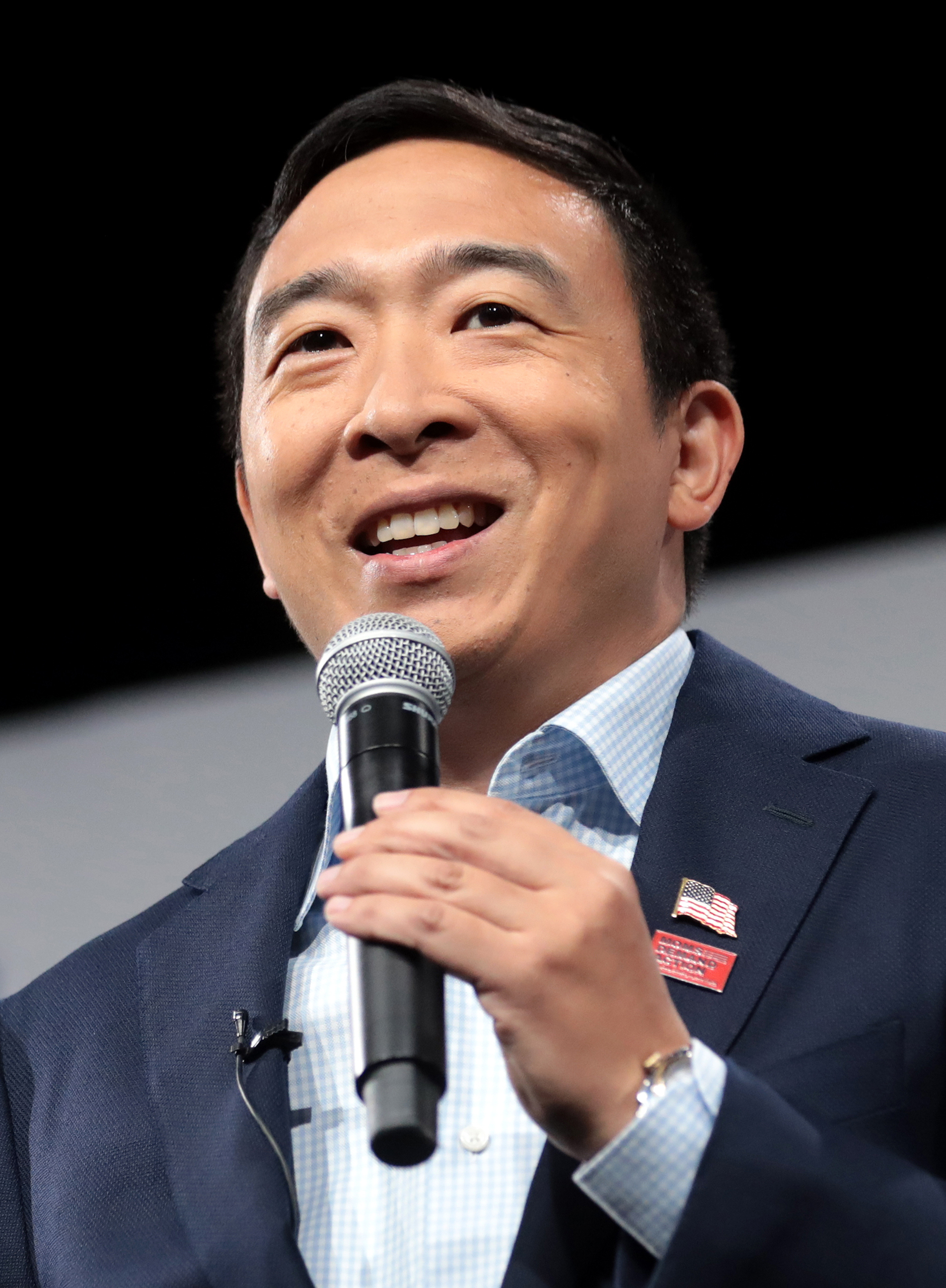
Andrew Yang

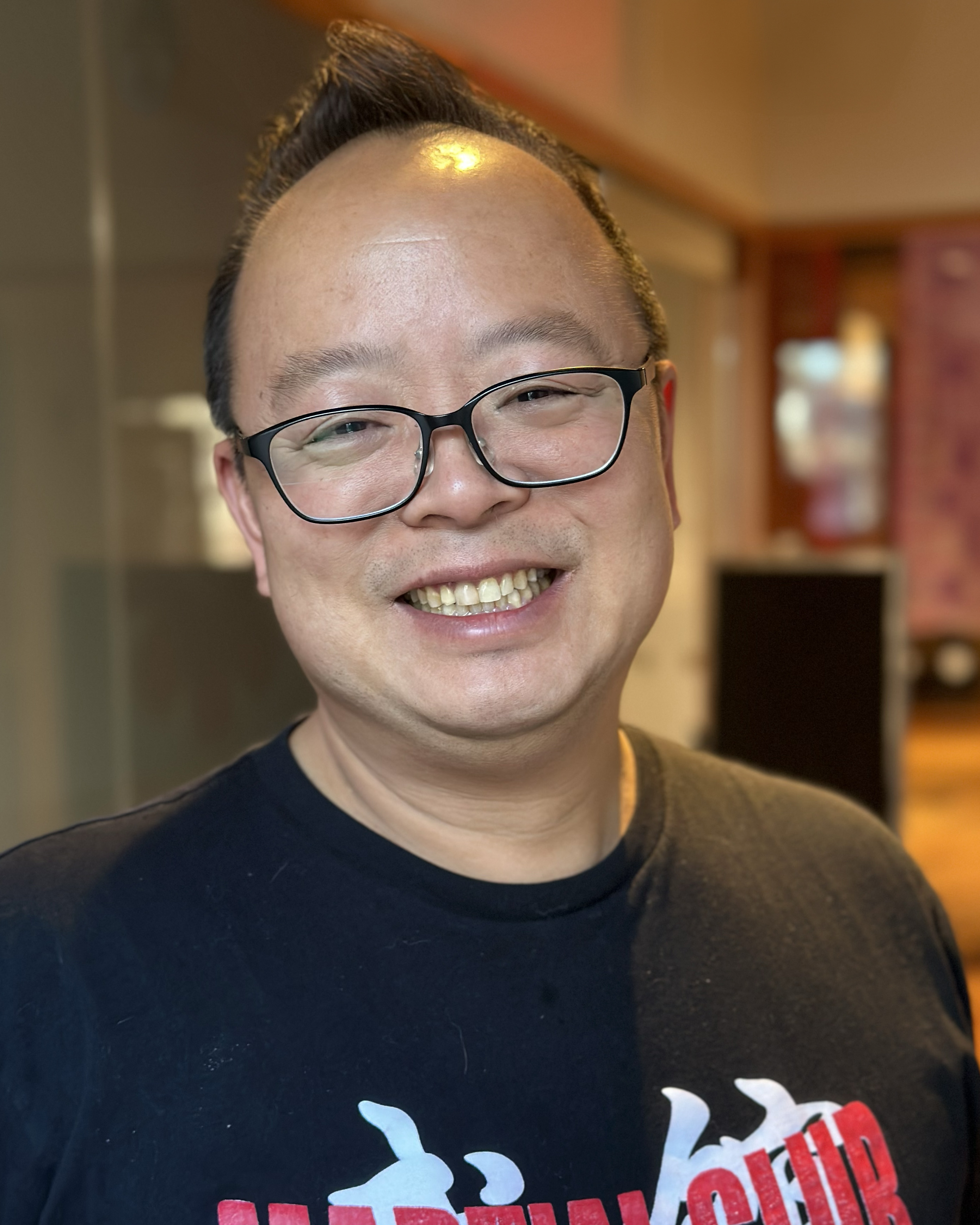
Jeff Yang

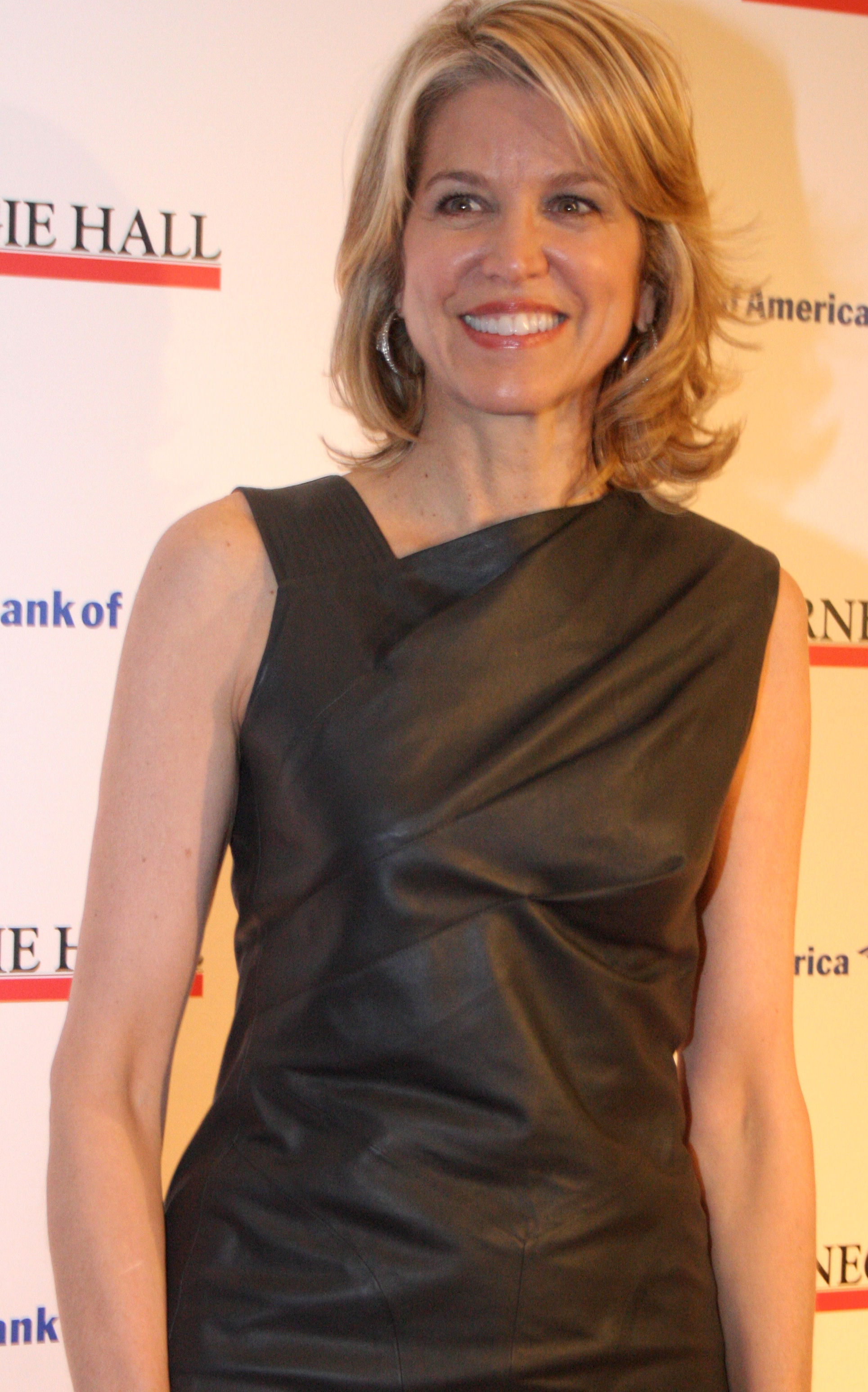
Paula Zahn

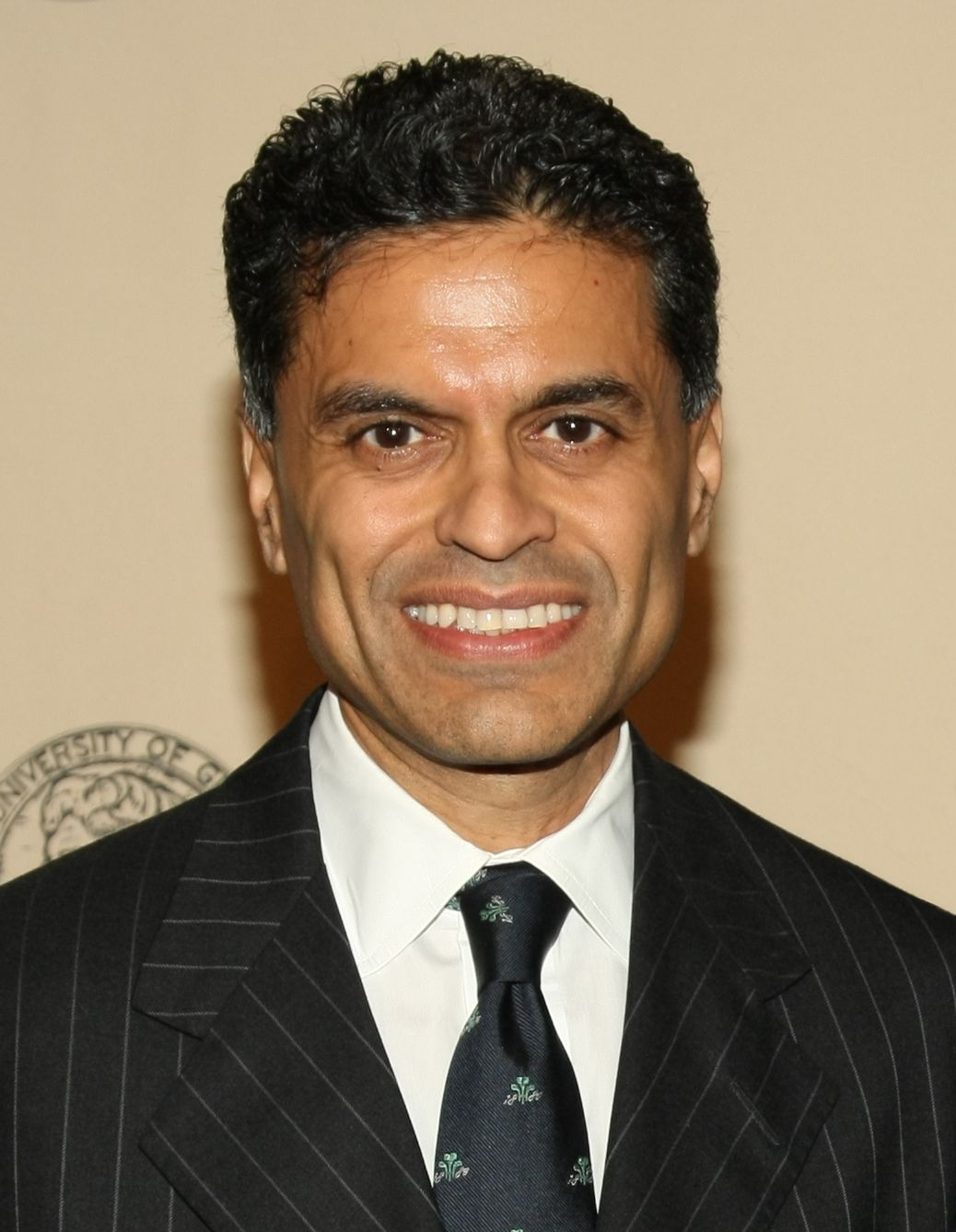
Fareed Zakaria

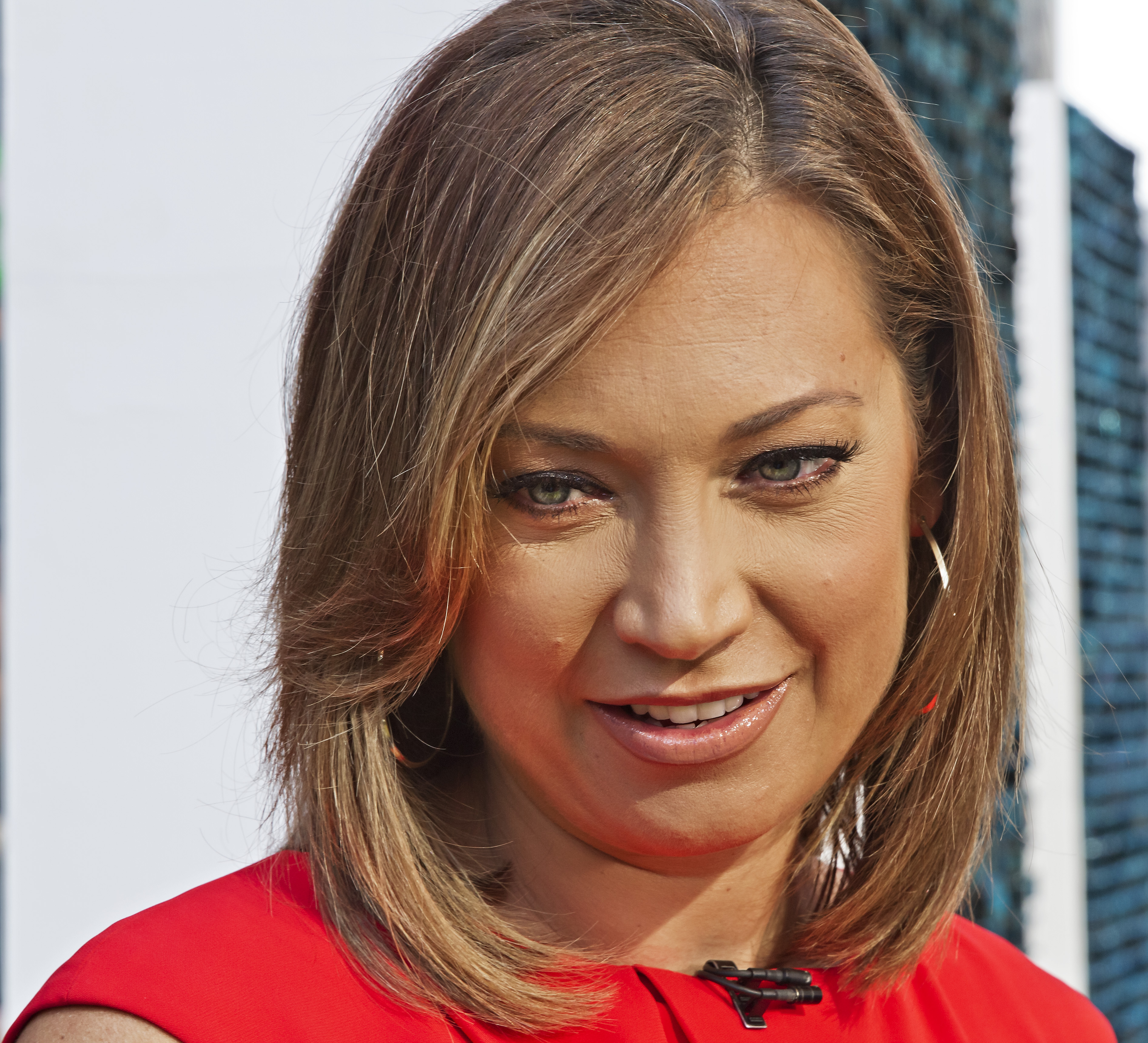
Ginger Zee

== A ==
- Ben Aaron – WPIX
- Dan Abrams – multiple networks
- Roz Abrams – multiple broadcast networks
- Tony Aiello – WCBS-TV
- Marv Albert – NBC Sports
- Cristina Alesci – formerly of CNN, Bloomberg News
- Sharyn Alfonsi – 60 Minutes
- Yashar Ali – New York Magazine
- Craig Allen – chief meteorologist, WCBS 880
- Ernie Anastos – WABC-TV, WCBS-TV, WNYW
- Jodi Applegate – WNYW
- Rose Arce – producer, journalist
- David Asman – Fox Business, Fox News
- Zain Asher – CNN
- Michael Ausiello – multiple media platforms
- John Avlon – CNN

== B ==
- Sade Baderinwa – WABC-TV
- Brooke Baldwin – author, former CNN newscaster
- Ellison Barber – NBC News
- Brian Balthazar – multiple networks
- Julie Banderas – Fox News
- Dean Baquet – The New York Times
- Ross Barkan – The New York Times Magazine, New York Magazine, The Guardian, The Nation
- Peter Barnes – multiple business platform networks
- Errol Barnett – CBS News
- Josh Barro – Business Insider
- Maria Bartiromo – Fox Business
- Joy Behar – The View
- John Berman – CNN
- Len Berman – WNBC, NBC Sports
- Bill Beutel – WABC-TV
- Jedediah Bila – Fox News
- Nick Bilton – executive producer, 60 Minutes
- Kate Bolduan – CNN
- Sandra Bookman – WABC-TV
- Keith Boykin – syndicated columnist
- Ben Brantley – The New York Times
- Margaret Brennan – CBS News, CNBC
- Jimmy Breslin – late journalist, New York Daily News
- Malan Breton – fashion journalist, OK!
- Contessa Brewer – multiple networks
- Dave Briggs – Fox News, NBC
- Tom Brokaw – formerly of NBC News (retired)
- Kristen Browde – WNBC, CBS News
- Frank Bruni – The New York Times
- Mika Brzezinski – MSNBC
- Erin Burnett – CNN
- Brenda Buttner – Fox News

== C ==
- Ana Cabrera – CNN
- Jack Cafferty – multiple platforms
- Will Cain – Fox News
- Mary Calvi – WCBS-TV, weekend anchor for Inside Edition
- Alisyn Camerota – CNN
- Rachel Campos-Duffy – Fox News
- Carl Cameron – formerly of Fox News
- Gretchen Carlson – formerly of Fox News
- Tracee Carrasco – Fox Business
- Michelle Caruso-Cabrera – multiple business journalism platforms
- Cheryl Casone – Fox Business
- Marysol Castro – meteorologist, Good Morning America
- Neil Cavuto – Fox News
- Sam Champion – meteorologist, WABC-TV
- Sewell Chan – senior fellow at the Annenberg Center on Communication Leadership & Policy
- Gordon G. Chang – multiple platforms
- Juju Chang – ABC News
- Laura Chang – journalist, editor of the Booming blog, The New York Times
- Lia Chang – photojournalist, multiple media platforms
- Michelle Charlesworth – WABC-TV
- Adrian Chen – investigative journalist; staff writer, The New Yorker
- Joie Chen – multiple broadcast networks
- Julie Chen Moonves – multiple broadcast networks
- Kiran Chetry – Fox News
- Heather Childers – Fox News, Newsmax TV
- Alina Cho – CNBC
- Liz Cho – WABC-TV
- Kelly Choi – NYC Media
- Alexis Christoforous – Yahoo! Finance
- Connie Chung – multiple broadcast networks
- Andy Cohen – multiple media platforms
- Kaitlan Collins – CNN
- Liz Claman – Fox Business
- Stephen Colbert – CBS, The Late Show with Stephen Colbert
- Jamie Colby – Fox News
- Bertha Coombs – CNBC
- Anderson Cooper – 60 Minutes, CBS, CNN
- Anthony Cormier – BuzzFeed News
- Howard Cosell – multiple sports platform outlets
- Bob Costas – NBC Sports
- Katie Couric – multiple broadcast networks
- Jim Cramer – CNBC
- Walter Cronkite – CBS News
- Chris Cuomo – NewsNation
- S. E. Cupp – CNN
- Ann Curry – investigative journalist

== D ==
- Aswath Damodaran – economic journalist; professor, New York University Stern School of Business
- Manohla Dargis – chief film critic, The New York Times
- Ted David – founding anchor, CNBC
- Janice Dean – Fox News
- Ernabel Demillo – CUNY TV
- Laurie Dhue – multiple broadcast platform networks
- John Dickerson – CBS News
- Angela Dimayuga – chef, food critic for The New York Times
- Diane Dimond – multiple broadcast platform networks
- Lou Dobbs – formerly of Fox Business
- Maureen Dowd – The New York Times
- Amanda Drury – CNBC
- Maurice DuBois – WCBS-TV
- David W. Dunlap – The New York Times
- Vladimir Duthiers – CBS News

== E ==
- Ainsley Earhardt – Fox News
- Sara Eisen – CNBC
- Sarah Kate Ellis – multimedia executive, CEO of GLAAD
- Sharon Epperson – CNBC
- Kelly Evans – CNBC

== F ==
- David Faber – CNBC
- Tamsen Fadal – WPIX
- Jimmy Fallon – NBC, The Tonight Show Starring Jimmy Fallon
- Paula Faris – formerly of ABC News and The View
- Ronan Farrow – The New Yorker
- Harris Faulkner – Fox News
- Donna Fiducia – Fox News
- Jill Filipovic – CNN
- Karen Finerman – CNBC
- Ira Joe Fisher – The Saturday Early Show
- Jami Floyd – formerly of Court TV News
- Rick Folbaum – Fox News
- Justin Fox – Bloomberg News
- Melissa Francis – Fox News
- Thomas Friedman – The New York Times
- Wilfred Frost – CNBC
- Ziwe Fumudoh – multiple media platforms

== G ==
- Michael Gargiulo – formerly of WTTG
- Laurie Garrett – public health journalist
- Susie Gharib – Nightly Business Report
- Kathie Lee Gifford – formerly of Today
- Alexis Glick – formerly of Fox Business
- Jeff Glor – CBS News
- Michelle Goldberg – The New York Times
- Whoopi Goldberg – The View, moderator
- Bianna Golodryga – formerly of ABC News and CBS News
- Juan González – Democracy Now!
- Marci Gonzalez – ABC News
- Amy Goodman – Democracy Now!
- Stephanie Gosk – NBC News
- Anne-Marie Green – CBS News
- Lauren Green – Fox News
- Bill Griffeth – CNBC'
- Roger Grimsby – WABC-TV
- Kimberly Guilfoyle – political analyst
- Bryant Gumbel – formerly of Today and Real Sports with Bryant Gumbel
- Greg Gumbel – CBS Sports and formerly of NBC Sports
- Savannah Guthrie – Today
- Greg Gutfeld – Fox News

== H ==
- Clyde Haberman – The New York Times
- Maggie Haberman – The New York Times
- Jenna Bush Hager – Today
- Sara Haines – ABC News, The View
- Tamron Hall – broadcast journalist, television talk show host, author
- Katie Halper – WBAI
- Sean Hannity – Fox News
- Donna Hanover – WPIX, WNYW
- Nanette Hansen – CBS, NBC, CNBC
- Poppy Harlow – CNN
- Mark Harris – multiple media platforms
- David Harsanyi – National Review
- Aishah Hasnie – Fox News
- Elisabeth Hasselbeck – Fox News, The View
- Chris Hayes – MSNBC
- Kathleen Hays – multiple business platforms
- Pete Hegseth – Fox News
- Bill Hemmer – Fox News
- Ed Henry – Fox News, CNN
- Sue Herera – CNBC
- Catherine Herridge – Fox News and CBS News
- E.D. Hill – Fox News
- Erica Hill – CBS News
- Perez Hilton – blogger
- Stephen Holden – The New York Times
- Lester Holt – NBC News
- Euny Hong – author, journalist
- Kit Hoover – Fox News
- Margaret Hoover – PBS
- Sunny Hostin – ABC News, The View, legal analyst
- Cindy Hsu – WCBS-TV
- Hua Hsu – The New Yorker
- Eddie Huang – writer, author of Fresh Off the Boat: A Memoir
- Juliet Huddy – WABC 770, Fox News
- Abby Huntsman – The View
- Janice Huff – chief meteorologist, WNBC
- Brit Hume – Fox News

== I ==
- Laura Ingle – NewsNation
- Laura Ingraham – Fox News
- Carol Iovanna – Fox News, WCBS-TV
- Walter Isaacson – multimedia journalist

== J ==
- Gregg Jarrett – Fox News
- Rebecca Jarvis – ABC News
- Peter Jennings – ABC News (d. 2005)
- Jim Jensen – WCBS-TV
- Mike Jerrick – Fox News
- John Johnson – multiple broadcast networks
- Kristine Johnson – WCBS-TV and formerly of Early Today
- Whit Johnson – ABC News
- Sheinelle Jones – NBC News
- Star Jones – The View
- Bill Jorgensen – WNYW
- Andrea Joyce – CBS Sports and NBC Sports

== K ==
- Joseph Kahn – editor-in-chief, The New York Times
- Jay Caspian Kang – The New York Times Magazine
- Jodi Kantor – The New York Times
- Michael Kay – sports journalist from the Bronx, New York Yankees TV broadcaster and CenterStage host on YES Network, host of The Michael Kay Show on WEPN-FM
- Megyn Kelly – formerly of NBC News and Fox News
- Terry Keenan – formerly of CNN and Fox News
- Kennedy – Fox Business
- Joe Kernen – CNBC
- Neeraj Khemlani – executive, Hearst Communications, CBS
- Brian Kilmeade – Fox & Friends
- Irene Kim – fashion journalist, multiple platforms
- Michael Kimmelman – architecture critic, The New York Times
- Gayle King – CBS News
- Anna Kisselgoff – dance critic, cultural news reporter, The New York Times
- Dorie Klissas – journalist, producer, NBC News, CBS News
- Sally Kohn – political commentator
- Anna Kooiman – NewsNation
- Steve Kornacki – NBC News
- Hoda Kotb – Today
- Marcia Kramer – WCBS-TV
- John Krasinski – actor, filmmaker, Some Good News
- Priya Krishna – food writer, The New York Times
- Sukanya Krishnan – WNYW
- Steve Kroft – 60 Minutes
- Paul Krugman – The New York Times
- Larry Kudlow – Fox Business
- Howard Kurtz – Fox News

== L ==
- Jennifer Lahmers – WNYW
- Padma Lakshmi – author, television host, cookbook actress, model
- Nicole Lapin – multiple media platforms
- Jenna Lee – Fox News through Fox Business
- Jennifer 8. Lee – credits including previous The New York Times journalism
- Min Jin Lee – author, journalist
- Brian Lehrer – WNYC
- John Leland – The New York Times
- Don Lemon – formerly of CNN
- Susan Li – multiple business journalism
- Betty Liu – Bloomberg News
- Bryan Llenas – Fox News
- Lynda Lopez – multiple broadcast networks and media platforms
- Hugo Lowell – Guardian US
- Rich Lowry – National Review
- Michael Lucas – The Advocate, HuffPost
- Richard Lui – MSNBC, NBC News
- Joan Lunden – Good Morning America, Today

== M ==
- Martha MacCallum – Fox News
- Elizabeth MacDonald – Fox Business
- Consuelo Mack – WealthTrack
- Rachel Maddow – MSNBC
- Sapna Maheshwari – business journalist, The New York Times
- Apoorva Mandavilli – health care and science journalist, The New York Times; founding editor-in-chief of the autism news site Spectrum
- Dave Marash – WCBS-TV
- Sal Marchiano – WPIX
- Michele Marsh – WCBS-TV, WNBC
- Carol Martin – WCBS-TV
- Anthony Mason – CBS News
- Tyler Mathisen – CNBC
- Jane Mayer – The New Yorker
- Bill Mazer – WNBC
- Meghan McCain – The View
- Bill McCuddy – Fox News
- Dagen McDowell – Fox Business, Fox News
- Lisa McRee – ABC News
- Robin Meade – HLN
- Ved Mehta – late, blind staff writer, The New Yorker
- Jillian Mele – Fox News
- Larry Mendte – WABC
- Curt Menefee – Fox Sports
- Seth Meyers – NBC, Late Night with Seth Meyers
- Al Michaels – sports commentator from Brooklyn
- Maria Molina – weather meteorologist, Fox News
- Seema Mody – CNBC
- Jeanne Moos – CNN
- Stephen Morgan – meteorologist, Fox Weather
- Clayton Morris – Fox News
- Adam Moss – New York Magazine
- David Muir – ABC News
- John Muller – WPIX
- Michael Musto – author, journalist

== N ==
- Vinita Nair – multiple broadcast networks
- Heather Nauert – multiple platforms
- Jim Nelson – editor-in-chief, GQ magazine
- Arthel Neville – Fox News
- Betty Nguyen – WPIX
- Reena Ninan – CBS News
- Trevor Noah – Comedy Central, The Daily Show with Trevor Noah
- Joe Nocera – Bloomberg News
- Deborah Norville – Inside Edition
- David Novarro – WABC-TV

== O ==
- Dean Obeidallah – CNN
- Kelly O'Donnell – CNBC
- Lawrence O'Donnell – MSNBC
- Norah O'Donnell – CBS News
- Rosie O'Donnell – The View
- Keith Olbermann – sports and political commentator, multiple media platforms
- John Oliver – Last Week Tonight with John Oliver
- Meg Oliver – CBS News
- Bill O'Reilly – formerly of Fox News and Inside Edition
- Charles Osgood – CBS News (retired)
- Lisa Oz – Fox 5 New York

== P ==
- Christina Park – multiple broadcast networks
- Jane Pauley – CBS News
- Scott Pelley – 60 Minutes, CBS
- Perri Peltz – CNN
- Uma Pemmaraju – formerly of WMAR-TV, Fox News
- Dana Perino – Fox News
- Nicole Petallides – Schwab Network
- Jeanine Pirro – Fox News
- Bob Pisani – CNBC
- Byron Pitts – ABC News
- Robin Pogrebin – The New York Times
- Dave Portnoy – blogger; founder, Barstool Sports
- Elizabeth Prann – Fox News, HLN

== Q ==
- Norma Quarles – NBC News
- Richard Quest – CNN
- Becky Quick – CNBC
- Elaine Quijano – CBS News
- Lonnie Quinn – chief meteorologist, WCBS-TV
- Carl Quintanilla – CNBC

== R ==
- Dan Rather – multiple broadcast networks
- Judith Regan – Judith Regan Tonight
- Trish Regan – multiple broadcast networks
- Joy Reid – MSNBC
- David Remnick – editor, The New Yorker
- Michael Riedel – New York Post, WOR
- Birmania Ríos – Univision
- Kelly Ripa – anchor, Live with Kelly and Mark
- Bill Ritter – WABC-TV
- Frances Rivera – NBC News
- Geraldo Rivera – multiple news outlets
- Tanya Rivero – CBS News 24/7
- Amy Robach – ABC News
- Deborah Roberts – ABC News
- Robin Roberts – ABC News, ESPN
- Thomas Roberts – multiple endeavors
- Darlene Rodriguez – WNBC-TV
- Julie Roginsky – Fox News
- Al Roker – Today
- Christine Romans – CNN
- Steven Romo – NBC News, MSNBC
- Charlie Rose – formerly of multiple news outlets
- Jim Rosenfeld – WCAU
- David Roth – Defector Media
- Dave Rubin – political commentator, YouTuber, talk show host, and author
- Christopher Ruddy – Newsmax
- Amber Ruffin – Peacock
- Stephanie Ruhle – MSNBC
- Louis Rukeyser – Wall Street Week with Louis Rukeyser, Wall Street Week with Fortune, Louis Rukeyser's Wall Street
- Tim Russert – formerly of NBC News and CNBC
- Jim Ryan – WNYW
- Sam Ryan – WABC-TV

== S ==
- Rick Santelli – CNBC
- Nicole Saphier – medical correspondent, Fox News
- Diane Sawyer – multiple broadcast networks
- Chuck Scarborough – WNBC-TV
- Joe Scarborough – MSNBC
- Dick Schaap – multiple platform outlets
- Bob Schieffer – CBS News
- Rob Schmitt – Fox News
- Mike Schneider – formerly ABC News, NBC News, and Bloomberg Television
- John Schubeck – NBC News
- Jim Sciutto – CNN
- A. O. Scott – The New York Times
- Jon Scott – Fox News
- Rosanna Scotto – WNYW
- Dionne Searcey – The New York Times
- John Seigenthaler – NBC News
- Bob Sellers – multiple business journalism outlets
- Andrew Serwer – editor-in-chief, Yahoo! Finance
- Eric Shawn – Fox News
- Carley Shimkus – Fox News
- Maria Shriver – formerly of CBS News and NBC News
- Choire Sicha – editor, The New York Times style section
- Marc Siegel – medical correspondent, Fox News
- Nate Silver – statistician, founder/editor of FiveThirtyEight
- Sue Simmons – WNBC
- Jane Skinner – Fox News
- Simran Jeet Singh – Religion News Service
- Ben Smith – editor-in-chief, BuzzFeed News
- Harry Smith – NBC News; formerly of CBS News
- Rolland Smith – WCBS
- Sandra Smith – CNBC; formerly of Fox News
- Shepard Smith – co-founding anchor, Fox News
- Stephen A. Smith – sports journalist, ESPN; born in The Bronx; raised in Queens
- Tracy Smith – 48 Hours, CBS News Sunday Morning
- Tom Snyder – multiple broadcast platforms
- Kate Snow – multiple broadcast platforms
- Andrew Ross Sorkin – The New York Times, CNBC
- Lara Spencer – ABC News
- Hari Sreenivasan – PBS NewsHour Weekend
- Sreenath Sreenivasan – technology journalist
- Lesley Stahl – 60 Minutes
- Brian Stelter – CNN
- George Stephanopoulos – ABC News
- Jon Stewart – Comedy Central
- Lori Stokes – WNYW
- Michael Strahan – ABC News
- Brian Sullivan – multiple broadcast journalist platforms
- Margaret Sullivan – columnist, The Guardian, executive director for the Craig Newmark Center for Journalism Ethics and Security at Columbia Journalism School
- A. G. Sulzberger – journalist, publisher, The New York Times
- Arthur Ochs Sulzberger Jr. – journalist; chairman, The New York Times Company
- Stephanie Sy – CNN

== T ==
- André Leon Talley – late fashion journalist, Vogue
- Andrea Tantaros – Fox News
- Kayla Tausche – CNBC
- Felicia Taylor – CNBC
- Mark Thompson – former president and chief executive officer, The New York Times Company
- Kat Timpf – Fox News
- Anthony Tommasini – music critic, The New York Times
- Kaity Tong – WPIX
- Andy Towle – blogger, political commentator, founder of Towleroad
- Katy Tur – NBC News
- Dana Tyler – WCBS-TV

== U ==
- David Ushery – WNBC

== V ==
- Greta Van Susteren – multiple broadcast networks
- Elizabeth Vargas – multiple broadcast networks
- Jane Velez-Mitchell – multiple broadcast networks
- Ali Velshi – MSNBC
- Arun Venugopal – WNYC, The New York Times, Gothamist
- Linda Vester – Fox News
- Meredith Vieira – 25 Words or Less, The Meredith Vieira Show, The View, Today
- Leland Vittert – NewsNation; formerly of Fox News
- Rohit Vyas – first and longest-serving Indian-American broadcast journalist

== W ==
- Gernot Wagner – Bloomberg News "Risky Climate" columnist
- Grant Wahl – late sports journalist, multiple media platforms
- Bree Walker – WCBS-TV, KCBS-TV
- David Wallace-Wells – climate journalist, The New York Times
- Barbara Walters – multiple broadcast networks
- Jim Watkins – WTNH
- Jesse Watters – Fox News
- Rolonda Watts – former host of Rolonda and on-camera announcer for Judge Joe Brown
- Juli Weiner – HBO
- Bill Weir – ABC News, CNN
- Jane Wells – CNBC
- Jann Wenner – co-founder, publisher, Rolling Stone
- Ross Westgate – CNBC
- Bill Whitaker – 60 Minutes, CBS News
- Brian Williams – NBC News
- Diana Williams – WABC-TV
- Eboni K. Williams – Fox News
- Juan Williams – Fox News
- Gerri Willis – multiple broadcast platforms
- Anna Wintour – editor-in-chief, Vogue
- Alex Witt – MSNBC
- Joe Witte – multiple broadcast networks
- Warner Wolf – multiple broadcast networks
- Jenna Wolfe – journalist, television news host
- Carmen Rita Wong – CNBC
- Kelly Wright – Fox News

== Y ==
- Sophia Yan – The Daily Telegraph; classical pianist
- Andrew Yang – Crains New York, CNN
- Jeff Yang – "Tao Jones" columnist, The Wall Street Journal

== Z ==
- Paula Zahn – multiple broadcast networks
- Fareed Zakaria – CNN
- Ginger Zee – chief meteorologist, ABC News

== See also ==
- Chinese journalists in New York City
- Filipino journalists in New York City
- Indian journalists in New York City
- Korean journalists in New York City
- LGBTQ journalists in New York City
- List of The New Yorker contributors
- Media in New York City
