= Self-immolation of Aaron Bushnell =

2024 suicide protesting Israel's invasion of Gaza

- Part of the Gaza war protests in the United States
- Bushnell on fire in front of the Israeli embassy
- Date: February 25, 2024
- Location: Washington, D.C., United States; 38°56′32.9″N 77°04′04.4″W
- Type: Self-immolation
- Motive: Opposition to United States support for Israel in the Gaza war
- Deaths: Aaron Bushnell

On February 25, 2024, Aaron Bushnell, a 25-year-old serviceman of the United States Air Force, died after setting himself on fire outside the front gate of the Embassy of Israel in Washington, D.C. Immediately before the act, which was live-streamed on Twitch, Bushnell said that he was protesting against "what people have been experiencing in Palestine at the hands of their colonizers" and declared that he "will no longer be complicit in genocide", after which he doused himself with a flammable liquid and set himself on fire.

As he burned, Bushnell repeatedly shouted "Free Palestine!" The fire was eventually extinguished by Secret Service officers. The Metropolitan Police Department also responded to assist the Secret Service. Bushnell was transported to a local hospital in critical condition and was declared dead in the evening.

Bushnell's act was the second self-immolation protesting United States support for Israel in the Gaza war. In December 2023, another protestor had set herself on fire at the Israeli consulate in Atlanta. Some supporters of Palestine, including Palestinian militant groups, viewed Bushnell's act as heroic and called him a martyr. Others argued that Bushnell's act should not be praised or viewed as a legitimate form of political protest, warning about "copycats" who might imitate it.

== Background ==
=== Bushnell's upbringing and views ===
Bushnell grew up in Orleans, Massachusetts, in the isolated Christian Community of Jesus compound. He attended Nauset Regional High School, and worked for a Brewster, Massachusetts-based Christian book, music, and video publishing company from 2015 to 2017. He told a friend that he left the Community of Jesus in 2019.

He started his career with the United States Air Force (USAF) in May 2020, having completed Basic & Technical Training. He was trained as a Client Systems Technician, specializing in cybersecurity. He later worked as a USAF DevOps engineer in San Antonio, Texas, and was pursuing an undergraduate degree in software engineering from Southern New Hampshire University.

A friend of Bushnell named Lupe Barboza said in an interview with Al Jazeera that Bushnell was religious and anti-imperialistic, but that she did not think that Bushnell was mentally ill. Other friends said that Bushnell's contract with the military was to expire in May and that, following the police murder of George Floyd, Bushnell became more open in his objections with the military.

Bushnell thought of himself as an anarchist. Less than two weeks before his death, he talked with a friend about their shared identities as anarchists and the risks and sacrifices that are needed to be effective as anarchists. Bushnell used the anarchist symbol as his profile photo on the Twitch account he used to livestream his self-immolation, and his username was "LillyAnarKitty". He also followed and liked several anarchist pages on Facebook. In the last months of his life he also published many posts in various anarchism-related Reddit communities. CrimethInc, an anarchist collective, claimed that Bushnell contacted it shortly before his death, asking it to "make sure that the footage is preserved and reported on".

The Intercept found that Bushnell used a Reddit account with the username "acebush1". This user posted on Reddit denouncing Israel as a "settler colonialist apartheid state", and wrote in a comment about the Israeli civilians murdered by Hamas at the Nova music festival: "those people's fun at the music festival was specifically built on Palestinian suffering. There are no innocent civilians in se[t]ller colonialism". He also called Hamas an "anti-colonial resistance organization", and according to one of his friends who was with him on October 7, their reaction to Hamas's attack was "Cool, they broke out of their prison."

=== December 2023 Atlanta self-immolation ===
Bushnell was not the first person in the US to use self-immolation to protest against Israel over the Palestinian humanitarian crisis. On December 1, 2023, an individual, whose identity was not revealed by Atlanta authorities, protested via self-immolation outside the Israeli consulate in Atlanta, Georgia, which resulted in the protester having critical injuries.

== Event ==
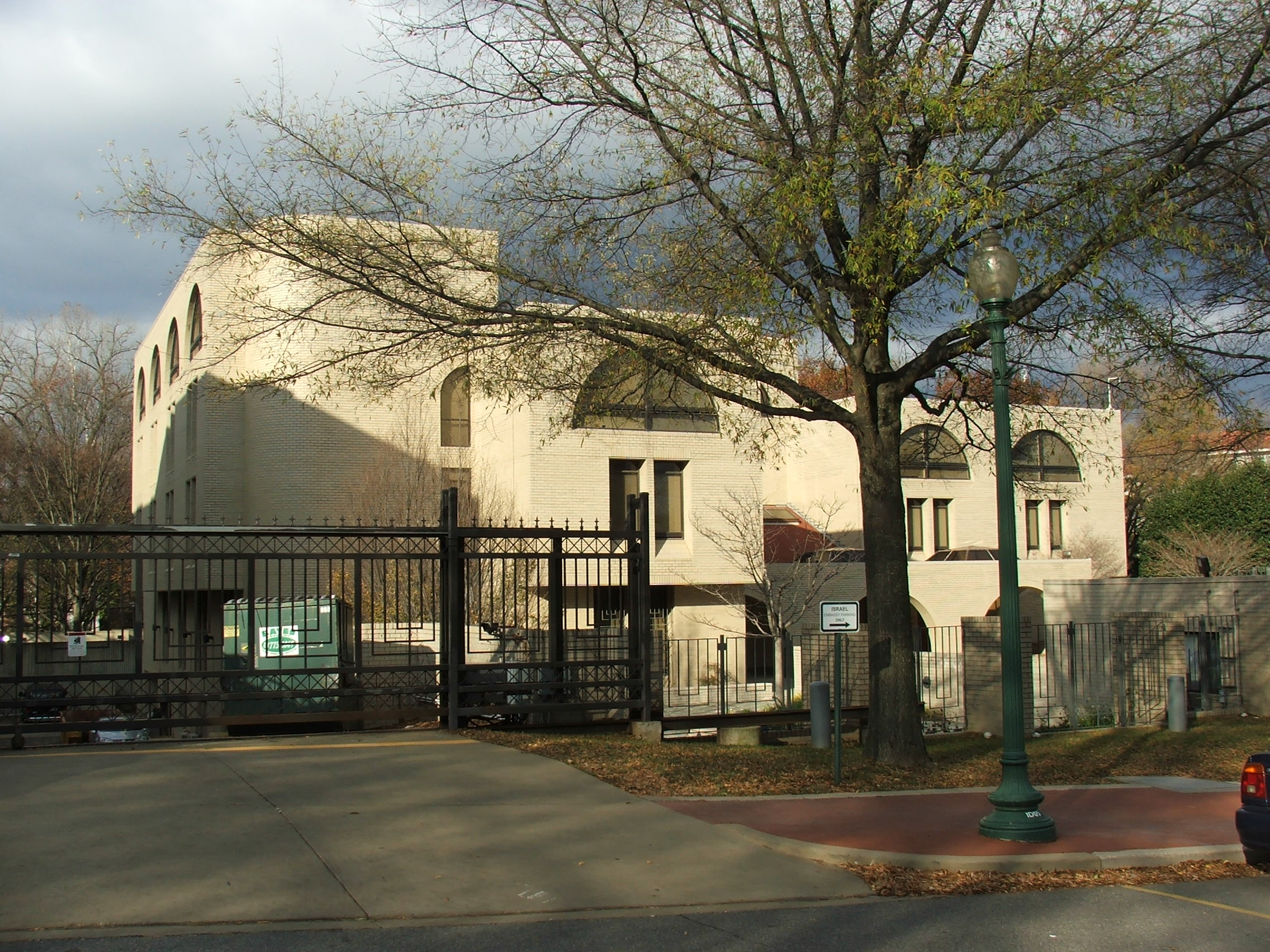
Front gate of the Embassy of Israel, where Bushnell set himself on fire

Bushnell drafted a will before immolating himself, which left instructions for his savings to be donated to the Palestine Children's Relief Fund and his cat to be left with a neighbor after his death. On February 25, 2024, 10:54 a.m. local time, the morning of his self-immolation, Bushnell had posted a message on Facebook: "Many of us like to ask ourselves, 'What would I do if I was alive during slavery? Or the Jim Crow South? Or apartheid? What would I do if my country was committing genocide?' The answer is, you're doing it. Right now." He sent a message to media outlets: "Today, I am planning to engage in an extreme act of protest against the genocide of the Palestinian people."

At approximately 12:58 p.m. local time, Bushnell, dressed in military fatigues, approached the Israeli Embassy in Washington, D.C., intending to immolate himself as an act of protest against the Gaza war. He had created a Twitch account under the name "LillyAnarKitty" with a Palestinian flag as his profile banner and the caption "Free Palestine." While live-streaming, he walked towards the embassy and said:

I am an active duty member of the United States Air Force. And I will no longer be complicit in genocide. I am about to engage in an extreme act of protest. But compared to what people have been experiencing in Palestine at the hands of their colonizers—it's not extreme at all. This is what our ruling class has decided will be normal.

Outside the embassy, Bushnell placed his camera down, positioned himself in front of the gates, and poured a flammable liquid over himself. A security officer approached Bushnell, asking if he needed help, but was ignored.

After igniting himself, Bushnell repeatedly shouted "Free Palestine!" as he was burning, and eventually collapsed to the ground. The security officer radioed in for assistance. A Secret Service officer approached the scene, aimed a gun at Bushnell off-camera, and ordered him to "get on the ground" multiple times while a police officer yelled: "I don't need guns, I need fire extinguishers!" Multiple officers responded to the scene and used fire extinguishers on Bushnell. He was transported to a local hospital by the DC Fire & EMS. At 8:06 p.m. local time, about seven hours after his self-immolation, Bushnell was declared dead from his burn injuries.

== Investigation ==
The Secret Service, Metropolitan Police Department, and the Bureau of Alcohol, Tobacco, Firearms and Explosives announced they would investigate the incident. The Metropolitan Police refused to confirm the authenticity of the livestream, and the US Air Force cited family notification policies while refusing to speak initially on the situation. A bomb disposal unit was dispatched to investigate concerns of a suspicious vehicle that could have been connected to Bushnell. The area was later declared safe after nothing hazardous was discovered.

A public incident report given to reporters by the Metropolitan Police Department states that Bushnell was "exhibiting signs of mental distress"—namely that he had "doused himself with an unidentified liquid and set himself on fire"—before the Secret Service could reach him. A spokesperson for the Israeli embassy reported that no staff members were injured in the incident.

== Reactions ==
=== Domestic ===
==== Elected officials ====
Asked by the Associated Press whether "Bushnell's self-immolation might indicate that there is a deeper issue" with US military personnel being concerned about how weapons are used, Pentagon Press Secretary Patrick S. Ryder reaffirmed US support for Israel's operations.

The day after Bushnell's death, Senator Bernie Sanders said, "It's obviously a terrible tragedy, but I think it speaks to the depths of despair that so many people are feeling now about the horrific humanitarian disaster taking place in Gaza, and I share those deep concerns." On March 7, Senator Tom Cotton, who said that Bushnell committed an "act of horrific violence—in support of a terrorist group", proposed two bills that would revoke the security clearances of people who express support for foreign terrorist organizations and codify by statute regulations that ban military service members from participating in protests.

==== Others ====
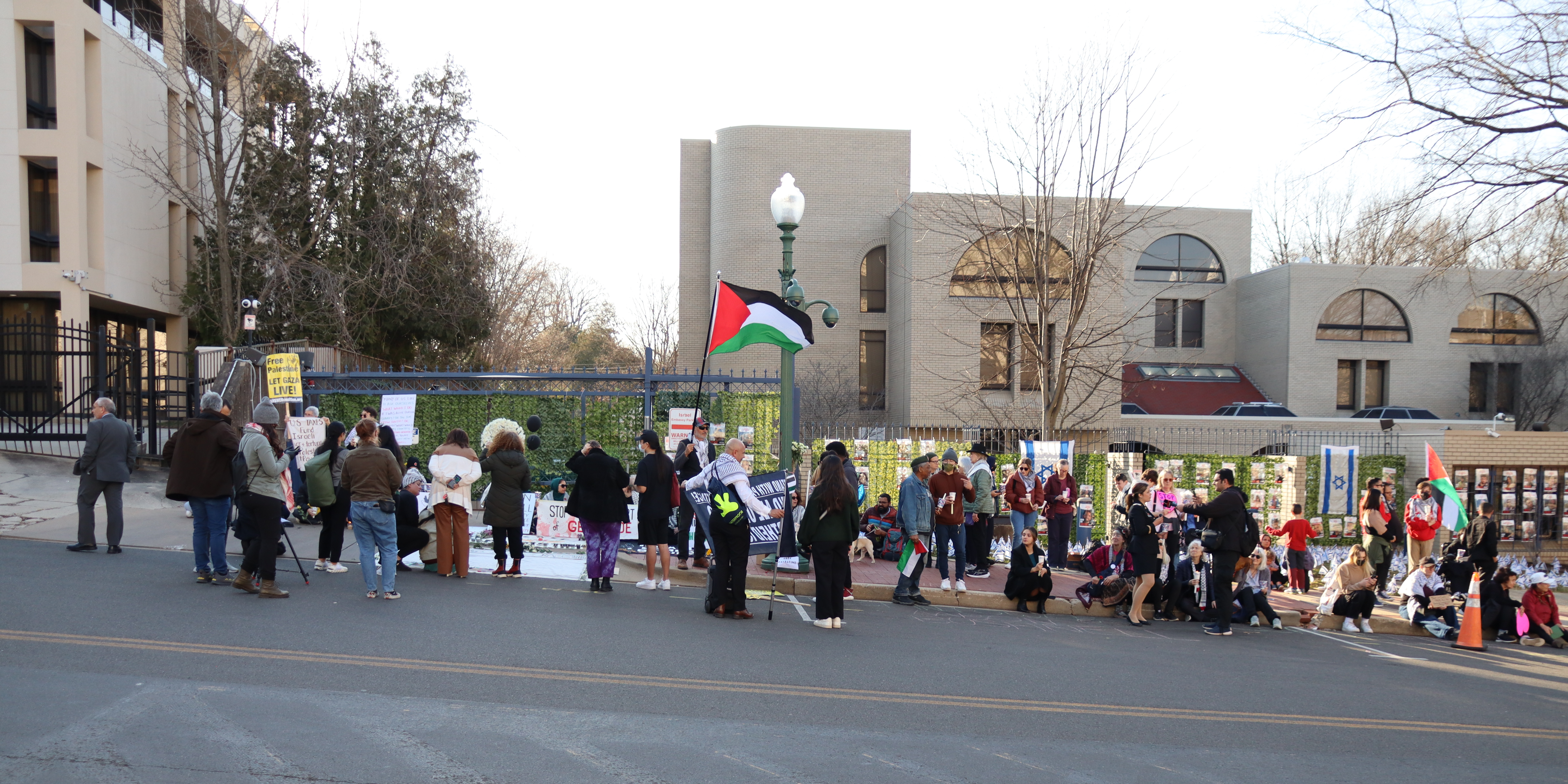
A vigil to Aaron Bushnell held outside of the Israeli embassy on February 26, 2024

After Bushnell's self-immolation, activists such as Aya Hijazi praised it, as did Green Party presidential candidate Jill Stein and independent presidential candidate Cornel West.

Some on social media viewed Bushnell's act as heroic and sacrificial. Some Palestinians called him a martyr. Others said his act should not be praised or viewed as a legitimate form of political protest, warning about "copycats" who might imitate it. Some called the public adoration and praising of his act a "death cult". Graeme Wood of The Atlantic wrote "Stop Glorifying Self-Immolation: The tendency to celebrate and encourage this behavior, or even to be moved by it, strikes me as deeply sick."

Many who identified themselves as service members used gallows humor when discussing Bushnell online. Others were critical of Bushnell's commanding officers, believing they could have helped deter him.

On February 26, 2024, more than 100 people attended a vigil in Bushnell's memory in front of the Israeli embassy. Additional vigils were held in other American cities, some organized by the anti-war group Code Pink. On February 28, 2024, a vigil was held outside of the Wyatt Federal Building in Portland, Oregon, by advocacy group About Face: Veterans Against the War, in which multiple veterans lined up and took turns burning their military clothing in front of a banner reading "Veterans say: Free Palestine! Remember Aaron Bushnell."

Bushnell posthumously received the 2024 Sam Adams Award for Integrity in Intelligence for "performing a vital public service at the greatest cost—martyrdom—for truth-telling."

=== International ===
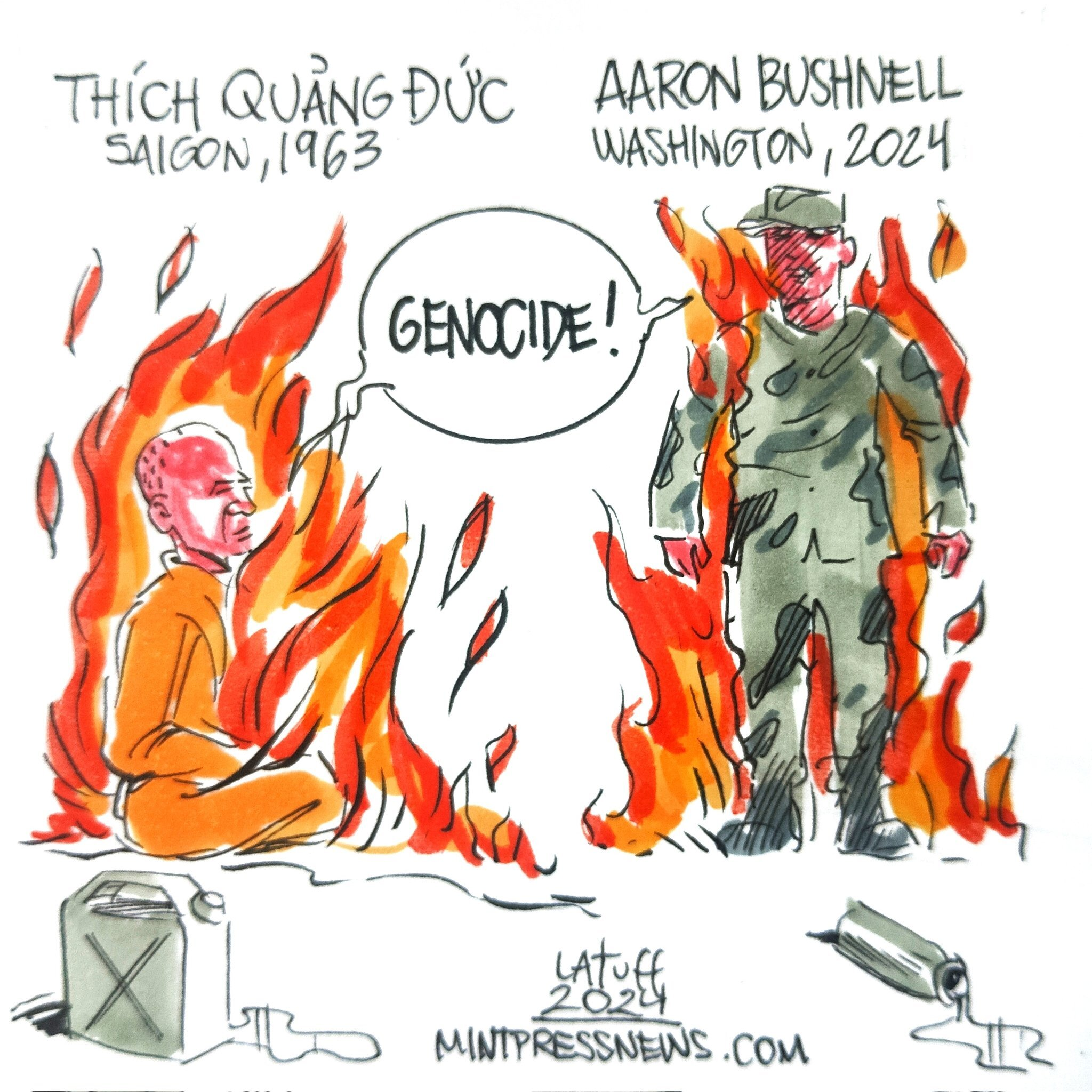
A political cartoon by Brazilian cartoonist Carlos Latuff comparing Bushnell to Thích Quảng Đức

Hamas praised the act and expressed "heartfelt condolences" to the friends and family of Bushnell, announcing in a statement on Telegram that "he immortalised his name as a defender of human values and the oppression of the suffering Palestinian people because of the American administration and its unjust policies" and calling him a "heroic pilot". The Popular Front for the Liberation of Palestine released a statement honoring Bushnell, calling his death "the highest sacrifice." Palestinian activist Mohammed el-Kurd called it a "call to action" to "undermine these regimes that are killing us."

Iran's Supreme Leader Ayatollah Khamenei highlighted Bushnell's actions in two X posts made a few hours apart. The first called out the "West's disgraceful antihuman policies with regard to the genocide in Gaza". The second indicated the genocide in Gaza was too much for "that young person who was brought up in the Western culture." Writing in The Jerusalem Post, Seth Frantzman accused pro-Iranian social media accounts of exploiting Bushnell's act of protest in English-language media at the Iranian regime's behest.

Officials in the Palestinian city of Jericho announced on March 10 that they had named a street in Bushnell's honor.

== Media coverage ==
Some sources criticized mainstream media outlets' coverage of Bushnell's self-immolation for what they called attempts to "discredit" and "dilute" Bushnell's motive of protesting what he called the genocide of Palestinians. In an Al Jazeera column, Belén Fernández criticized The New York Times for not mentioning Bushnell's motive in the title of its report and Time for not elaborating on what she considers the "mentally disturbing" political reality of the U.S. backing Israel in the Gaza conflict. The Guardian argued that pro-Israel news outlets implied without evidence that Bushnell was mentally ill.

In The Hill's commentary series Rising, Briahna Joy Gray pointed out that The New York Times was treating Bushnell asymmetrically compared to its coverage of Irina Slavina, a Russian journalist who died by self-immolation protesting the Russian government in 2020. The Times article about Slavina included the phrase "blaming government" in the title.

== Misinformation ==
Shortly following Bushnell's death, a fabricated screenshot circulated on social media showing a Reddit account operated by Bushnell making the comment "Palestine will be free when all the jews [sic] are dead." Fact-checking website Snopes found the screenshot to be a hoax.

Several people posted public comments claiming that a man seen on video pointing a gun at Bushnell was an Israeli guard; he was actually a United States Secret Service member who was trying to ensure the safety of two others who were attempting to extinguish the fire Bushnell set.

Multiple X users published claims that the Israeli intelligence organization Mossad had mocked Bushnell's death. These turned out to be false claims based on mistaking a parody account for Mossad's account.

== Similar self-immolations ==
- On September 11, 2024, a man set himself on fire near the Israeli consulate in Boston. He was later identified as Matt Nelson, and he was found to have posted a video on social media before the incident in which he "said he was 'about to engage in an extreme act' to protest 'ongoing genocide in Gaza'." Nelson died from his burn injuries on September 15.
- On October 5, 2024, Samuel Mena Jr., who identified himself as a journalist, set his arm on fire in front of the White House. He survived with non-life-threatening injuries as bystanders poured water and put the flame out with towels. Before the incident, Mena posted on social media slogans such as "End settler colonialism" and "From the river to the sea".

== See also ==
- Gaza war protests in the United States
- List of political self-immolations
