= Emily Jashinsky =

American journalist and commentator (born 1993)

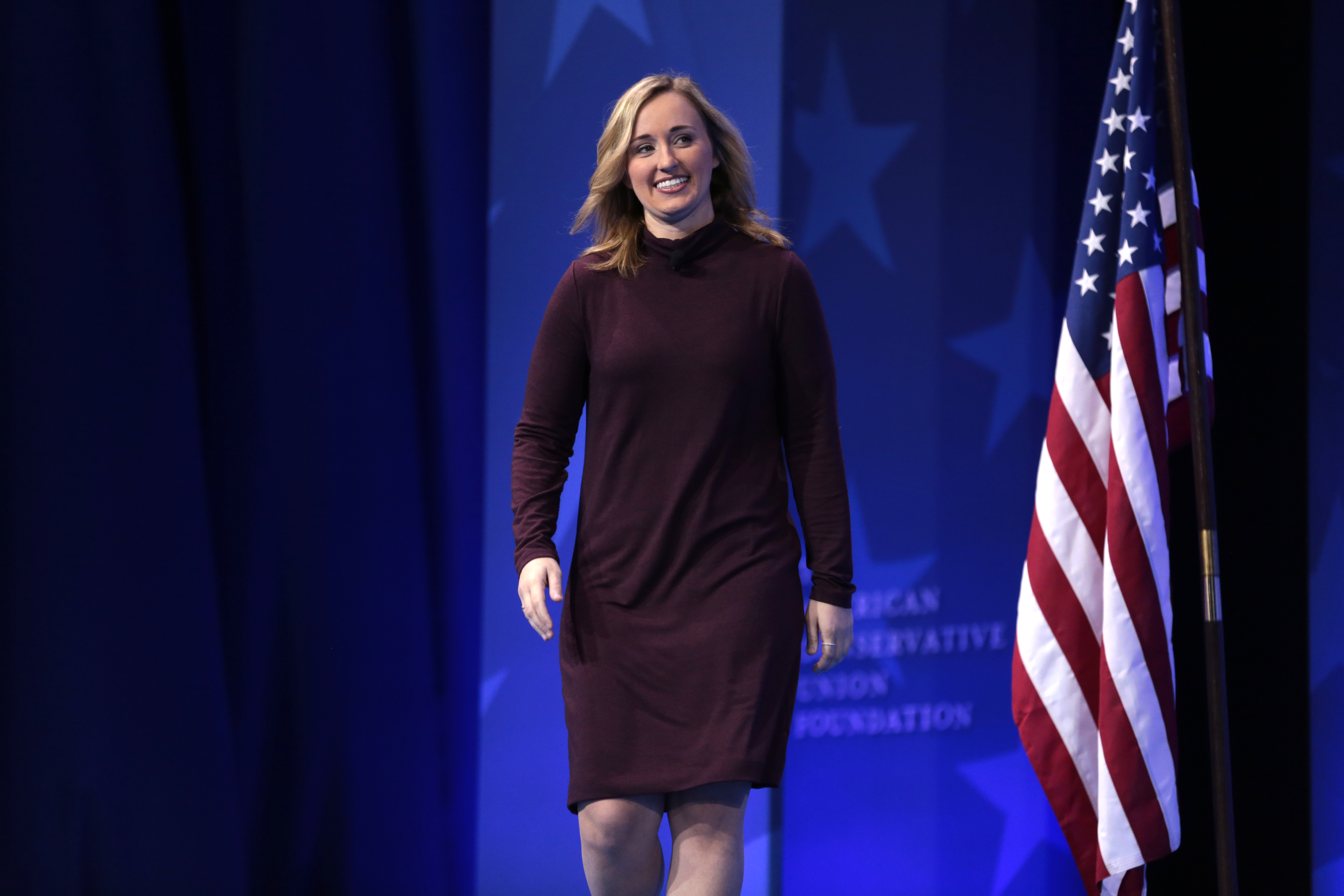
- Jashinsky in 2017
- Born: March 29, 1993 (age 33); Delafield, Waukesha County, Wisconsin, U.S.
- Education: George Washington University
- Occupation: Journalist
- Known for: Rising (until 2022); Breaking Points (since 2022)

Emily Jashinsky (born March 29, 1993) is an American journalist, commentator, and media critic known for her work in conservative media and political analysis. She is the D.C. correspondent for UnHerd, a co-host on Breaking Points, and hosts both After Party with Emily Jashinsky and Undercurrents podcasts.

== Early life and education ==
Emily Jashinsky was raised in Delafield, Wisconsin, in a "Christian conservative, hunting, fishing house." She attended the George Washington University, graduating in 2015 with a degree in political science and creative writing. While at GWU, Jashinsky was active in the Young America's Foundation (YAF), serving as president of the campus chapter. As president of the GW chapter, Jashinsky requested an exemption to "mandatory training sessions about LGBT issues for student leaders and faculty," saying they went against the group's Christian beliefs. Jashinsky also interned for Christina Hoff Sommers at the American Enterprise Institute, assisting with research and fact-checking for the re-release of "War Against Boys".

== Career ==
Jashinsky began her career as a spokeswoman for the YAF and as a commentary writer for the Washington Examiner. In 2018, Jashinsky joined The Federalist as culture editor and became the host of Federalist Radio Hour, conducting interviews with notable figures in politics and entertainment.

In 2021, Jashinsky co-hosted Rising Fridays with Ryan Grim for The Hill, after hosts Saagar Enjeti and Krystal Ball departed to start the Breaking Points platform. In September 2022, Jashinsky joined Breaking Points as co-host of Counter Points. In 2024, Jashinsky joined UnHerd as D.C. correspondent and began hosting the show "Undercurrents."

In June 2025, Jashinsky partnered with Megyn Kelly's MK Media network to launch the video podcast After Party with Emily Jashinsky. Jashinsky also hosts The Megyn Kelly Wrap-Up Show on SiriusXM, recapping Kelly's daily program with live caller interaction.

She has made guest appearances on major television news programs, including Fox News Sunday, Media Buzz and Washington Journal. Her writing has appeared in the Wall Street Journal, the Telegraph and the New York Post, as well as RealClearPolitics, among others.

In addition to her journalism work, Jashinsky serves as a senior fellow at the Independent Women's Forum and frequently teaches young journalists as part of the National Journalism Center, where she was director from 2020 to 2024. She is also involved with the Board of Governors of the National Journalism Center and YAF.

== Personal life ==
Jashinsky has identified as a Christian and describes her politics as generally conservative, saying that she is between the "Old Right" and "New Right." She has spoken publicly about media bias and the importance of transparency in journalism.
