= White Supremacy Culture =

1999 essay by Tema Okun

An illustration of characteristics of "white supremacy culture"

White Supremacy Culture is a 1999 essay by Tema Okun, an anti-racist educator, consultant, and social justice activist. In the essay, Okun proposes that certain values and behaviors—such as perfectionism, objectivity, and "worship of the written word"—are instantiations of white supremacy that may manifest in organizations and institutions, often unconsciously.

The essay and its notion of "white supremacy culture" have become influential in the diversity, equity, and inclusion (DEI) field, and have been used for diversity training by educational institutions, governments, progressive nonprofits, and other organizations. "White Supremacy Culture" has also attracted criticism regarding its validity, lack of supporting evidence, and potential to cause organizational dysfunction.

== History ==
Okun wrote the document in 1999 after attending what she described as a "frustrating and horrible" workshop, later saying: "I came home and I sat in front of the computer. And the article literally came through me onto the computer. It was not researched. I didn’t sit down and deliberate. It just came through me."

The essay was included as "The Characteristics of White Supremacy Culture" in the 2001 workbook Dismantling Racism: A Workbook for Social Change Groups, which Okun authored with her mentor Kenneth Jones. In 2010, Okun expanded on these ideas in her book The Emperor Has No Clothes: Teaching About Race and Racism to People Who Don't Want to Know. In May 2021, she published "White Supremacy Culture – Still Here" on her website, a revised version of the document which includes discussion of additional topics such as social class, capitalism, and Christian hegemony.

== Contents ==
In the essay, Okun lists various traits and characteristics that "promote white supremacy thinking" and are "used as norms and standards without being proactively named or chosen by the group... Because we all live in a white supremacy culture, these characteristics show up in the attitudes and behaviors of all of us – people of color and white people." She describes certain ways that these attitudes and behaviors can appear within an organization and suggests "antidotes" to counteract each one.

The 15 characteristics that Okun identifies as contributing to white supremacy culture are:

1. Perfectionism: Focusing more on mistakes and inadequacies than on things done correctly.
2. Sense of urgency: Emphasizing speed and immediate results at the cost of thoughtful reflection or long-term solutions.
3. Defensiveness: Attempting to "protect power as it exists" with hostility to new ideas and charges of racism.
4. Quantity over quality: Prioritizing "things that can be measured" over things that cannot, such as relationships and conflict resolution.
5. Worship of the written word: Elevating written documents as the authoritative form of sharing information.
6. Only one right way: Believing that there is only one correct way to do things, excluding diverse approaches and perspectives.
7. Paternalism: Obscuring the decision-making process from those without power in the organization.
8. Either/or thinking: Simplifying complex issues into binary categories, ignoring nuance.
9. Power hoarding: Viewing "power" as a finite quantity and feeling threatened when changes to the organization are suggested.
10. Fear of open conflict: Avoiding difficult conversations and using "politeness" as an excuse to sidestep conflict.
11. Individualism: Desiring individual recognition and valuing competition over collaboration.
12. I'm the only one: Thinking that work must be done by oneself (rather than delegating to others) in order to be done correctly.
13. Progress is bigger, more: Defining "success" as growth and expansion without regard for the quality of the organization's work.
14. Objectivity: Believing that it is possible to be objective or "neutral" while stigmatizing the display of emotion.
15. Right to comfort: Preserving the psychological comfort of those with power and scapegoating people who cause discomfort.

== Use by institutions ==
According to Okun, "White Supremacy Culture" gained attention after it was taken from her 2001 workbook and posted online. In 2020, Jacobin wrote that Okun's essay "has long circulated among left-leaning NGOs and racial justice groups", and that it was "also increasingly appearing within major corporations and public institutions." Ryan Grim of The Intercept said that the essay "began to be circulated widely in progressive spaces" in the late 2000s, and became pervasive in mainstream institutions following the 2020 murder of George Floyd.

"White Supremacy Culture" has been used or recommended as part of DEI and diversity training programs by organizations including the National Education Association, Washington University in St. Louis, the Society for Conservation Biology, the Washington State governor's office, the Minnesota Public Health Association, the Sierra Club of Wisconsin, Montgomery County Public Schools, the New York City Department of Education, the Seattle city government, the Yale School of Drama, the National Lawyers Guild, and the Los Angeles chapter of the Democratic Socialists of America. Academics have also used the essay as a framework to suggest how "white supremacy culture" is present in institutions such as university libraries, nonprofit organizations, and art museums.

Notable uses of the document include:

- In 2020, the Smithsonian Institution's National Museum of African American History and Culture published a graphic inspired by Okun's essay that listed traits such as "rational linear thinking" and "respect for authority" as elements of white culture. After criticism, the graphic was removed from the museum's website.
- In 2021, San Francisco Unified School District renamed its arts department from VAPA (Visual and Performing Arts) to SFUSD Arts Department, explaining that acronyms are a symptom of white supremacy culture because they "alienate those who may not speak English".
- In 2022, after the Oregon Health Authority delayed a meeting with third-party organizations, officials said that "urgency is a white supremacy value" and cited Okun's work.
- In a 2023 article for Literary Hub, author Helen Betya Rubinstein called copy editing a "white supremacist project" due to enacting values such as perfectionism and worship of the written word, as outlined in Okun's essay.

== Reception ==
The community organizing journal The Forge wrote in 2023 that "White Supremacy Culture" has "become ubiquitous across the progressive movement in recent years." In a roundtable discussion of racial justice leaders, participants generally agreed that the document could be more useful within activist communities than as a tool for organizational change; some reported seeing the essay misused, or criticized its definitions of white supremacy characteristics as essentialist. In another article for The Forge, Maurice Mitchell wrote that some progressive activists have used parts of Okun's essay out of context or uncritically "to challenge accountability around metrics and timeliness or the use of written language. Yet metrics and timeliness—and the ability to communicate in writing—are not in and of themselves examples of white supremacy."

In a 2019 editorial for Education Week, San Francisco middle school principal Joe Truss spoke positively about his school's attempt to "dismantle white supremacy culture" using Okun's work, writing, "We were able to get past defensiveness and excuses and get to the heart of the matter. Our courageous educators got personal, thinking about how White Supremacy Culture shows up in their personal lives and between colleagues." A 2023 study in the sociology journal Contexts found that after employees at the nonprofit Education for All (EFA) were introduced to the essay's concepts, "staff shifted how they talked about their workplace and the role of White supremacy within it, yet the workplace itself remained substantially unchanged. In fact, all the progressive DEI work did was help improve the image of EFA while still maintaining the benefits of Whiteness."

=== Criticism ===
From any normal standpoint, the idea that "requiring people to think in a linear (logical) fashion" is racist is itself racist. People of all ethnic backgrounds can think logically!

— Matthew Yglesias

Matthew Yglesias wrote in The Washington Post that while the goal of "White Supremacy Culture" may have been "to subvert and disrupt malign hierarchies", it could also be weaponized by employees to "disrupt the normal conduct of work, where goal-setting, urgency and avoiding mistakes are in fact important." Yglesias later expanded on this critique in a Substack post, writing that Okun "doesn’t put forward any evidence or arguments in favor of her claims". He argued that while many of the characteristics listed by Okun were negative, they had "literally nothing to do with race" and that the essay "instead comes from a place of extreme characterological aversion to hierarchy and structure."

Eric Levitz, in New York magazine, said that the essay "reads like a parody of progressive doctrine" and that it "has routinely sown dysfunction within progressive groups by inviting their members to see any assertion of objective fact, authority, or deadlines as a manifestation of racism." Levitz added that Okun "offers no framework for differentiating appropriate invocations of her concepts from abusive ones." He later wrote that "[t]o virtually all left-wing public intellectuals, Okun’s work is a joke."

Robby Soave, for Reason, called the essay "a body of dubious work that makes all sorts of unfounded and frankly racist assumptions." He wrote that traits such as defensiveness and perfectionism "can contribute to unpleasant work, school, and social environments. But there is nothing that connects them to whiteness."

In The New York Times, Jesse Singal said that "White Supremacy Culture" seemed to be "geared more toward sparking a revolutionary reunderstanding of race relations than solving organizations’ specific problems." Singal added that the work of Okun and other authors, such as Robin DiAngelo, could do more harm than good in diversity training by provoking backlash among subjects and worsening their bias. Ross Douthat, also in The New York Times, said that Okun had risen to "undeserved prominence in progressive thought and institutions" due to unfounded assumptions that her work had "some sort of respectable intellectual foundation."

=== Response from Okun ===
I think if people are trying to get around being responsible for themselves, or doing hard work, or living up to some agreed standard of excellence — if it’s not this tool, they’ll find another one.

— Tema Okun

In a 2023 interview with The Intercept, Okun said that "White Supremacy Culture" had been weaponized and misused in various settings by employees of various backgrounds—both people of color and white people—against their bosses. She clarified that the characteristics defined in the essay, such as perfectionism and worship of the written word, were distinct from standard organizational activities, such as performance reviews and writing reports.

Okun added that the essay was not intended as a "checklist" for evaluating behavior in order to conclude that someone is "a terrible person" or "a tool of white supremacy culture." She suggested that the document was useful as an "internal map" for assessing one's own behavior, and noted that her 2021 revision of the essay included more discussion of social class, including how "white supremacy targets white people in some of the same ways that it targets people of color."
