= Believe women =

American political slogan

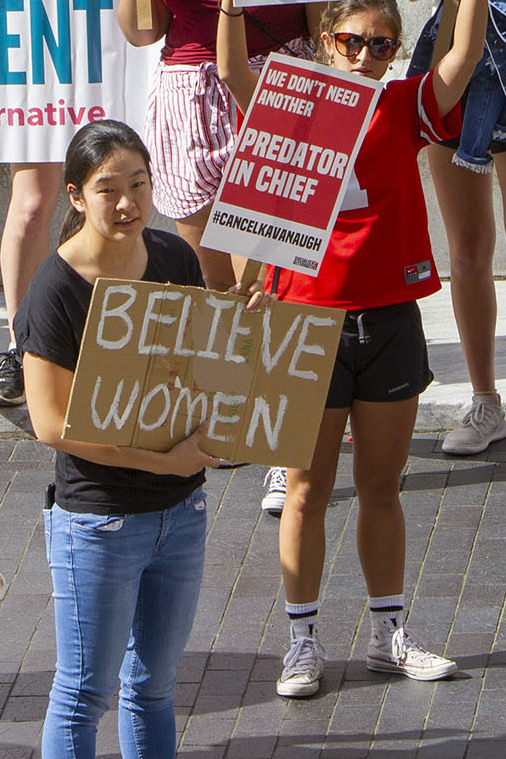
Protestors hold signs in protest against the Brett Kavanaugh Supreme Court nomination.

"Believe women" is an American political slogan arising out of the #MeToo movement. It refers to accepting women's allegations of sexual harassment or sexual assault at face value. The phrase grew in popularity in response to the Brett Kavanaugh Supreme Court nomination.

Jude Doyle, writing for Elle, argues that the phrase means "don't assume women as a gender are especially deceptive or vindictive, and recognize that false allegations are less common than real ones."

== Criticisms and "Believe all women" ==
Rebecca Traister, writing for The Cut, calls the phrase "compelling but flawed": it is often recast as "believe all women", and used as a "deeply problematic" and "clumsy imperative" that has "enfeebled the far more important argument that we should encourage them to speak more, and listen to them more seriously when they talk".

"Believe all women" is a controversial alternative phrasing of the expression. Monica Hesse writing for The Washington Post argues that the slogan has always been "believe women", and that the "believe all women" variant is "a bit of grammatical gaslighting", a straw man invented by critics so that it could be attacked, and that this alternative slogan, in contrast with "believe women", "is rigid, sweeping, and leaves little room for nuance". Libertarian journalist Robby Soave writing for Reason disagreed with this interpretation, arguing that "#MeToo advocates demanded a presumption of belief for every individual who claims to be a sexual misconduct victim: i.e., believe all women". He noted that Susan Faludi of The New York Times admitted to having "encountered some feminists who seemed genuinely to subscribe to the more extreme interpretation of the hashtag."

=== General criticisms ===
Using the recast "all women" variant of the slogan, Megan McArdle, a writer self-described as "right-leaning libertarian", suggested in a 2017 Bloomberg opinion column that the trend led to outcomes for those accused of sexual misconduct of the "economic death penalty" – termination of employment and effective blacklisting from their field – in incidents which McArdle viewed as not clearly established, or as involving less serious behaviors.

According to The Atlantic, the adoption of a rule in Britain, according to which police should believe reports of sexual assault and consider complainants to be victims, led to improper police investigation of claims and the overlooking of contradictory evidence, resulting in the collapse of prosecutions.

=== No Place in a Criminal Trial ===
In the latest acquittal of 5 Hockey Canada players, justice Maria Carroccia ruled that:

"Although the slogan “Believe the victim” has become popularized of late, it has no place in a criminal trial. To approach a trial with the assumption that the complainant is telling the truth is the equivalent of imposing a presumption of guilt on the person accused of sexual assault and then placing a burden on him to prove his innocence. That is antithetical to the fundamental principles of justice enshrined in our constitution and the values underlying our free and democratic society."

== Joe Biden sexual assault allegation ==
In April 2020, a number of politicians and commentators discussed the Joe Biden sexual assault allegation in relation to the "Believe women" slogan. Representative Alexandria Ocasio-Cortez criticized what she regarded as a lack of integrity relating to the issue: "If we again want to have integrity, you can't say, you know — both believe women, support all of this, until it inconveniences you, until it inconveniences us." The National Review criticized what it considered to be Biden's hypocrisy in "his demand that Americans must believe women as a matter of unwavering reflex" during the Kavanaugh nomination. The editors said, "we hope that this incident has taught Biden that his previous approach toward accusations of sexual assault was dangerous, illiberal, and ultimately untenable." On the other hand, Senator Kirsten Gillibrand stood by Biden and remarked, "When we say 'believe women', it's for this explicit intention of making sure there's space for all women to come forward to speak their truth, to be heard. And in this allegation, that is what Tara Reade has done."

== Use in media ==
On September 28, 2018, Bumble took out a full-page advertisement in The New York Times saying simply, "Believe women".

== See also ==
- 2017–18 United States political sexual scandals
- Believe the Children
- False accusation of rape
- HimToo movement
- Potiphar's wife
