= Kidnapping of Romi Gonen =

Israeli taken hostage by Hamas

Romi Gonen
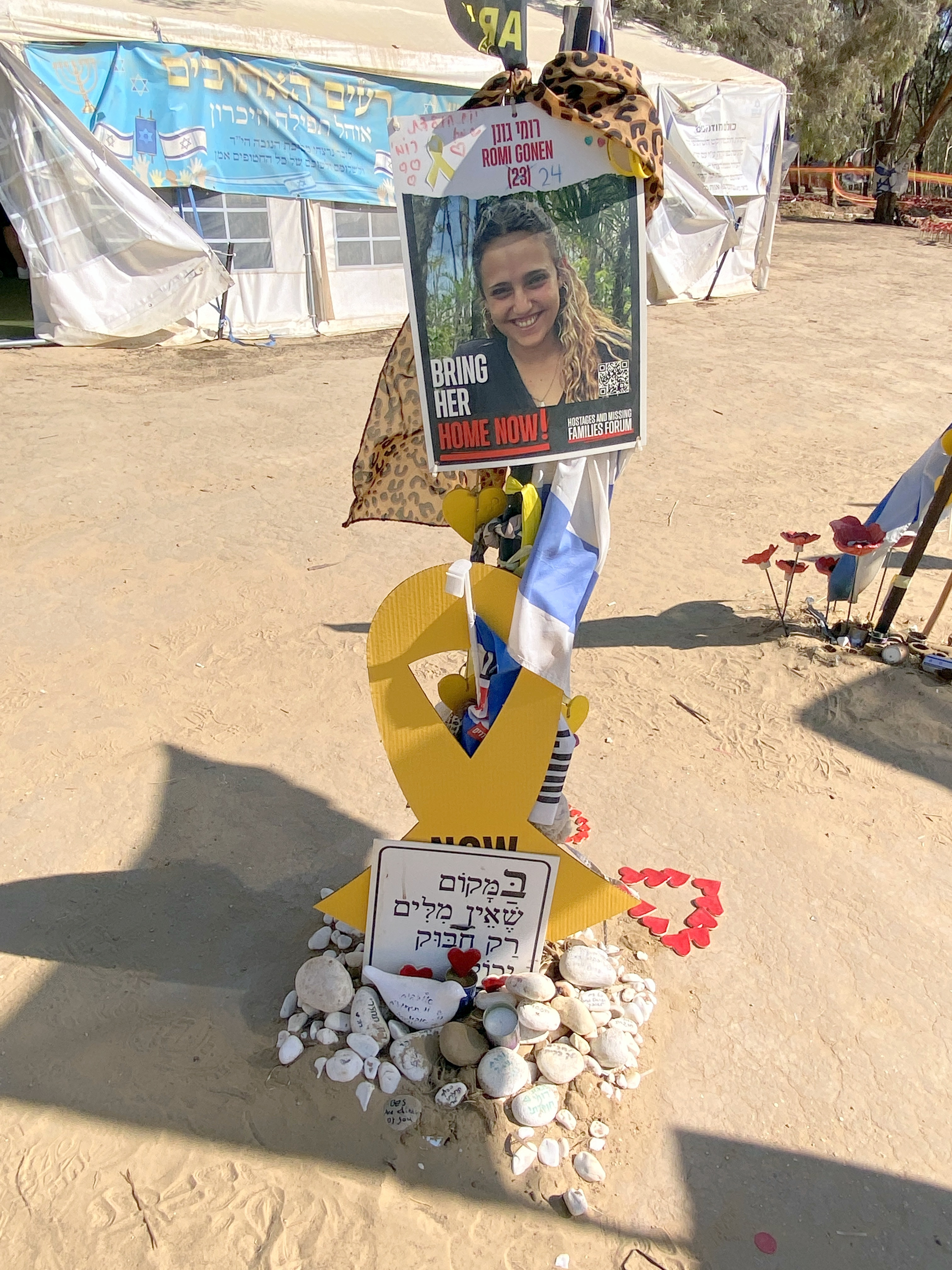
- A post featuring Gonen's hostage poster at the Nova Festival Victims Memorial
- Born: 18 August 2000 (age 26); Holon, Israel
- Known for: Her abduction to Gaza during the Nova festival massacre

Romi Gonen is an Israeli woman who was abducted by Hamas on 7 October 2023 during the Nova music festival massacre. She was released after 471 days in captivity as part of the January 2025 Gaza war ceasefire. Gonen reported that she was sexually assaulted multiple times during her captivity.

== Early life ==
Romi Gonen was born on 18 August 2000 to Eitan Gonen and Meirav Leshem Gonen. She has four siblings: Yarden, Shachaf, Daria, and Adam. She lived in Kfar Vradim. When Gonen was in middle school, she received dance lessons from Etai Peri, who later joined Vertigo.

== Kidnapping ==
Gonen arrived at the Nova Music Festival at 4:38 AM. Gonen was abducted as she tried to escape the Nova music festival when it was targeted by the militant group as part of the 7 October 2023 attack. Gonen's mother and sister said they spent nearly five hours speaking to Gonen as militants attacked the Nova music festival. Gonen while on the phone, told her family that roads clogged with abandoned cars made escape impossible and that she would seek shelter in some bushes. Gonen, her best friend, Gaya Halifa, and Ofir Tzarfati were evacuated from the Nova Music Festival by Ben Shimoni. However, the group was ambushed, with Shimoni and Halifa being killed, while Gonen and Tzarfati were wounded and abducted. Gonen was badly injured after being shot in her arm. Gonen managed to call to her mother at 10:15 AM. During the phone call, Gonen told her mother “They shot me, Mom, and I'm bleeding.” Gonen remained on the phone with her mother until Gonen was abducted at 10:58 AM. Gonen was pulled out of the car by her hair before being punched in the face. During her kidnapping, Gonen's family was able to trace her phone signal to Gaza.

Her family did not know if Gonen was still alive until they heard from released hostages that Romi had been held with them. One of the hostages released in November 2023 told Gonen's family that Romi was alive, but her hand was in a bad condition.

== Captivity ==
During Gonen's first day in captivity, she briefly met Emily Damari at Al-Shifa Hospital. They would be reunited in a tunnel 39 days later, and would spend the remaining 431 days of their captivity together. The two formed an extremely close bond, and Gonen who had received paramedic training before her abduction, helped treat Damari's injuries. Gonen and Damari were held as human shields for Izz al-Din Al-Haddad for 35 days. During her captivity, Gonen lost 10 kilograms (22 pounds) and was held in tunnels and apartments.

=== Sexual abuse in captivity ===
On 25 December 2025, Gonen sat down with Channel 12’s Uvda for her first post-captivity interview, where she recounted multiple instances of sexual abuse by four different captors. Gonen reported that the first assault happened on her fourth day in captivity, and the abuser was a doctor tasked with caring for her injuries sustained during her abduction by Hamas. Gonen said the second attack was by a cameraman who filmed clips of her for propaganda. Gonen said the worst assault happened while she was trying to go to the bathroom. Gonen said after the bathroom assault her captor put a gun to her head and threatened to kill her if she told anyone. According to her account, she was later moved to an underground cell, where a number of other female hostages were soon moved as well, and she learned from conversations with them that she had been the only one among them who had been sexually abused. After one of the guards learned from another female hostage about the worst assault, Gonen was interrogated by three Hamas officers. She stated in the interview that the officers initially accused her of lying, but later asked her to repeat her account in a telephone conversation with a senior Hamas commander, who she subsequently found out was Izz al-Din Al-Haddad. Gonen reported in the interview that Al-Haddad promised her to find the attacker and told her that if she remained silent about having been sexually assaulted in captivity, she would be prioritized for release in a deal.

== Efforts to release ==
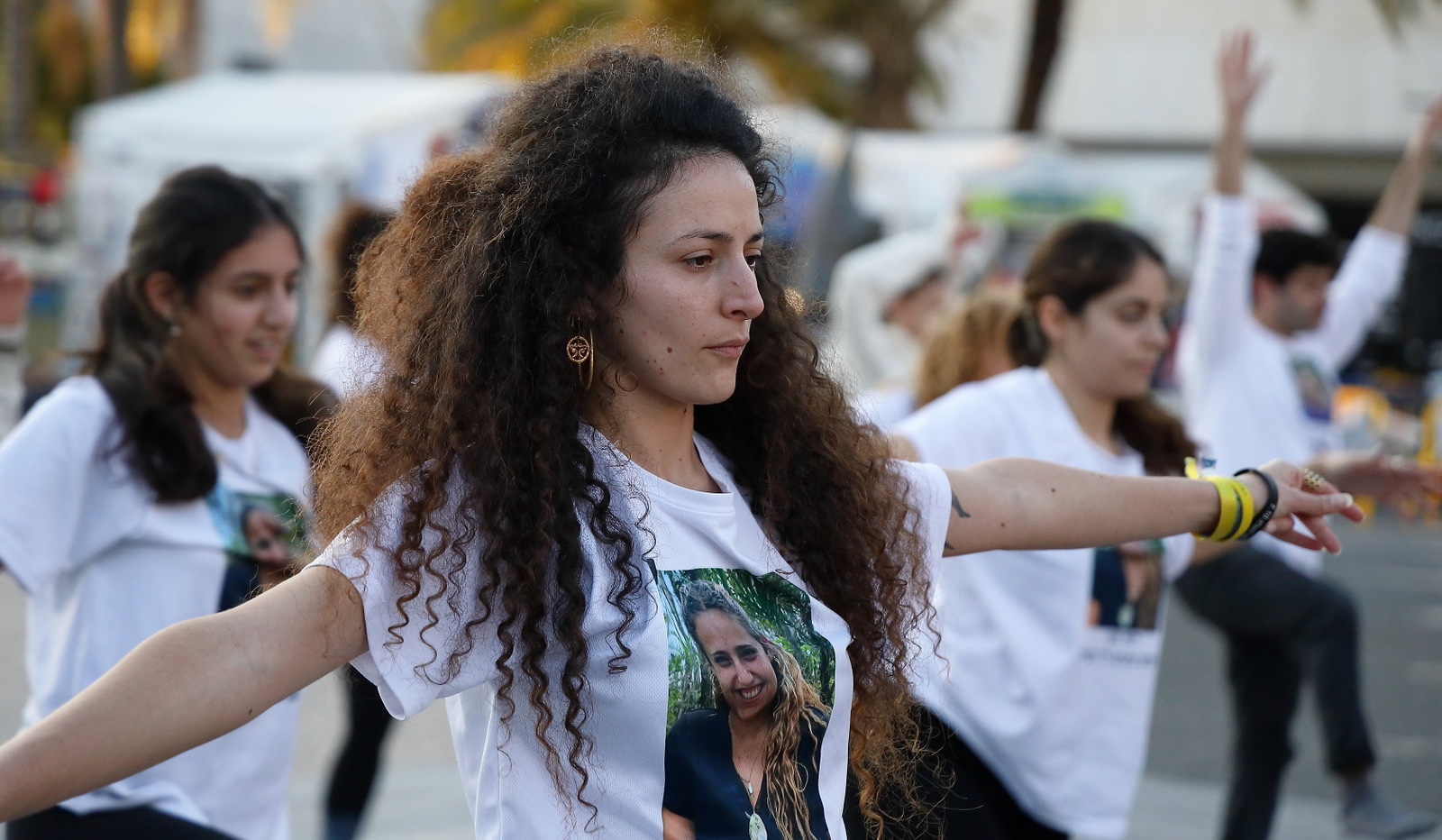
Yarden Gonen at a "Dancing for Romi" event in Hostages Square.

Gonen's mother, Meirav, was one of the most outspoken voices advocating for the return of the hostages, where she appeared nearly daily on Israeli news programs. During Gonen's captivity, her family started an initiative where people would wear leopard print on Wednesdays in honor of Gonen.

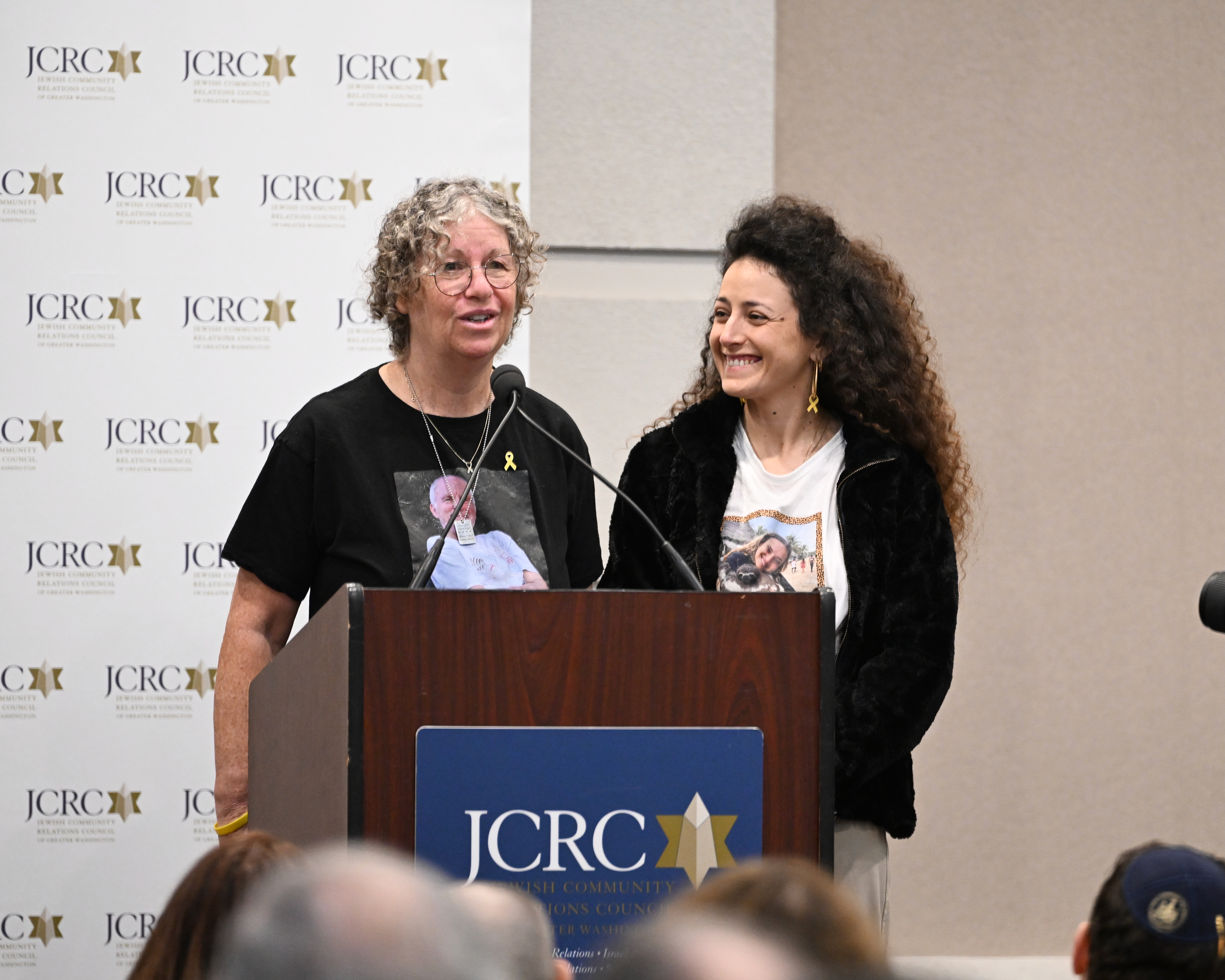
Aviva Siegel and Yarden Gonen speaking at an event in December 2024

In December 2023, Gonen's grandmother, Dvora Leshem, knocked on the doors of a different minister each night during Hanukkah. During the holiday, Leshem knocked on the doors of Amir Ohana, Yoav Gallant, Benny Gantz, Tzachi Hanegbi, Aryeh Deri, Benjamin Netanyahu, Yuli Edelstein, and Isaac Herzog. Leshem, who was born in Iran, also recorded a video requesting for Ayatollah Ali Khameini and Iranian President Ebrahim Raisi to help secure her granddaughter's release.

In June 2024, political commentator Briahna Joy Gray was fired from The Hill after rolling her eyes at Romi's sister, Yarden, after Yarden told Gray to "believe Israeli women." Later that month, Meirav Leshen Gonen spoke in front of the UN Humans Rights Council, which she criticized for releasing a COI report that did not adequately address sexual violence faced by Israelis on October 7th and as hostages.

== Release ==
Video of Gonen, Damari, and Steinbrecher being handed over from the Red Cross to the IDF.

Video of Gonen's family reacting to her release

Romi Gonen was released along with Emily Damari and Doron Steinbrecher in January 2025. After Gonen's release she has had two surgeries on her hand since captivity. Gonen was discharged from the hospital in July 2025, after spending half a year undergoing rehabilitation and two operations to treat the gunshot wound in her arm.

In August 2025, one of Gonen's captors, Hazem Awni Naeem, was killed in an IDF airstrike.

== Post release activities ==
In March 2025, Damari and Gonen were honored before a soccer match featuring Maccabi Tel Aviv F.C. and Hapoel Haifa F.C., with Gonen getting to visit Hapoel Haifa's locker room before the match. Gonen's father condemned the Maccabi Haifa football team and a group of their fans in January 2026 after a sexually suggestive banner was displayed during the Haifa derby, showing a woman that strongly resembled Gonen.

In January 2026, Damari and Gonen joined the broadcasting team and were featured on a program of the Israeli Army Radio's music station. During the feature the two spoke about when they and their captors learned about the death of the then leader of Hamas, Yahya Sinwar.

== See also ==
- List of kidnappings (2020–present)
- List of solved missing person cases (2020s)
