= Niall Stanage =

Irish journalist and associate editor

- Born: 18 June 1974 (age 51); Belfast, Northern Ireland
- Occupation: editor

Niall Stanage (born 18 June 1974) is an Irish journalist and associate editor of the American political newspaper The Hill.

== Biography ==
Stanage was born in 1974 in Belfast, Northern Ireland, and attended Carryduff Primary School and Methodist College Belfast. He describes his upbringing thus: "I was the product of a family that identified primarily as Irish rather than British – and that was nominally Protestant, yet in reality secular". He went on to read English at St Edmund Hall, Oxford, graduating in 1995. In the 1990s, he performed casually as a singer-songwriter, playing acoustic guitar and harmonica at various live gigs across Ireland and Britain.

Stanage is a former editor of Magill and a regular contributor to the New York Observer, while also covering the United States for The Sunday Business Post. He has written for Salon, The Wall Street Journal, The Guardian and the Irish Independent, among other publications. He is a frequent guest on The Stand with Eamon Dunphy podcast. He is currently Associate Editor of The Hill. As of 2025, he is a presenter on Rising.

In The Guardian in 2006, Stanage argued in opposition to George Monbiot, who had written that the Iraqi insurgency was comparable to the IRA:

The left in Britain and elsewhere has been appallingly lax in failing to face up to the reality of this religious fascism. Those who take their inspiration from Zarqawi and his ilk have no truck with anything as worldly as elections. Their murderous mandate, they assert, comes straight from God. Whatever one's view of the later Provisional IRA campaign in Northern Ireland, the IRA's struggle in the war of independence was clearly legitimate. It was built upon the people's desires as expressed at the polls.

Stanage wrote Redemption Song: An Irish Reporter Inside the Obama Campaign, which was officially released on 1 December 2008. This was one of the first books published anywhere to cover the entirety of Barack Obama's 2008 campaign for the Presidency of the United States.
