= Briahna Joy Gray =

American political consultant (born 1985)

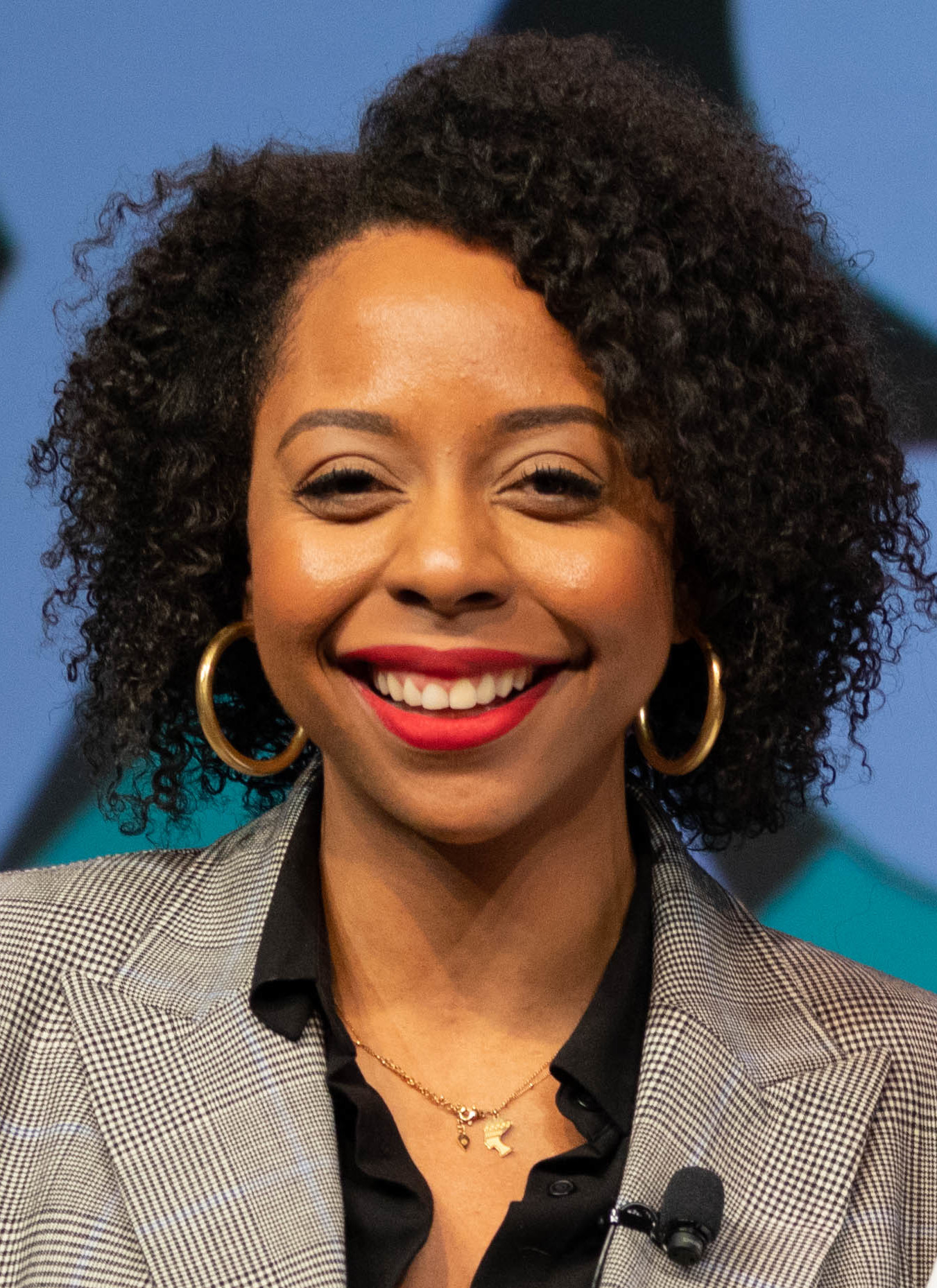
- Gray in 2019
- Born: August 15, 1985 (age 41); Washington, D.C., United States
- Education: Harvard University (BA, JD)
- Occupations: Lawyer; Political consultant; Writer; Political commentator
- Employers: The Intercept (2018–2019); Current Affairs (2020–2023); The Hill (2022–2024)
- Political party: Independent
- Other political affiliations: Green; Democratic Socialists of America

Briahna Joy Gray (born August 15, 1985) is an American political commentator, lawyer, and political consultant. After writing for The Intercept in 2018 she started her political career as the National Press Secretary for the Bernie Sanders 2020 presidential campaign. She was the co-host of The Hill's web program Rising from September 2022 to June 2024, when she was fired following a tense interview with a sister of Romi Gonen, an Israeli hostage of Hamas. She is the host of the Bad Faith podcast.

== Early life and education ==
Briahna Joy Gray was born on August 15, 1985, in Washington, D.C., to Reuben Gray and Leslie Fair-Gray, both of whom were teachers. Although initially raised in North Carolina, Gray spent time in Saudi Arabia and Kenya while her parents taught at international schools in those countries. In February 2001, while driving in Nairobi, Gray's father sustained fatal injuries in a car accident involving an American diplomat.

Gray earned a Bachelor of Arts degree from Harvard University and a Juris Doctor from Harvard Law School.

== Career ==
After graduating from law school, Gray worked as a corporate litigator in New York City for Dewey Pegno & Kramarsky LLP and Stroock & Stroock & Lavan. She was also the host of Someone's Wrong on the Internet, a podcast that covers politics and pop culture. Gray was hired by The Intercept in 2018, and has also written columns for Rolling Stone, Current Affairs, The Guardian, and New York Magazine. Gray supported Bernie Sanders 2016 presidential campaign and joined his 2020 campaign as his National Press Secretary. Gray has stated that she voted for Green Party candidate Jill Stein in the 2016 presidential election.

In 2020, Gray was included in Fortune magazine's "40 Under 40" listing under the "Government and Politics" category. On April 13, 2020, after Bernie Sanders dropped out of the 2020 Democratic Party presidential primary, Gray stated on Twitter that she did not endorse the presumptive Democratic presidential nominee Joe Biden. In response, Bernie Sanders distanced himself from her saying: "She is my former press secretary – not on the payroll." Since Sanders' 2020 Democratic primary campaign ended, Gray returned to her role as contributing editor at Current Affairs in addition to hosting the Bad Faith podcast, co-founded with Virgil Texas from Chapo Trap House. Gray supported the "Force the Vote" effort organized by Jimmy Dore to pressure left-wing Democratic representatives to withhold their votes for Nancy Pelosi for Speaker of the House at the start of the 117th Congress in order to pressure House Democrats into passing a Medicare for All bill. Gray was critical of Alexandria Ocasio-Cortez and the Squad for not supporting "Force the Vote."

From September 2022 to June 7, 2024, she co-hosted The Hill's YouTube program Rising opposite Robby Soave. Mike Roe of The Wrap noted: "Gray has been a controversial figure, particularly due to her comments about the conflict between Israel and Hamas and the Gaza war." In May 2024, she took part in the Dissident Dialogues Festival in Brooklyn, New York, debating whether Israel's war in Gaza is just. During the event, she said: "When Hamas is talking about eliminating Israel, it's talking about not killing all of the Jews. It's about eliminating the idea of a Jewish state — ending a Jewish state, ending an ethno-nationalist state and having a state more like what we have in the United States of America." Gray's comments were condemned by Democratic Representative Ritchie Torres, from New York's 15th congressional district. Gray was repeatedly jeered at by the audience for her criticisms of Israel. The New Republic reported that after the debate she told the moderator, podcaster Konstantin Kisin: "This is the most Islamophobic, racist audience I've ever seen. It's disgusting. I hope someone drops a bomb on this entire building."

On June 4, 2024, Yarden Gonen, the sister of Israeli hostage Romi Gonen, was interviewed on Gray's Rising show. Wrapping up the discussion, Gray said:

I'm just going to push back against [Gonen's] implication that in Michigan which has the largest Muslim and Arab population in America that there is any threat of terrorism from our own people, and I would like to clarify also that one of the rationale [sic] that was presented for 9/11 was disgust with America's support of Israel's continued occupation of Palestine--so that's neither here nor there. I really do hope that Netanyahu agrees and Israel agrees to the ceasefire deal that could bring all the hostages including your sister home, and I'm sure many people watching are praying for her safety.

To which Yarden Gonen responded, referring to sexual and gender-based violence in the October 7 attacks:

Thank you, me too, and I really hope that you [Gray] specifically will believe women when they say that they got hurt.

Gray rolled her eyes and interrupted Gonen to thank her for her appearance and to end the segment. Gray's actions were met with backlash, as she was viewed as being dismissive towards the families of the hostages. Gray was fired from Rising the following day. In response, Gray said: "The Hill has a clear pattern of suppressing speech — particularly when it's critical of the state of Israel. This is why they fired @kthalps, & it was only a matter of time before they fired me."

== Views ==
=== Democratic party ===
Gray has repeatedly criticized the Democratic Party, arguing that the party's pro-establishment leanings and funding from real estate lobbies, health insurance lobbies, the military-industrial complex, etc., have contributed to its recent electoral failure. Gray said that presidential candidate Kamala Harris lost the 2024 election because she failed to back an arms embargo on Israel.

Gray compared Bernie Sanders to a sheep dog who herds progressives into the Democratic Party, and expressed apprehension for the mayoralty of Zohran Mamdani, citing his retrenchment of progressive policies like defunding the police.

Gray has called the Democratic Party and liberalism at large a "moral void".

=== Healthcare ===
After Luigi Mangione's killing of Brian Thompson, Gray said that Thompson was responsible for tens of thousands of deaths as CEO of UnitedHealthcare, acts of "corporate genocide". Her comments drew criticism from New York congressman Ritchie Torres, whom she later called a "baby killing Zionist coward".

=== Labor ===
In response to a general strike proposal by Chicago mayor Brandon Johnson after the October 2025 No Kings Protests, Gray said she opposed the proposed action. She argued against "non-disruptive" protests permitted by the government, and said that No Kings protests had "fallen flat".
