= Breaking Points =

American political and news podcast

- Genre: Political news and commentary
- Format: Video; audio
- Language: English

Cast and voices
- Hosted by: Krystal Ball; Saagar Enjeti; Ryan Grim; Emily Jashinsky; Griffin Davis

Production
- Length: 60-120 minutes

Publication
- Original release: June 7, 2021 – present

Related

YouTube information
- Channel: Breaking Points
- Subscribers: 2.05 million
- Views: 1.215 billion
- Last updated: June 1, 2026

Breaking Points with Krystal and Saagar (or simply Breaking Points) is an American political and news video podcast hosted by Krystal Ball, Saagar Enjeti, Ryan Grim, Emily Jashinsky, and Griffin Davis. It was launched in June 2021 by Ball and Enjeti, both former hosts of Rising on The Hill, with Grim, Jashinsky, and Davis joining as rotational hosts later. Breaking Points is published on YouTube, Rumble, Apple Podcasts, iHeartRadio, and Spotify.

== Format ==
Breaking Points features commentary of political news and current events and in-studio interviews with journalists, politicians, and other political or cultural figures. Ball and Enjeti, the primary hosts, usually publish on Mondays, Tuesdays, and Thursdays and usually appear in-studio, while the secondary hosts Ryan Grim and Emily Jashinsky appear on Wednesdays, also in-studio. On Friday episodes the show has a more informal format with the hosts appearing remotely from their homes. Since 2025 producer Griffin Davis has appeared on Friday episodes, serving as moderator. Typically the show has a host with more left-leaning progressive views (Ball, Grim) paired up with a host with more right-leaning populist views (Enjeti, Jashinsky) to provide point-counterpoint debate on the selected topics, giving viewers thoughts and opinions from multiple sides of the story.

The hosts have editorial control over the show, which has the look and immediacy of live news broadcasting but with independent, populist messaging. Unlike The Hill, which has a full-time staff of 30, Breaking Points has a small crew of mainly part-time hourly contractors. Most of the show's revenue comes from premium subscribers, with some additional revenue from YouTube and podcast ads. In 2022 their expenses were said to be around $1 million per year.

== History ==
On May 28, 2021, Ball and Enjeti announced their departure from The Hill's Rising. The Breaking Points program and channel launched at YouTube on June 7, 2021, and reached 285,000 channel subscribers by June 11. Ball and Enjeti spoke about the subtle pressure they experienced working under The Hill's corporate umbrella and their dislike of working in a corporate bureaucracy. In September 2022, former Rising hosts Ryan Grim and Emily Jashinsky joined Breaking Points. They serve as replacement hosts when Ball and Enjeti are unavailable and host their own show, Counter Points, on Wednesdays (though as of 2026 Wednesday shows do not use the Counter Points nameplate.)

== Reception ==
In March 2026, Breaking Points was the 16th-most popular podcast on YouTube in the United States and the 72nd-most popular podcast on Spotify in the United States.

Breaking Points was awarded Best Political podcast at the 2026 iHeartPodcast Awards.
