= Katie Halper =

American comedian, writer, filmmaker, and political commentator

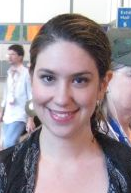
- Halper in 2008
- Born: Katherine Rose Halper; July 11, 1980 or 1981 (age 45–46); New York City, U.S.
- Education: Wesleyan University
- Occupations: Comedian; writer; journalist; filmmaker; podcaster; political commentator; teacher
- Years active: 2004–present
- Known for: The Katie Halper Show; Useful Idiots
- Website: katiehalper.com

Katherine Rose Halper (born July 11, 1980/1981) is an American comedian, writer, filmmaker, podcaster, and political commentator. She is the host of the podcast The Katie Halper Show and co-host of the podcast Useful Idiots with Aaron Maté.

== Early life and education ==
Halper was born in New York City, and grew up on Riverside Drive on the Upper West Side of Manhattan. Her father is a psychiatrist and her mother is an English professor and novelist. She is of Ashkenazi Jewish ancestry and has described herself as a secular Jew.

She graduated from the Dalton School, and from Wesleyan University in 2003.

== Career ==
After graduating from Wesleyan, Halper worked as development director for the Downtown Community Television Center (DCTV), a nonprofit media education center and documentary production house. She also coordinated living wage and labor campaigns in New York City and Florida. Halper has also taught history at her alma mater, the Dalton School.

=== Comedy ===
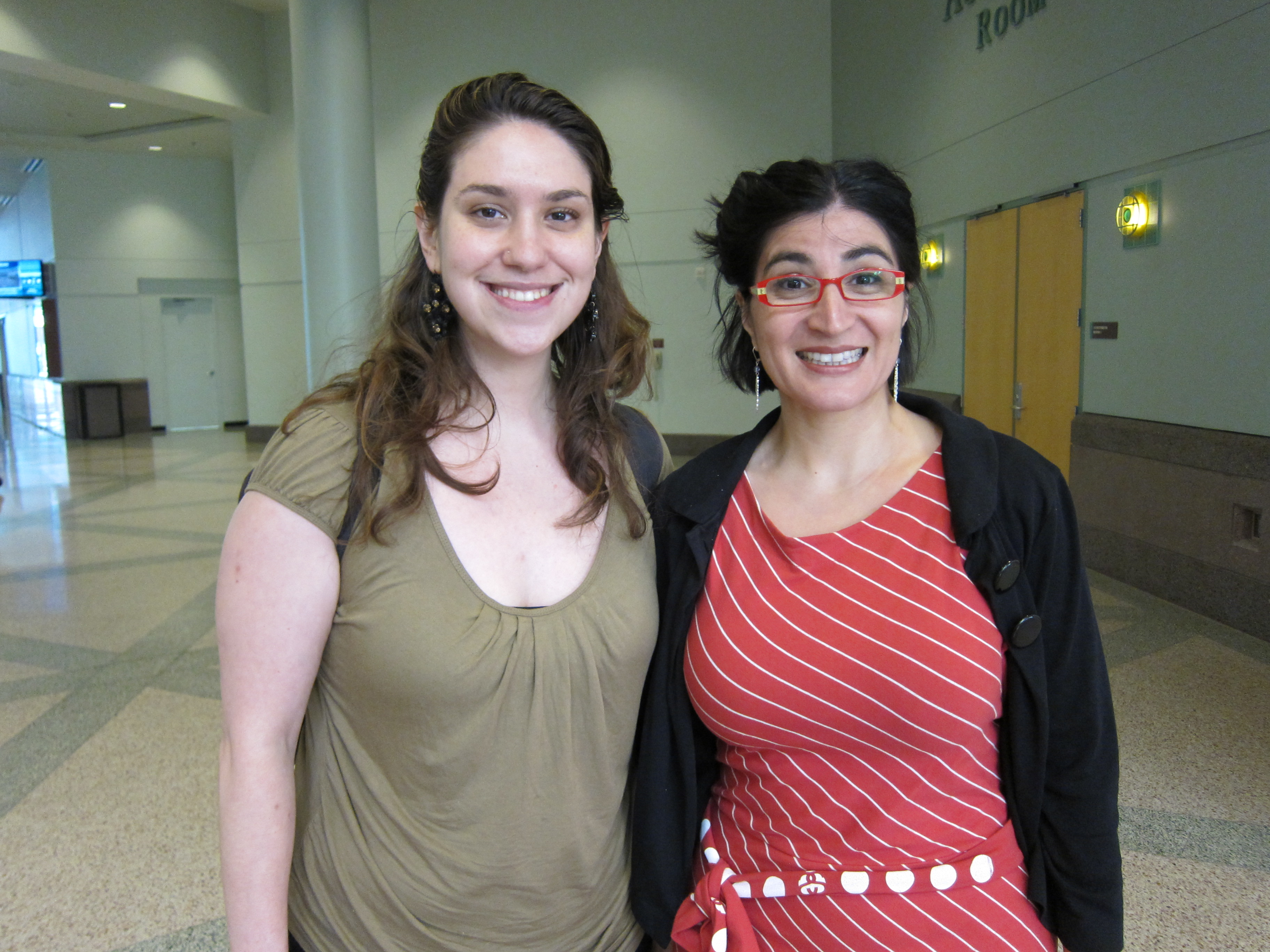
Katie Halper and Negin Farsad at Netroots Nation 2011

Halper began her career performing as a stand-up comedian. She has performed comedy at venues including Symphony Space, The Culture Project in New York, the Edinburgh Fringe Festival, the D.C. Comedy Festival, and at Netroots Nation. She also performed on the annual Seminar Cruise of The Nation magazine. She has performed with Lizz Winstead, Markos Moulitsas, The Yes Men, Cynthia Nixon, and Jim Hightower.

=== Political activism ===
Halper is a national director of Living Liberally and the co-founder of Laughing Liberally, both of which promote political action through social interaction.

=== Film ===
Halper was outreach director for Avi Lewis and Naomi Klein's documentary The Take (2004). The documentary is about a workers' movement in Buenos Aires, Argentina and was shown at the Toronto International Film Festival, Venice Film Festival, and Film Forum.

Halper's first film as director was entitled La Memoria es Vaga (2005), a documentary about the Valle de los Caídos and historical memory in post-Franco Spain. It was screened in the United States and Spain. Halper was co-producer of Tim Robbins and the DCTV film Embedded Live (also 2005), based on Robbins' play of the same name. Embedded Live was shown at the Venice Film Festival and Sundance Channel. She was associate producer of Estela Bravo's Free to Fly: The US-Cuba Link (2004), about restrictions on travel between Cuba and the United States. Free to Fly was shown at the Havana Film Festival and Los Angeles Latino International Film Festival. Halper directed and produced the film Commie Camp (2013). Commie Camp, originally entitled Another Camp Is Possible, is a documentary about Camp Kinderland, the Jewish summer camp where Halper went and her mother and grandmother worked. She also co-directed Facing Fascism: New Yorkers Remember the Spanish Civil War, a video for an exhibit at the Museum of the City of New York.

=== Commentary ===
Articles by Halper have been published in The New York Times, Comedy Central, The Nation, Gawker, The Huffington Post, Alternet, Daily Kos, OpenLeft, The Raw Story, Jacobin, Salon, Vice, The Guardian, and Feministing, where she was a guest columnist.

She has been featured as a commentator on MSNBC, The Young Turks, RT, Fox News Channel's The Ingraham Angle, The Hill's Rising, The New York Times, New York Magazine, Los Angeles Times, In These Times, Jezebel, Gawker, MSNBC's Countdown with Keith Olbermann, The Sam Seder Show, The Marc Maron Show, Sirius Radio, WBAI, XM Radio's P.O.T.U.S., and The Alan Colmes Show.

In September 2022, Rising refused to air a segment on their show in which Halper called Israel an "apartheid government". She was subsequently fired from the show.

=== Podcasting ===
Halper was co-host of the podcast and YouTube program Morning Jew with Heather Gold. She hosts The Katie Halper Show, a weekly WBAI radio show and podcast. The show received attention when, during an interview with Halper that was released as a podcast on March 25, 2020, Tara Reade, a former Senate staff assistant of Joe Biden, alleged that Biden sexually assaulted her in a Capitol Hill office building in 1993. A Biden spokesperson said that the allegation was false.

In 2019, Halper and Matt Taibbi launched and have since co-hosted the podcast Useful Idiots, which was distributed by Rolling Stone. The podcast has since featured interviews with Tulsi Gabbard, Ro Khanna, Andrew Yang, Bernie Sanders, Michael Moore, Tim Robbins, Glenn Greenwald, Norman Finkelstein, Aaron Maté, Dennis Kucinich, Noam Chomsky, Adam McKay, Lowkey, Rashida Tlaib, and Roger Waters. In March 2021, Taibbi announced that Useful Idiots would no longer be released by Rolling Stone and would instead be moving to Substack. In January 2022, Taibbi announced a sabbatical leave to write a book, and that in his absence Aaron Maté would fill in for him.

== Filmography ==
- Free to Fly: The US-Cuba Link (2004) — Associate producer
- Embedded Live (2005) — Co-producer
- La Memoria es Vaga (2005) — Director, producer
- Commie Camp (2013) — Director, producer
