= Joe Biden sexual misconduct allegation =

2020 sexual misconduct allegation

Tara Reade
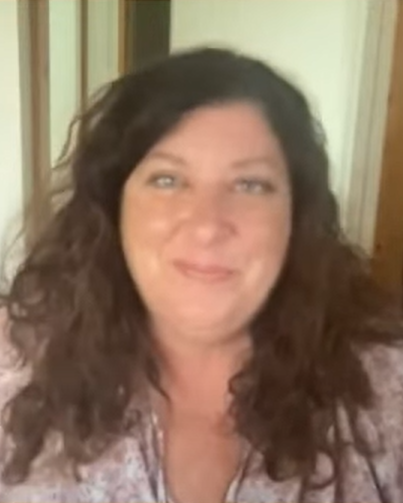
- Reade in 2021
- Born: Tara Reade Moulton; February 26, 1964 (age 62); Monterey County, California, U.S.
- Other name: Alexandra McCabe
- Education: Antioch University; Seattle University (JD)
- Occupation: Writer
- Children: 1

In March 2020, during that year's election campaign for President of the United States, congressional aide Tara Reade alleged that Democratic nominee Joe Biden had sexually assaulted her in 1993 in a Capitol Hill office building when she was a staff assistant in his office. Biden denied Reade's allegation.

Reade worked for Biden as a Congressional aide in 1992 and 1993, and later attended Antioch University and Seattle University School of Law. She later worked as a domestic violence advocate. She said she suffered emotional and violent physical abuse from both her father and ex-husband, which motivated her to work on behalf of victims. Reade misrepresented herself and her life experiences on numerous occasions, including lying under oath and in court proceedings. For example, she falsely claimed to hold a bachelor's degree from Antioch University.

Before accusing Biden of sexual assault in 2020, Reade made other comments that cast her encounters with Biden differently. In April 2019, Reade said that she filed a complaint in 1993 against Biden with a Senate human resources office, in which she alleged that Biden had made her feel uncomfortable through comments she deemed demeaning, allegedly including a compliment about her looks and a request for Reade to serve drinks at a Senate event. However, in her complaint, Reade did not accuse Biden of any kind of sexual misconduct and made no mention of the alleged assault.

In May 2023, Reade defected to Russia to seek Russian citizenship, citing security concerns. She announced this during an interview with Sputnik in Moscow alongside activist Maria Butina. Reade said that she felt safe in Moscow.

== Background ==
Joe Biden (1993)

Tara Reade, née Tara Reade Moulton, born 26 February 1964, lived in Nevada County, California. She changed her legal surname to McCabe for protection in 1998 because of domestic violence. Reade did advocacy work for domestic violence victims, first in Washington state and later in California. In early 2020, she worked part time with families with special-needs children in Nevada County. She earned a Seattle University Juris Doctor in 2004, but has not practiced law. She held positions and did volunteer work for county governmental agencies and for private nonprofits, performing duties in such areas as victims advocacy or animal rescue.

Reade worked as a staff assistant in Biden's U.S. Senate office from December 1992 to August 1993, when she was in her late twenties. "Over the years, Reade spoke favorably about working for Biden", reported the Associated Press in 2020. A few years before she accused Biden of sexual assault, Reade repeatedly praised Biden on her personal Twitter account, retweeting or otherwise endorsing comments which characterized Biden as a leader in combating sexual violence. CNN reported in 2020 that, "In more recent years, Reade has praised Biden on social media on numerous occasions." When CNN asked her why, she said she feels conflicted about him, liking what he did politically for women's issues and saying that "many things are true at once".

Reade was one of several women who accused Biden in 2019 of "physical contact that made them feel uncomfortable, such as unwanted hugs, kisses on the head, and standing uncomfortably close", according to ABC News.

Reade, a Democrat who supported various candidates other than Biden during the 2020 primaries, said that her various allegations against Biden were not politically motivated. Reade released her memoir, Left Out: When the Truth Doesn't Fit In, in October 2020.

=== The Union articles of 2019 ===
On April 4, 2019, Reade contacted The Union, a local newspaper in Grass Valley, California, about her employment working for Joe Biden. Her position as a staff assistant in his Senate office in Washington, D.C., gave her responsibilities for the office's intern program and mail delivery. She alleged that Biden "used to put his hand on [her] shoulder and run his finger up [her] neck". Reade also told of another incident, in which, she alleged, members of Biden's staff, whom she did not name, argued about whether she should serve drinks at an event; Reade said that she heard from staff that Biden wanted her to do so because he liked her legs. Reade said after she had declined this assignment, she was admonished by Biden's office manager, Marianne Baker, who told her to wear longer skirts and to button up more. Reade said that she complained to Senate personnel and that Biden's office learned about her complaints.

Reade said, "My life was hell ... this was about power and control ... [after my departure] I couldn't get a job on the Hill." Reade "didn't consider the acts toward her sexualization. She instead [likened herself to] a lamp that was displayed because it was pretty and discarded when too bright." Reade said she wanted Biden to say "I changed the trajectory of your life. I'm sorry." In 2018, she said that the reason for her 1993 departure from Washington was to pursue a career as an actress or artiste due to her disappointment at the American government's xenophobia toward Russia. In 2009, she said that the reason for her 1993 departure from Washington was to move to the Midwestern United States with her boyfriend. She posted these conflicting accounts at the website Medium, and they were deleted by 2020. In 2020, Reade described the accounts as "stupid blog posts" she had made while writing a novel, when she "wasn't ready to talk about Biden". Reade also said that she could not recall writing about the government's xenophobia.

About the same time as that report, The Union published a column by Reade, in which she alleged that her supervisor had informed her that Biden wanted her to "serve drinks at a [sic] event" because he thought she was "pretty" and also "liked" her legs, but a senior aide intervened to stop Reade from having to do so, continuing an argument among the staff. After that, Biden would "often" touch her shoulder and neck. Reade thought that "these gestures were not so much about 'connection' but establishing dominance in the room". Reade also wrote in that essay, "[T]his is not a story about sexual misconduct; it is a story about abuse of power." Reade said she spoke out in 2019 after watching an episode of The View, during which, she says, most of the panelists defended Biden and attacked Lucy Flores, a former assemblywoman, who alleged that Biden kissed the back of her head without consent.

=== Other reporting efforts of 2019 ===
Within various of these articles and of Reade's 2019 self-published posts on Medium, Reade directed her disappointments toward Biden's office staff's interactions with her, implying that she remained unsure whether Biden himself knew of her firing or of its rationale.

In April 2019, the Associated Press interviewed Reade about the allegations she was making at the time; finding that parts of her story contradicted other reports, and that her accusations could not be corroborated, the A.P. declined to report them. At the time, Reade told the Associated Press that Biden rubbed her shoulders and neck and played with her hair. She said a fellow aide told her to dress more modestly at work. Reade said, "I wasn't scared of [Biden], that he was going to take me in a room or anything. It wasn't that kind of vibe."

The Washington Post also interviewed Reade in 2019; it declined to report that interview. In 2020, The Washington Post wrote that Reade had told them that Biden touched her neck and shoulders, "and he had people around saying it was okay". Reade blamed Biden's staff for "bullying", putting less blame on Biden himself: "This is what I want to emphasize: It's not him. It's the people around him who keep covering for him ... he should have known what was happening to me ... Maybe he could have been a little more in touch with his own staff." The Washington Post stated that Reade in 2019 "did not mention the alleged assault or suggest there was more to the story".

In April 2019, Reade contacted Vox reporter Laura McGann to tell her story. Vox did not publish any stories about Reade in 2019, after McGann tried but was not able to verify Reade's account; McGann wrote an article praising other women who had shared allegations about Biden's inappropriate touching. In May 2020, McGann detailed the allegations Reade made to her in 2019 and quoted Reade as saying, "I don't know if [Biden] knew why I left ... He barely knew us by name." Reade sent McGann an essay that was similar to her essay published by The Union in 2019. McGann highlighted the following sentences, which were identical in both essays: "This is not a story about sexual misconduct; it is a story about abuse of power. It is a story about when a member of Congress allows staff to threaten or belittle or bully on their behalf unchecked to maintain power rather than modify the behavior." Reade explained that she had not shared her full story in 2019 because she thought that "the media was shutting her down"; McGann disputes the accuracy of this characterization of reporters' interactions, and notes that Reade had formerly been "adamant ... that this wasn't a [sexual-]misconduct story".

In 2019, Reade told McGann that Reade's deceased mother and one of Reade's friends were the only people she could name as having confided in. Also in 2019, the friend told McGann, "[I]t wasn't that bad. [Biden] never tried to kiss her directly. He never went for one of those touches. It was one of those, 'sorry you took it that way'. ... What was creepy was that it was always in front of people." Reade told McGann that media outlets including The New York Times were working on publishing her story.

== Sexual assault allegation ==
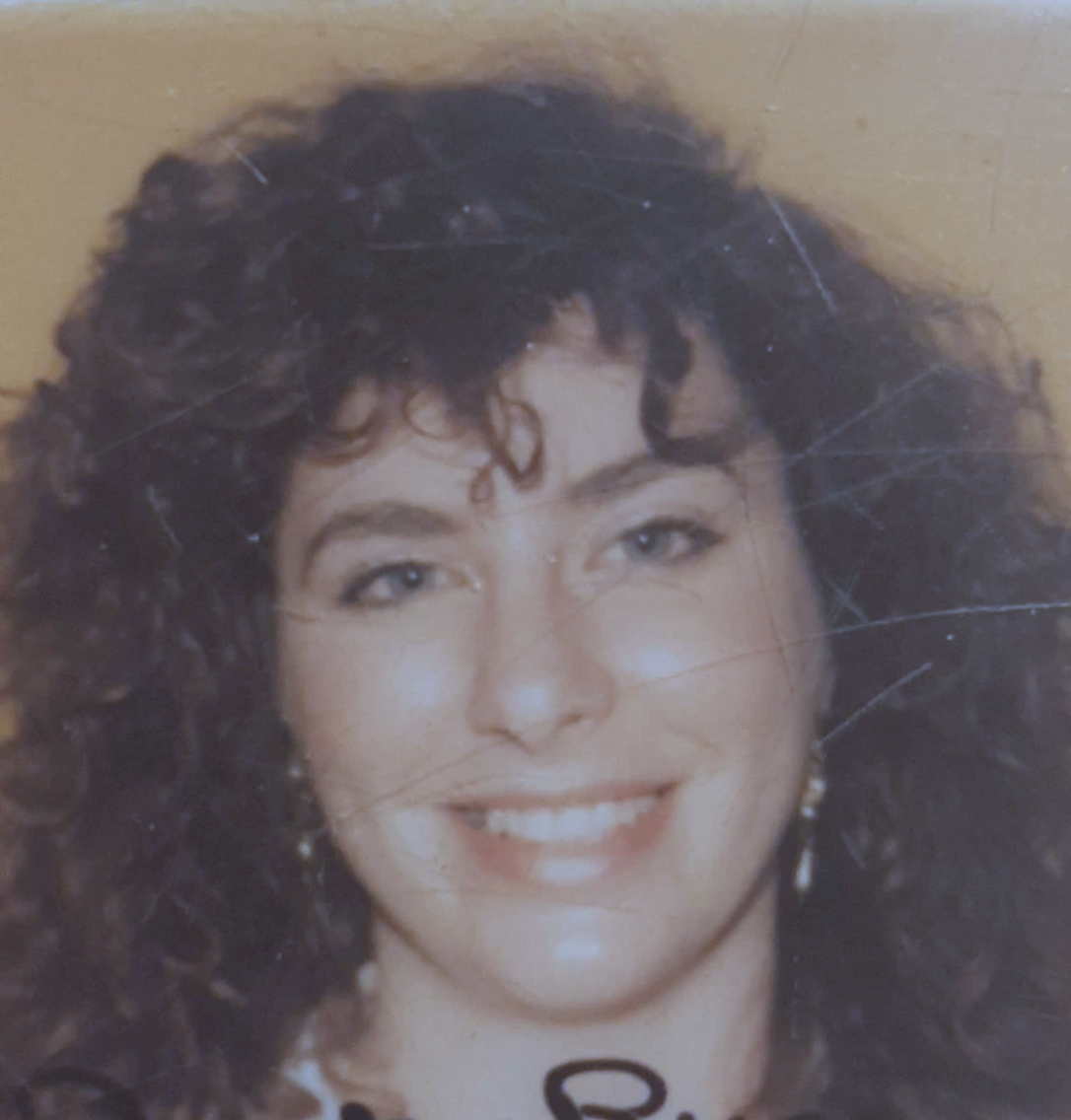
Tara Reade's U.S. House of Representatives identification badge photo (1992)

In a March 25, 2020, interview with Katie Halper, Reade alleged that Biden pushed her against a wall, kissed her, put his hand under her skirt, penetrated her with his fingers, and asked, "Do you want to go somewhere else?" Reade told National Public Radio (NPR) for an April 19 article, "His hands went underneath my clothing and he was touching me in my private areas and without my consent." Reade told The Intercept her impression was that Biden believed he had consent and was surprised when she rejected him. Reade told The New York Times for an April 12 article that when she pulled away from Biden, he looked puzzled and said, "Come on, man, I heard you liked me." She then said he told her "You're nothing to me, nothing", followed by "You're OK, you're fine". Reade told NPR she could not remember the exact place or date of the incident, stating it was likely a basement of a D.C. Senate office building in the spring of 1993.

Reade told The New York Times that, after the alleged assault, she reported the harassment to three of Biden's aides (Ted Kaufman, Dennis Toner, and Marianne Baker), but did not mention the assault. She said that nothing happened as a result, and so she filed a complaint with the Senate personnel office, where she filled out a form to request counselling. Reade told the Associated Press that her complaint to the Senate personnel office was about "retaliation" and "him wanting me to serve drinks because he liked my legs and thought I was pretty and it made me uncomfortable", with no explicit mention of sexual assault or sexual harassment. Reade does not have a copy of her Senate personnel office complaint.

Reade told The New York Times that her office duties were eventually reduced and that Kaufman later said that she did not fit the office, instructing her to find a new job. However, Reade told the Associated Press that it was Toner who stated she did not fit the job and encouraged her to find another job, which the Associated Press noted was a contradiction with her account to The New York Times. In blog posts in January and April 2020, she wrote that no one in Washington, D.C., wanted to hire her after her firing.

=== Reasons for coming forward and timing ===
Addressing why she made her sexual assault allegation public, Reade said, "I'm hoping by coming forward with this — and I know it's hard to listen to, and it's hard to live in it, right? But my justice now, the only justice I can have, is to be moving freely in the world and to heal and not be silenced." According to The Intercept, Reade feared coming forward with her full story of sexual assault and "went silent" after receiving harassment online related to her earlier allegations in April 2019 of inappropriate touching, saying that she later "thought about the world she wanted her daughter to live in and decided that she wanted to continue telling her story". She said she did not share her assault allegation when she initially came forward because, in part, she "just didn't have the courage", and that after publicly alleging that he touched her inappropriately, she said she received death threats, a "wave of criticism", and was doxed.

Asked why she did not present the sexual assault allegations earlier, Reade told Newsweek she "didn't really know how to [come forward] because, how would you?" Reade contacted Time's Up Legal Defense Fund seeking legal and public relations support in an effort to "get her story out in a safe way". Uma Iyer, vice president of The National Women's Law Center (NWLC), which oversees and distributes funds for Time's Up, expressed their desire to provide her as much assistance as they possibly could but funding her legal defense was not possible because of restrictions imposed by their 501(c)(3) status. Time's Up provided Reade a list of attorneys to contact; Reade said she contacted all of them, but none agreed to represent her. After failing to secure legal help, Reade wrote in a January 2020 post on Medium, "I have not told the whole story of what occurred between Joe Biden and myself."

Before Reade went public with her sexual assault allegation, reporter Ryan Grim wrote on Twitter: "A head-to-head Biden v Sanders contest will force voters to take a close look at Biden again. That went very badly for him last time." Reade responded via Twitter on March 3, 2020: "Yup. Timing... wait for it....tic toc." Grim later helped report Reade's story, although he maintains that he was unaware of her March 3 response and had yet to ever speak to Reade by that point. Reade explained her tweet by stating that at the time, she thought she had secured a lawyer from Time's Up to help tell her story.

=== Accounts by Reade's associates ===
On April 12, 2020, a New York Times article reported interviews with Reade, several of her friends, lawyers, people who worked with Biden in the early 1990s, and seven women who accused him of kissing, hugging, or touching them in ways that had made them feel uncomfortable. The seven women did not have any new information to add about their experiences. Still, several did acknowledge that they believed the account by Reade. During the course of conducting its interviews and reporting, The Times said no other allegations of sexual assault by Biden had surfaced. There was no pattern of sexual misconduct that they could find. One friend said that Reade had told her about the alleged assault in 1993, while another said that Reade told her in 2008 that Biden had touched her inappropriately and that "she'd had a traumatic experience while working in his office". The New York Times story included two former interns who said they remembered Reade "suddenly changing roles and no longer overseeing them" at the same time Reade said she had been "abruptly reassigned".

The New York Times and other outlets reported statements by anonymous individuals who said that they had previously heard allegations from Reade of sexual misconduct towards her by Biden. Due to a lack of identification, it is unknown which of these anonymous individuals overlap. The Associated Press reported in April that it spoke with two more people who said Reade had told them parts of her story years ago, publishing their accounts anonymously. One was told of the alleged assault in 1993, and another remembers hearing of "sexual harassment" in 2007 or 2008. The Washington Post spoke to "a friend, a former intern for another lawmaker", who said that Reade had alleged an assault soon after it happened. CNN spoke to a friend of Reade's who had previously interned for Senator Ted Kennedy, who says she was told of both sexual harassment and sexual assault at the time, and that in 2019, she had advised Reade to only go public about harassment, not assault.

Joseph Backholm was friends with Reade between 2002 and 2004 during law school. He said in late May 2020 that Reade had told him, "When I was in Washington, D.C. I was sexually assaulted by someone you would know." Backholm said at the time Reade went by the name Tara McCabe and said he realized he knew Biden's accuser only after recognizing her from the Megyn Kelly interview.

==== Larry King Live audio fragment ====
Reade said in April 2020 that she had told her mother, Jeanette Altimus, about the incident in 1993. By the time Reade made her assault allegation in 2020, Altimus was dead. Reade and her brother stated that their mother had encouraged Reade to call the police after the alleged incident, and that her brother regretted having previously told Reade to "move on, guys are idiots".

Reade previously said that Altimus called into Larry King Live anonymously saying, "my daughter was sexually harassed and retaliated against and fired. Where can she go for help?" The episode, which was about the "cutthroat nature of Washington, D.C., politics and media", was broadcast by CNN on August 11, 1993, with the title "Washington: The Cruelest City on Earth?" and featured an anonymous caller from San Luis Obispo, California, who said, "I'm wondering what a staffer would do besides go to the press in Washington? My daughter has just left there, after working for a prominent senator, and could not get through with her problems at all, and the only thing she could have done was go to the press, and she chose not to do it out of respect for him." King then asked, "So she had a story to tell but out of respect for the person she worked for she didn't tell it?" The caller answered, "That's true." CNN verified that Altimus lived in San Luis Obispo at the time of the call.

==== Declaration of Reade's ex-husband ====
On May 7, 2020, The Tribune reported on a declaration Reade's former husband, Theodore Dronen, submitted to a court in 1996 to contest a restraining order Reade had filed against him after he had filed for divorce. Dronen wrote that Reade had mentioned "a problem she was having at work regarding sexual harassment, in U.S. Senator Joe Biden's office". The document did not name Biden as the perpetrator or mention sexual assault. Dronen added that Reade "eventually struck a deal with the chief of staff of the Senator's office and left her position ... It was obvious that this event had a very traumatic effect on [Reade], and that she is still sensitive and effected [sic] by it."

Dronen cited the alleged incident as one of several examples that "color [Reade's] perception and judgment" for her request of a restraining order. Dronen confirmed to The Tribune on May 7, 2020, that he had written the declaration and declined to comment any further on it, saying, "Tara and I ended our relationship over two decades ago under difficult circumstances. I am not interested in reliving that chapter of my life. I wish Tara well, and I have nothing further to say."

=== Reporting by Vox and others ===
In May 2020, Vox journalist Laura McGann spoke again to the anonymous friend who in 2019 told McGann that she heard Biden had touched Reade but had not sexually assaulted her, having not even "tried to kiss her directly". The friend now told McGann a story matching Reade's 2020 allegation of sexual assault, explaining the earlier lack of such: "She wanted to leave a layer there, and I did not want to betray that. It just wasn't my place." Vox journalist Laura McGann asked Reade why she had not mentioned Lynda LaCasse as a potentially relevant source either in 2019 or in 2020 to the first few journalists who had interviewed Reade, including Katie Halper. Reade replied that she did not think LaCasse was a relevant source because she only told LaCasse about the incident in 1995. Reade also told McGann that she had also originally thought that two other anonymous friends were not relevant, and thus had not mentioned them to journalists earlier.

Some associates of Reade who claim they have heard from her previously have disclosed their identities. Lorraine Sanchez came forward to Business Insider; she was Reade's co-worker from 1994 to 1996, and says she was told about "sexual harassment" by Reade, and about a complaint filed, leading to the loss of her job, but she does not recall if Reade named Biden or what kind of harassment took place. Lynda LaCasse, an ex-neighbour of Reade's, also came forward to Business Insider, and later CNN, for articles published on April 27 and 28 respectively. LaCasse told CNN that Reade had told her about the alleged assault by Biden "...in the mid-1990s". LaCasse told CNN she had advised Reade at the time to file a police report. According to CNN, "it was last year when Reade brought up Biden that LaCasse told her that she remembered their conversation about the alleged sexual assault." LaCasse told Business Insider that she remembered the allegations when Reade contacted her recently, saying, "this Joe Biden thing is coming up again."

Collin Moulton, Reade's brother, initially reported to The Washington Post that Reade told him in 1993 that Biden had touched her neck and shoulders. He said there was "a gym bag incident", and that Biden "was inappropriate". ABC News also interviewed Moulton in March 2020; he told them that Reade had mentioned "'harassment at work' from Biden" but that "he only heard her account of the assault this spring". Later that day, Moulton texted ABC News to "clarify" that Reade had told him in 1993 that Biden had "more or less cornered her against a wall" and "put his hands up her clothes".

=== Various journalists' investigations ===
According to a summary within an Associated Press investigative piece based on interviews with over a dozen of Reade's acquaintances, Reade used "her charm and flair for drama to manipulate those supporting her until their goodwill [ran] out", and "some people who dealt with her found her duplicitous and deceitful, while others found her a heroic survivor". Reade said to the Associated Press, "I'm not a lying, manipulative user. I've really understood what it's like to be struggling and poor."

Natasha Korecki of Politico interviewed several former acquaintances of Reade's who said that they had bad experiences with her. Korecki describes two emerging themes from their stories: As recently as 2018, Reade "spoke favorably about her time working for Biden", and Reade "left them feeling duped". These acquaintances believe Reade had been "deceitful" and "manipulative" with them. One, attorney and domestic violence victims' advocate Kelly Klett, had rented a room in her home to Reade in 2018. Klett said that Reade phoned her in 2019 after Reade's interview with The Union alleging Biden touched her neck and shoulders. Klett said that she became suspicious of the motives behind the call, because of a sense that she "was trying to plant a story with me, so she could later say: 'I told the story to this attorney I worked with.'"

Reade's then-attorney Douglas Wigdor said to Politico that he believed that referring to Reade's disputes with former landlords "does not advance the conversation" regarding her allegation of sexual assault. Wigdor also asserted that positive comments from an accuser regarding the accused is "not uncommon".

=== Further developments ===
On April 9, 2020, Reade filed a police report with the Washington Metropolitan Police Department alleging she was sexually assaulted in the spring of 1993. Reade acknowledged that the statute of limitations has lapsed, and she stated that she filed the report "for safety reasons only". The Washington Metropolitan Police said on April 25 that her complaint is an inactive case. According to USA Today, "A record reviewed by AP didn't mention Biden by name. NPR has reported, however, that a record does name Biden and has filed a Freedom of Information Act request for the full report."

On April 28, Reade told Fox News, "I'm calling for the release of the documents being held by the University of Delaware that contain Biden's staff personnel records because I believe it will have my complaint form, as well as my separation letter and other documents", and questioned why they were under seal. (Note: Reade has said she filed a complaint with a congressional personnel office, but that it does not mention sexual assault, or the phrase "sexual harassment". Instead, she used the words "uncomfortable" and "retaliation".) (Note: Biden's senatorial records in the possession of the University of Delaware consist of "1,875 boxes and 415 gigabytes of electronic content, largely uncatalogued". A spokeswoman for the university said that the curation of the records would not be completed before 2021 and that they were unable to identify specific documents or files within the collection. On May 20, the school denied a Freedom of Information act request from Fox News on the grounds that state law exempts them from requests other than those related to "public funds".) In response, on May 1, Biden issued a statement saying that staff personnel files are stored in the National Archives and Records Administration, and not stored in his documents at University of Delaware. He then called on the secretary of the Senate to work with the National Archives to identify and release any complaint by Reade and any other relevant documents. Biden reiterated his request later that morning in an interview with Mika Brzezinski on MSNBC. The same day, New York Times reporter Lisa Lerer said Reade had canceled a planned interview with Fox News, stating that "death threats received by her and her child made her nervous about being in the public eye". On May 4, the secretary of the Senate's office stated that it could not comply with Biden's request, as the records are "strictly confidential". Biden's campaign then asked whether the existence of the records and their complainants could be disclosed, as well as procedures and forms for such complaints in 1993. In an interview with Megyn Kelly, Reade said she would be willing to take a polygraph if Biden did. Kelly also asked whether Reade, like Christine Blasey Ford, would be willing to go under cross examination and testify under oath; Reade answered "absolutely" to both questions.

On May 8, the Associated Press reported that lawyers Douglas Wigdor and William Moran were representing Reade. Wigdor, who is known for representing six women who alleged sexual misconduct by Harvey Weinstein and for being a prominent Donald Trump donor, stated that he was working pro bono; Moran is a former writer and editor for Russian news agency Sputnik. On May 11, Wigdor said that his firm had sent a letter to Biden to again ask for permission to search his archives and to the Senate Secretary's office to release a copy of the complaint Reade allegedly filed in 1993. On May 22, Wigdor announced that he was no longer representing Reade.

=== Reade's credibility called into question ===
On May 19, CNN published a report on Reade and her allegations, in which Antioch University disputed Reade's claims that she had earned a bachelor's degree there, and had worked there as a "visiting professor". Karen Hamilton, a spokesperson for Antioch, said that Reade never graduated, and attended Antioch for only three quarters; additionally, she said Reade was never a faculty member of the university, and had only worked in a part-time position performing administrative work at the school as a "Prior Learning Evaluator".

Reade claimed to have obtained a bachelor's degree through a "protected program" for survivors of sexual assault, and that she had been "fast-tracked" into the law school of Seattle University with the help of Antioch's then-president Tullise Murdock. These claims were also denied by Antioch, which stated that no such protected program had existed and that Murdock said there had been no special arrangements.

When questioned if she was licensed to practice law in California, Reade testified that she had never taken the bar exam; however, a blog post of hers written in 2012 documented her third attempt to pass the California bar exam. She testified that she had worked as a legislative assistant for Biden; according to U.S. Senate records, Reade instead worked as a staff assistant, a more junior role. Finally, Reade's resume said she worked for Biden from 1991 to 1994; however, Reade worked for Biden for eight months from 1992 to 1993.

Reade's credentials and the veracity of her testimony as an expert witness in domestic violence cases was challenged by several California attorneys against whose clients she had appeared. Reade had served as an expert witness on multiple cases involving domestic violence in Monterey County, California. Defendants' attorneys and the district attorney's office announced the review of cases to determine whether Reade misrepresented her credentials, and whether her testimony significantly influenced the outcome of the cases. Subsequently Reade was investigated by prosecutors in Monterey County, California, for lying under oath about her educational credentials in her appearances as an expert witness on domestic abuse. The investigation determined that she had made false statements under oath, but Reade was not prosecuted for perjury because those statements had not been material to the outcome of a legal case.

After the investigations by journalists challenging Reade's credibility, her allegations did not prevent the Democratic Party from nominating Biden for president at the 2020 Democratic National Convention, and Biden was elected president in November. Reade has never recanted her accusations, speaking out in interviews after Biden's inauguration and after the 2022 midterms, encouraging the new Republican U.S. House majority to investigate her claims.

=== Defection to Russia ===
In May 2023, Reade said she had defected to Russia during an interview with Sputnik in Moscow alongside Maria Butina, whom she called her friend. Butina had previously been convicted of being an unregistered Russian agent in the United States and said that she asked Vladimir Putin personally to accelerate Reade's Russian citizenship request. In the interview, Reade expressed criticism of the United States, and said that she felt safe in Moscow. Several former intelligence officials expressed concerns. Javed Ali, a former senior National Security Council official in the Trump administration, said that "given Reade's self-described relationship with Butina, it's possible that Russia helped facilitate her move to Russia as part of an anti-U.S. propaganda campaign". Former CIA analyst Gail Helt went further: "To me, if I'm an intelligence officer watching that, I think she could absolutely be a Russian asset. She could be witting or unwitting. But when she shows up in Moscow, I think she's witting at that point."

== Denial and response ==
In March 2020, Biden's presidential campaign issued a response through a deputy campaign manager, Kate Bedingfield. She said, "Vice President Biden has dedicated his public life to changing the culture and the laws around violence against women. He authored and fought for the passage and reauthorization of the landmark Violence Against Women Act. He firmly believes that women have a right to be heard – and heard respectfully. Such claims should also be diligently reviewed by an independent press. What is clear about this claim: It is untrue. This absolutely did not happen."

Biden personally addressed the allegation on May 1, declaring in a live interview on the MSNBC program Morning Joe that "it never, never happened". Additionally, Biden issued an official statement denying the allegation, and calling for the media to "examine and evaluate the full and growing record of inconsistencies in her story, which has changed repeatedly in both small and big ways". In his formal statement, Biden referenced the Violence Against Women Act he said he wrote "over 25 years ago", adding:

I knew we had to change not only the law, but the culture. ... I recognize my responsibility to be a voice, an advocate, and a leader for the change in culture that has begun but is nowhere near finished. So I want to address allegations by a former staffer that I engaged in misconduct 27 years ago. They aren't true.

Following the allegation, David Axelrod, a former top aide for President Barack Obama's 2008 campaign, stated that the vetting process for choosing Biden as the Vice President did not find any allegations of sexual misconduct.

In 2020, when asked by MSNBC's Lawrence O'Donnell if he remembered Reade, Biden said, "To be honest with you, I don't."

== Former staffers supporting Biden ==
=== Female staffers supporting Biden ===
Marianne Baker, Biden's former executive assistant, issued the following statement through the Biden campaign, "I never once witnessed, or heard of, or received, any reports of inappropriate conduct, period – not from Ms. Reade, not from anyone. I have absolutely no knowledge or memory of Ms. Reade's accounting of events, which would have left a searing impression on me as a woman professional, and as a manager." Separately, Melissa Lefko, a contemporary staff assistant, said she had never experienced harassment and thought his office was a "very supportive environment for women".

On May 15, 2020, the PBS NewsHour published an article summarizing their interviews with 74 former Biden staffers. Many of the staffers did not believe Reade's allegations. Over 20 interviewees worked there at the same time as Reade; many did not remember her. The authors of the article, Daniel Bush and Lisa Desjardins, concluded from the interviews that "Biden was known as a demanding but fair and family-oriented boss, devoted to his home life in Delaware and committed to gender equality in his office", and that he was not one of the "creepy" male senators that female staffers told each other to avoid.

=== Contradictions ===
Some details of Reade's recollections of her time in Biden's office were corroborated (including Biden's gym route and being told to dress more modestly), and some were contradicted. None of the staffers had heard about any sexual misconduct by Biden. Some staffers doubted that Biden could have assaulted Reade as described without being seen because the area was typically crowded with people and lacked any out-of-view private areas or alcoves that could match Reade's recollection. Certain staffers ruled out her claim of being asked to serve drinks at a fundraiser. Over 50 staffers said that they did not remember attending campaign fundraisers for Biden; some recounted that there was a policy banning staffers from campaigning.

One staffer, Ben Savage, who said he worked directly beside Reade, told PBS and CNN that Reade was overwhelmed by the workload and that he reported her to deputy chief of staff Dennis Toner for mishandling constituent mail, resulting in her tasks being diminished, and her job was eventually terminated for not performing well enough. Savage additionally told CNN that Reade instead believed that she lost her job due to "being discriminated against for her health issue".

== Commentary ==
=== Assessment of truth and consistency ===
NPR's Asma Khalid wrote, "Some details of Reade's account have been inconsistent, and her story has changed over time", noting that in 2019 she did not mention sexual assault. Laura McGann of Vox, who conducted multiple interviews of Reade and other relevant sources, stated, "The story that both she and her corroborating witnesses are telling has changed dramatically." Joan Walsh, writing in The Nation, said Reade's allegation of sexual assault "doesn't stand up to close scrutiny". In New York Magazine, political commentator Jonathan Chait stated that at first, he found Reade's claims believable, but that the findings reported by PBS, Laura McGann in Vox, and Natasha Korecki in Politico cast doubt on the veracity of the allegations.

Katie Halper, whose interview with Reade, which was published in Current Affairs, broke the sexual assault allegation, wrote in The Guardian, "Reade provided more details over time, something that is common among survivors of sexual assault." Nathan J. Robinson, Editor-In-Chief of Current Affairs, talked to Reade extensively and wrote that she was "completely consistent and frank". Ryan Grim of The Intercept, who has written articles on Reade's more serious allegation against Biden, opined to The Washington Post that, "given that multiple people say she's been telling this story for 25-plus years", subsequent revelations concerning Reade's reputation with these former acquaintances "don't really change [her] stories' basic contours".

=== Media vetting and politicization ===
Laura McGann of Vox detailed her attempts to verify Reade's story and her frustration as a professional journalist wanting to break the story but not being able to get enough corroborating evidence to do so, as reporters were able to do for the accusations against Harvey Weinstein and Charlie Rose. As a result, Vox did not publish anything about Reade in 2019. Neither did The New York Times, The Washington Post, and the Associated Press, who were also pursuing the story. In Slate, Christina Cauterucci questioned Reade's choice of Megyn Kelly's unaffiliated "one-woman show", which is not required to abide by strict journalistic standards, for her first on-air interview. Amanda Marcotte of Salon stated that, "The story of Reade's allegations against Biden shows what can happen when the rigorous standards espoused by mainstream publications are sidestepped for a more credulous and politicized approach. The failure to vet this story methodically and to preemptively address its odder elements opened the door to a whirlwind of conspiracy theories and misinformation." The Guardian columnist Arwa Mahdawi said it was frustrating to see conservatives "weaponize the accusations" and liberals "turning a blind eye" to them.
