= Drinking Liberally =

Liberal Drinkers listening intently to other liberal drinkers, 2/24/06

Drinking Liberally is a political and social organization where self-identified liberals and progressives gather in bars to socialize and talk politics – it is the most well-known program of the Living Liberally network. Founded in May 2003 by Justin Krebs and Matt O'Neill at Rudy's Bar and Grill in the Hell's Kitchen neighborhood of New York City, it has, as of March 2008, 240 chapters in forty-five states, plus Washington DC, Vancouver, Calgary, Buenos Aires Argentina and Melbourne Australia. The group has drawn attention from the national and international press. Katrina Baker is National Organizer for Drinking Liberally. The name Drinking Liberally was conceived by Owen Roth.

The first chapter outside of New York was formed when a member of the original group moved to San Francisco; the later growth of Drinking Liberally is partly due to the influence of left-leaning political blogs, which spread the word and encouraged people outside of the New York City area to start their own chapters.

Chapters of Drinking Liberally meet at a regular bar or pub, and at a regular time each week or month, to enable members to discuss liberal and progressive politics in a friendly environment. Drinking Liberally has also served as a place for progressive networking and as a place for local and state-level politicians to recruit volunteers and generate support for their campaigns. Membership in the Democratic Party is not a requirement, and many attendees do not describe themselves as Democrats. There is no ideological requirement for attendance; however, in keeping with the group's name, nearly all who do attend identify with the "liberal" label.

In the early stages of Drinking Liberally's growth, attendees were predominantly young (between twenty and thirty years old); as the organization has expanded and received greater media coverage, a much wider range of ages can be found at any particular meeting, and some chapters have been founded by people well over the age of thirty.

The organization's website asks that chapters observe the following rules:

- That they meet at a regular meeting time and place.
- That they do not charge for admission.
- That they remain independent of other organizations.
- That the organizer of each chapter check in with the national team each month.
- That members be encouraged to donate to the network.
- That no chapter endorse specific candidates or issue campaigns.
- That its members drink responsibly.
