= Ryan Grim =

American author and journalist (born 1978)

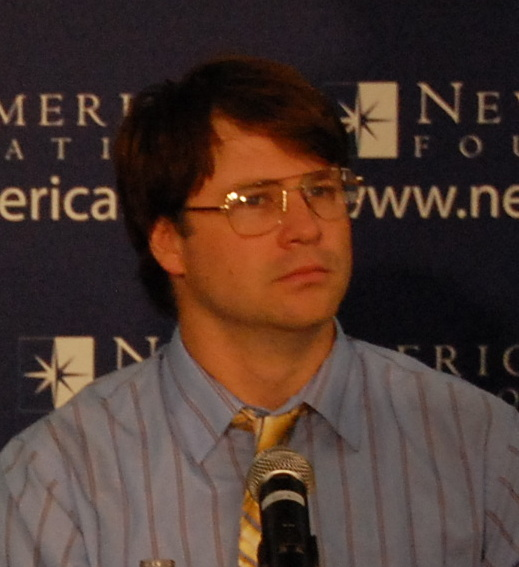
- Grim in 2009
- Born: March 23, 1978 (age 48); Allentown, Pennsylvania, U.S.
- Education: St. Mary's College of Maryland (BA); University of Maryland, College Park (MPP)
- Occupation: Journalist
- Children: 4

Ryan W. Grim (born March 23, 1978) is an American author and journalist. Grim was Washington, D.C., bureau chief for HuffPost and formerly the Washington, D.C., bureau chief for The Intercept. In July 2024, Grim and The Intercept's co-founder Jeremy Scahill left The Intercept to co-found Drop Site News. He is an author and has published some of his books through Strong Arm Press, an independent progressive publishing house he cofounded. Grim has been described as a left-populist.

Grim is a current contributor at The American Prospect, an independent online and magazine publication focused on liberal policy analysis. He and conservative journalist Emily Jashinsky were the regular Friday hosts of Rising before they resigned in September 2022 and joined Breaking Points, where they hosted the now defunct show Counterpoints and frequently appear on episodes as hosts.

== Early life and education ==
Grim was born in Allentown, Pennsylvania. He earned a Bachelor of Arts degree in Philosophy from St. Mary's College of Maryland, and Master of Public Policy from the University of Maryland, College Park.

== Career ==
After earning his master's degree, Grim worked as a legislative analyst for the Marijuana Policy Project. Grim has written about the history of drug use and drug culture in the United States. He has presented his research on why drugs are popular at certain times in history and his thoughts on the government's war on drugs. He also worked as a stockbroker in New York City from 2000 to 2001.

Grim joined HuffPost (then The Huffington Post) in January 2009. In his role heading a team at HuffPost, reporters on the team twice made finalist for the Pulitzer Prize. Towards the end of his tenure at HuffPost, significant leadership changes were occurring, sparked by Arianna Huffington's exit.

In 2016, Grim published a blog post in which he questioned FiveThirtyEight's models and predictions for the 2016 United States presidential election. FiveThirtyEight had predicted that Trump had a greater chance of winning the election than that predicted by other analysts. FiveThirtyEight founder Nate Silver responded to Grim's criticisms. After Trump won the election, Grim apologized, tweeting "You were right that there was far more uncertainty than we were accounting for. I apologize. Gonna stick to punditry".

=== The Intercept ===
Grim left his position at HuffPost in 2017 after nine years with the paper, joining The Intercept to head its Washington, D.C. bureau.

During the Brett Kavanaugh Supreme Court nomination, Grim was the first to report that California senator Dianne Feinstein had received a letter related to Kavanaugh, later revealed to be from Christine Blasey Ford, alleging that Kavanaugh had sexually assaulted its author in high school. Grim also reported on former Trump aide Rob Porter's abuse allegations by his ex-wives. He reported early on the 2018 campaign of Alexandria Ocasio-Cortez.

In 2023, Grim obtained and published a leaked Pakistani diplomatic cable alleging U.S. State Department pressure on the Pakistani government to remove Prime Minister Imran Khan from office in 2022.

=== Drop Site News ===
In July 2024, Grim and Jeremy Scahill, the co-founder of The Intercept, founded Drop Site News. Although there was previously friction between the pair and The Intercept board, Drop Site is backed with some funding by The Intercept.

In February 2025, Grim and Drop Site News broke the story that the U.S. State Department had allocated $400 million for "Armored Tesla" in a procurement document. After the story broke, the document was amended to read "Armored Electric Vehicles" instead. The story prompted Senator Richard Blumenthal and Congressman Gregory Meeks to send letters to Secretary of State Marco Rubio highlighting the conflict of interest in Elon Musk's role as CEO of Tesla while also working for the Department of Government Efficiency.

=== Breaking Points ===
Grim joined Breaking Points in 2022 as a co-host alongside Emily Jashinsky, after leaving The Hill's Rising. Two pair hosted the show on Tuesdays, named Counterpoints. As of 2026, Counterpoints has been dissolved, and Breaking Points has incorporated Jashinsky and Grim into the program throughout the week. Grim co-hosts the show frequently alongside Jashinsky or the other co-hosts, Enjeti and Ball.

=== Publishing ===
Following the move to The Intercept, Grim and Alex Lawson established Strong Arm Press, a small imprint printing press. Grim launched the press because he felt that the first Trump administration was moving too quickly for the standard publishing cycle, which takes around a year to publish a book. He launched Strong Arm Press to accommodate shorter, cheaper, lower-volume books with a shorter publishing turnaround time. The first title published was Out of the Ooze, a profile of Tom Price that reached Amazon's top 100 list. Books are funded through crowdfunding campaigns. Grim published We've Got People, a history of progressivism and the Democratic Party, through Strong Arm Press in 2019. In 2023, he published The Squad: AOC and the Hope of a Political Revolution.

== Personal life ==
Grim is married and has four children.

Grim made headlines after he got into a physical altercation with Fox News host Jesse Watters, over treatment of Watters toward one of Grim's former Huffpost colleagues, at the 2016 White House Correspondents dinner.

== Publications ==
- This Is Your Country on Drugs: The Secret History of Getting High in America; Publisher: Wiley (June 22, 2009) ISBN 0-470-16739-4.
- We've Got People: From Jesse Jackson to Alexandria Ocasio-Cortez, the End of Big Money and the Rise of a Movement (May 2019) ISBN 978-1-947492-38-7
- The Squad: AOC and the Hope of a Political Revolution (December 2023) ISBN 978-1250869074
