= Living Liberally =

Living Liberally is the general name for a multifaceted, grassroots progressive community-building movement started in New York City in 2003. The inception of Drinking Liberally and its parent organization, until 2008 known as Cosmopolity, united a growing progressive social network under one name. According to the website, Living Liberally's goal is "providing easy entrance into progressive involvement, using social interaction to promote political action and facilitating collaboration among progressive organizations." Current Living Liberally projects include Drinking Liberally, Laughing Liberally, Screening Liberally, Reading Liberally, and Eating Liberally. The majority of Living Liberally projects are organized by volunteers rather than the national organizers. Living Liberally was founded by David Alpert, Katrina Baker, Matthew O'Neill, and Justin Krebs.

In April, 2007, the 200th chapter of Drinking Liberally was created in Pagosa Springs, Colorado.

== See also ==
- Drinking Liberally
