= Rising (web series) =

American daily news and opinion web series

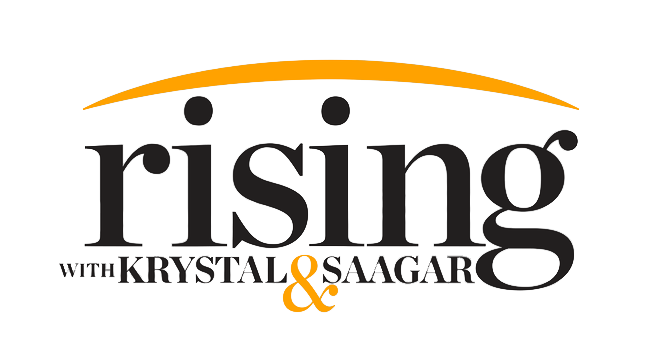
- Logo of the Krystal Ball and Saagar Enjeti-hosted iteration
- Genre: Political news and commentary
- Presented by: Current: Robby Soave; Lindsey Granger; Former: Briahna Joy Gray; Krystal Ball; Buck Sexton; Saagar Enjeti; Ryan Grim; Katie Halper; Kim Iversen; Emily Jashinsky; Jessica Burbank; Batya Ungar-Sargon
- Country of origin: United States
- Original language: English

Production
- Running time: 30 minutes
- Production companies: The Hill, Nexstar Media Group

Original release
- Release: June 13, 2018 – present

The Hill's Rising (or simply Rising) is an American daily news and opinion web series produced by Washington, D.C. political newspaper The Hill. The series is available on The Hill's website and YouTube.

Gradually gaining popularity on YouTube throughout 2019 and 2020, the show's longest-serving hosts were Krystal Ball and Saagar Enjeti, until their departure in May 2021. The show was hosted by journalist Ryan Grim and Emily Jashinsky until they also left in September 2022. The current hosts are journalists Robby Soave and Lindsey Granger.

== About ==
Rising features commentary and analysis of political news and current events, in-studio interviews with politicians, campaign staff and surrogates, political advisors and strategists, and members of the news media. When Ball and Enjeti hosted, the show presented a synthesis of populist left and populist right viewpoints.

The series is available on The Hill's website, YouTube, and a streaming channel.

=== Format ===
Rising typically produces five episode a week, Monday-Friday. There are usually about eight pre-taped segments per episode. Each host presents a "radar" segment which analyze current events and present commentary in a monologue format, usually organized into three or four bullet-points. This is followed by an open discussion.

== History ==
Logo the Buck Sexton and Krystal Ball-hosted iteration

In 2018, The Hill announced Krystal Ball and Buck Sexton as presenters of a new slate of original programming to be produced by John Solomon. Rising launched in June 2018 as Rising with Krystal & Buck with Buck Sexton as host. Sexton departed in June 2019, with Saagar Enjeti replacing him. In the press release, Ball was slated as the "progressive co-host on a morning show with a conservative co-host". The show focused on attacking "Democrats such as Joe Biden and Pete Buttigieg."

In late 2019, it had an average of 600,000 viewers daily. As of October 2020, the Hill's YouTube channel averaged 1.48 million views per day, and had around 1.2 million subscribers. Enjeti and Ball also co-authored a book, The Populist's Guide to 2020: A New Right and New Left Are Rising. In 2020, the show did a few live-stream analysis programs for important political events like the 2020 Democratic primary and the 2020 general elections.

In March 2022, YouTube suspended Rising's channel for seven days for allegedly "violating the platform's rules around election misinformation". Then-Rising host Ryan Grim stated in The Intercept: "Two infractions were cited: First, the outlet posted the full video of former President Donald Trump's recent speech at the Conservative Political Action Conference on its page. Second, Rising played a minutelong clip of Trump's commentary on Russia's invasion of Ukraine, which included the claim that none of it would have happened if not for a "rigged election.""

=== Since 2021 ===
In May 2021, Ball and Enjeti announced they were departing Rising in order to release their own independent project, Breaking Points with Krystal and Saagar. They were temporarily replaced with Ryan Grim and The Federalist editor Emily Jashinsky. In July 2021, Kim Iversen took over from Jashinsky, who said on Twitter that she had never intended to do Rising full time. According to The Daily Beast, Iversen was a controversial figure:

Aside from her COVID-19 vaccine skepticism, she also sparked complaints from Hill employees after she defended the Chinese government’s harsh treatment of Uyghurs (prompting co-host Ryan Grim to push back on-air) and seemed to peddle pro-Russian propaganda about Ukraine... [and] Iversen recently got into a back-and-forth with fellow Rising co-host Olayemi Olurin over deadnaming actor Elliot Page.

From early 2022, its regular weekday presenters were left-wing Briahna Joy Gray (a former Bernie Sanders campaign spokesperson) and libertarian Robby Soave (an editor for Reason magazine).

Iversen, a vaccine skeptic, left the show in July 2022 after Batya Ungar-Sargon rather than Iversen was picked to interview Anthony Fauci (of whom Iversen had previously been critical) with Soave.

Grim and Jashinsky, who were the regular Friday hosts of Rising, resigned in September 2022. Also in September 2022, Rising refused to air a segment on their show in which left-wing political commentator Katie Halper called Israel an "apartheid government". She was subsequently fired from the show.

As of 2023, Jessica Burbank and Amber Duke presented Rising on Fridays.

On June 7, 2024, Briahna Joy Gray, who had frequently courted controversy during the 2023 Gaza war, was fired from Rising after allegedly dismissing trauma and rolling her eyes during an interview with the sister of an Israeli woman held hostage by Hamas, who urged her to believe Israeli women's accounts of sexual assault on October 7.
