= Saagar Enjeti =

American political podcaster and journalist (born 1992)

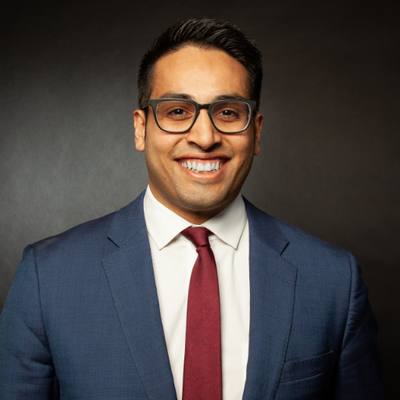
- Enjeti in 2020
- Born: April 21, 1992 (age 34)
- Education: George Washington University (BA); Georgetown University (MA)
- Political party: Republican
- Spouse: Jill McGrath (m. 2023)
- Children: 1

Saagar Enjeti (born April 21, 1992) is an American journalist and political podcast host currently co-hosting the American political news and opinion series Breaking Points alongside Krystal Ball. He previously hosted The Realignment with Marshall Kosloff.

== Early life and education ==
Enjeti was born in Texas, on April 21, 1992, and grew up in College Station, Texas. His parents are Telugu immigrants from India, Prasad Enjeti and Radhika Viruru, both professors at Texas A&M University. He graduated from George Washington University in 2014 where he majored in economics. In 2018, he received a master's degree in security policy from Georgetown University.

== Career ==
Enjeti served as a media fellow for the Hudson Institute, where he co-hosted the podcast The Realignment with Marshall Kosloff. He also served as a Tony Blankley fellow at the Steamboat Institute.

Enjeti began his media career at The Daily Caller, at the time owned by Tucker Carlson, as its White House Correspondent. According to Enjeti, he obtained the job by cold emailing someone at the outlet who tangentially knew a friend of his.

He co-hosted Rising with Krystal Ball and wrote for The Hill from 2019 to 2021. The pair co-wrote the book The Populist's Guide to 2020 which focused on left and right populism in America.

In 2021, Enjeti and Ball left Rising to start their own show called Breaking Points, which became the number one political podcast one week after launching and reached one million subscribers on YouTube in 2023.

== Personal life ==
Enjeti spent a year of high school in Qatar, at the American School of Doha. Enjeti married Jill McGrath in July 2023, with an initial wedding ceremony in India, and another wedding ceremony in Rhode Island. Their daughter was born in 2025. Enjeti is an atheist.

== Bibliography ==
- The Populist's Guide to 2020, with Krystal Ball.
