= Robby Soave =

American journalist (born 1988)

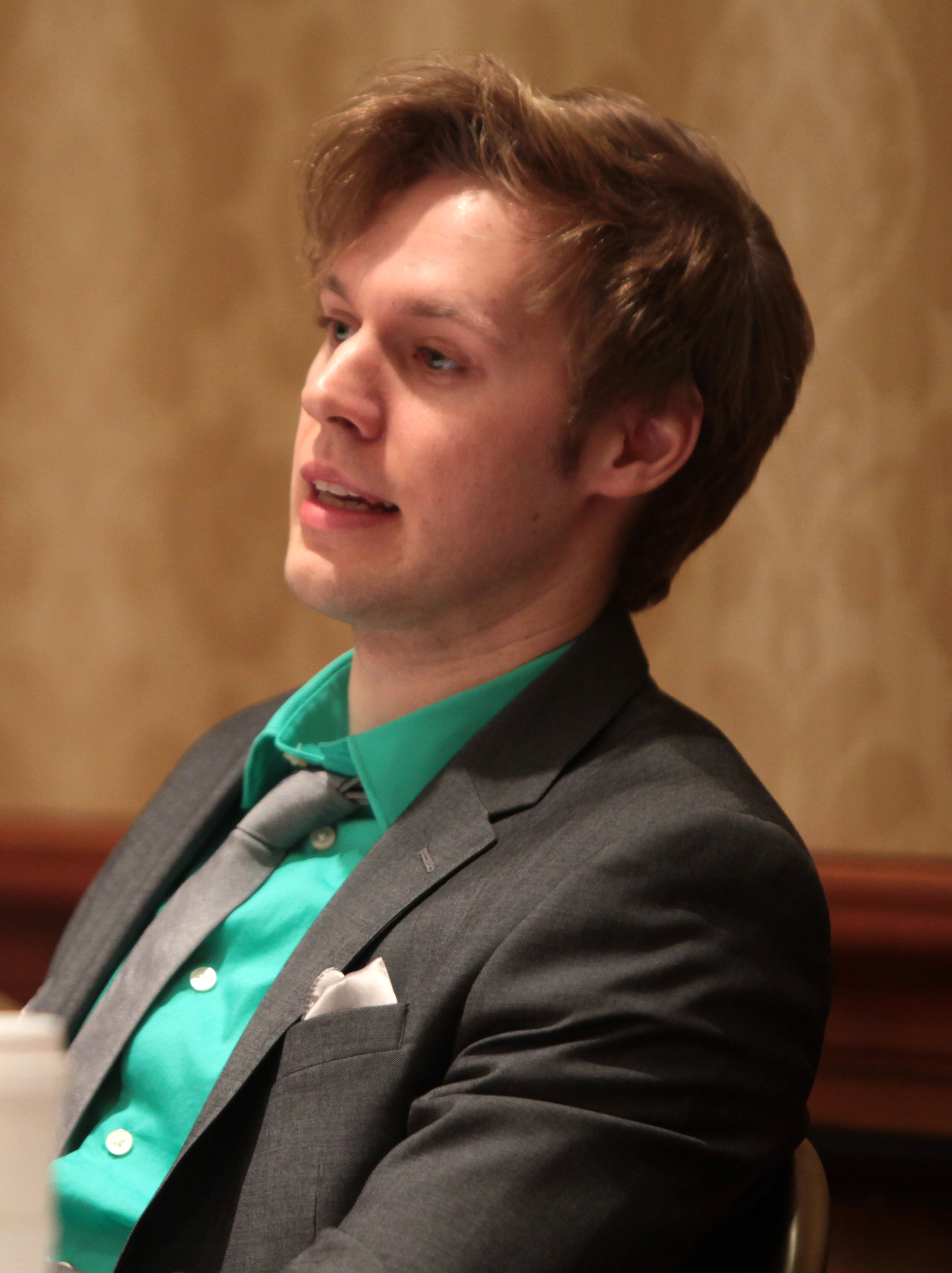
- Soave speaking at a 2015 event in Washington, D.C.
- Born: Robert Emil Soave Jr. August 8, 1988 (age 38); Detroit, Michigan, U.S.
- Education: University of Michigan (BA)
- Occupation: Journalist
- Spouse: Carrie Soave (m. 2014; div. 2024)

Robert Emil Soave Jr. (/swɑːveɪ/, so-AH-vé; born August 8, 1988) is an American libertarian journalist. He is a senior editor for Reason and co-host of The Hill's web news commentary series program Rising. He is also the author of two books about freedom of speech and related issues.

== Early life and education ==
Soave was born in Detroit on August 8, 1988. (Note: See also Soave, Robby [@robbysoave] (August 8, 2019). "It's my birthday today (8-8-88, isn't that cool?) and if you were considering getting me a gift, what you should do instead is order my book! Rave reviews from The Guardian, Washington Examiner, and others" (Tweet) – via Twitter.) He graduated from the University of Michigan.

== Career ==
Soave is a senior editor at Reason and one of the hosts of Rising on Hill TV, the online channel of The Hill newspaper. Among the issues he has written about include civil liberties, culture, education policy, politics, television, and video games. His work has appeared in several publications, including among others The Daily Beast, The Detroit News, The New York Times, and U.S. News & World Report. He also appears as a commentator on TV networks including CNN and Fox News.

In 2015, Soave won a Southern California Journalism Award from the Los Angeles Press Club for his writing about the Rolling Stone story "A Rape on Campus". He was named in the 2016 Forbes 30 Under 30 list. In 2017, Soave became a Novak Fellow at The Fund for American Studies. Additionally, he serves on the D.C. Advisory Committee to the U.S. Commission on Civil Rights. Soave gained media attention for his writings defending the Covington Catholic High School students involved in the January 2019 Lincoln Memorial confrontation, prompting several news outlets to issue corrections or apologies.

In Panic Attack: Young Radicals in the Age of Trump (2019), which was published by All Points Books, Soave profiles young progressive activists as well as those on the political right, and discusses issues such as intersectionality, political correctness, and free speech on college campuses. Writing in The Guardian, reviewer J. Oliver Conroy called Panic Attack "a methodical, earnest and often insightful work of reporting and analysis, not a fiery polemic".

In his second book, titled Tech Panic: Why We Shouldn't Fear Facebook and the Future (2021) and published by All Points Books, Soave questions conventional wisdom about the negative effects of social media, and argues that increased regulation of platforms like Twitter and Facebook could stifle free speech and do more harm than good. Dana Perino, the former White House Press Secretary under George W. Bush, described Tech Panic as "a chat with a very smart friend who took the time to think all of these questions through—and who isn't beholden to any one side".

== Personal life ==
Soave lives in Washington, D.C. In October 2014, Soave married his wife Carrie. (Note: For the post, see Soave, Robby [@robbysoave8]; (October 2023). "Could not be more overjoyed to celebrate 9 years married to @carriesoave ! The most wonderful woman on earth, and the love of my life. Of course it's actually been a lot longer... we fell in love as high schoolers in the early 00s. There's no one else I'd rather travel the world with. Italy is almost as beautiful as you! 😘" – via Instagram.) They separated sometime after October 2023, and their divorce was finalized in 2024. In July 2025, Soave announced his engagement to a Georgetown University medical student named Jie Jung Shih. (Note: For the post, see Soave, Robby [@robbysoave8]; (July 2, 2025). "Exciting things are happening 💍" – via Instagram.)

== Bibliography ==
- Soave, Robby (2019). Panic Attack: Young Radicals in the Age of Trump. New York, NY: All Points Books. ISBN 9781250169907.
- Soave, Robby (2021). Tech Panic: Why We Shouldn't Fear Facebook and the Future. New York, NY: Threshold Editions. ISBN 9781982159603.
