= The Hill (newspaper) =

American political newspaper and website

- Type: Daily newspaper (when Congress is in session)
- Format: Compact
- Owner: Nexstar Media Group
- Founders: Jerry Finkelstein; Martin Tolchin
- Editor: Bill Sammon
- Managing editor: Ian Swanson
- Photo editor: Greg Nash
- Founded: September 1, 1994; 32 years ago
- Language: English
- Headquarters: 1625 K St., NW, Suite 900, Washington, D.C., 20006 U.S. 38°54′11″N 77°02′15″W
- City: Washington, D.C.
- Country: United States
- Circulation: 24,000 print (as of December 2012)
- ISSN: 1521-1568
- OCLC number: 31153202
- Website: thehill.com

The Hill, formed in 1994, is an American newspaper and digital media company based in Washington, D.C. Focusing on politics, policy, business and international relations, The Hill's coverage includes the U.S. Congress, the presidency and executive branch, and election campaigns, among other topics, describes itself as centrist and nonpartisan.

The company's primary outlet is TheHill.com. It is additionally distributed in print for free around the Washington, D.C., area, and distributed to all congressional offices. It has been owned by Nexstar Media Group since 2021. In 2020, The Hill was ranked second for online politics readership across all news sites, behind only CNN, remaining ahead of Politico, Fox News, NBCNews.com, and MS NOW. As of October 2025, The Hill attracts about 42 million monthly website visits.

== History ==
=== Founding and early years ===
The company was formed as a newspaper in 1994 by power broker and New York businessman Jerry Finkelstein, and Martin Tolchin, a former correspondent for The New York Times. New York Representative Gary L. Ackerman was also a major shareholder. The name of the publication alludes to "Capitol Hill" as a synecdoche for the United States Congress and government generally.

In 2012, James A. Finkelstein assumed control of the organization.

=== Digital distribution and print circulation ===
In 2016, The New York Times reported that The Hill was "proceeding with ambitious expansion plans" to become a national brand publication, and its website traffic increased 126% over the prior year, and was above Politico's traffic for the period.

Following the 2016 U.S. presidential election, The Street reported that The Hill saw the largest increase in online political readership among political news sites, with an increase of 780%. CNN and Politico saw smaller increases over the period, making The Hill "the fastest-growing political news site". In 2017, The Hill was also cited by Twitter as one of the top 10 "most-tweeted" news sources. The Hill under James Finkelstein have seen stories edited to be less critical of U.S. President Donald Trump. A 2017 study by the Berkman Klein Center for Internet & Society at Harvard University found that The Hill was the second most-shared source among supporters of Trump on Twitter during the election, behind Breitbart News.

In 2017, The Hill hired John Solomon as executive vice president of digital video. Solomon inserted material from advertisers into journalistic copy, leading to protests from The Hill's publisher. In March 2018, he worked closely with associates of Rudy Giuliani, the personal lawyer of President Trump, to promote the spurious Biden–Ukraine conspiracy theory. In May 2018, Solomon's role was changed to opinion contributor, although he was allowed to keep his original title. In September 2019, he left The Hill.

As of 2018, The Hill was the second most-viewed American political news website and the third-most tweeted U.S. news source.

In January 2019, CNN reported that current and former staff said Finkelstein interfered in the editorial independence of the paper by "keeping a watchful eye on the newspaper's coverage to ensure it is not too critical" of President Trump.

In 2019, The Hill was ranked second among all American news sites for political readership, second to CNN, and ahead of Capitol Hill competitors such as Politico.

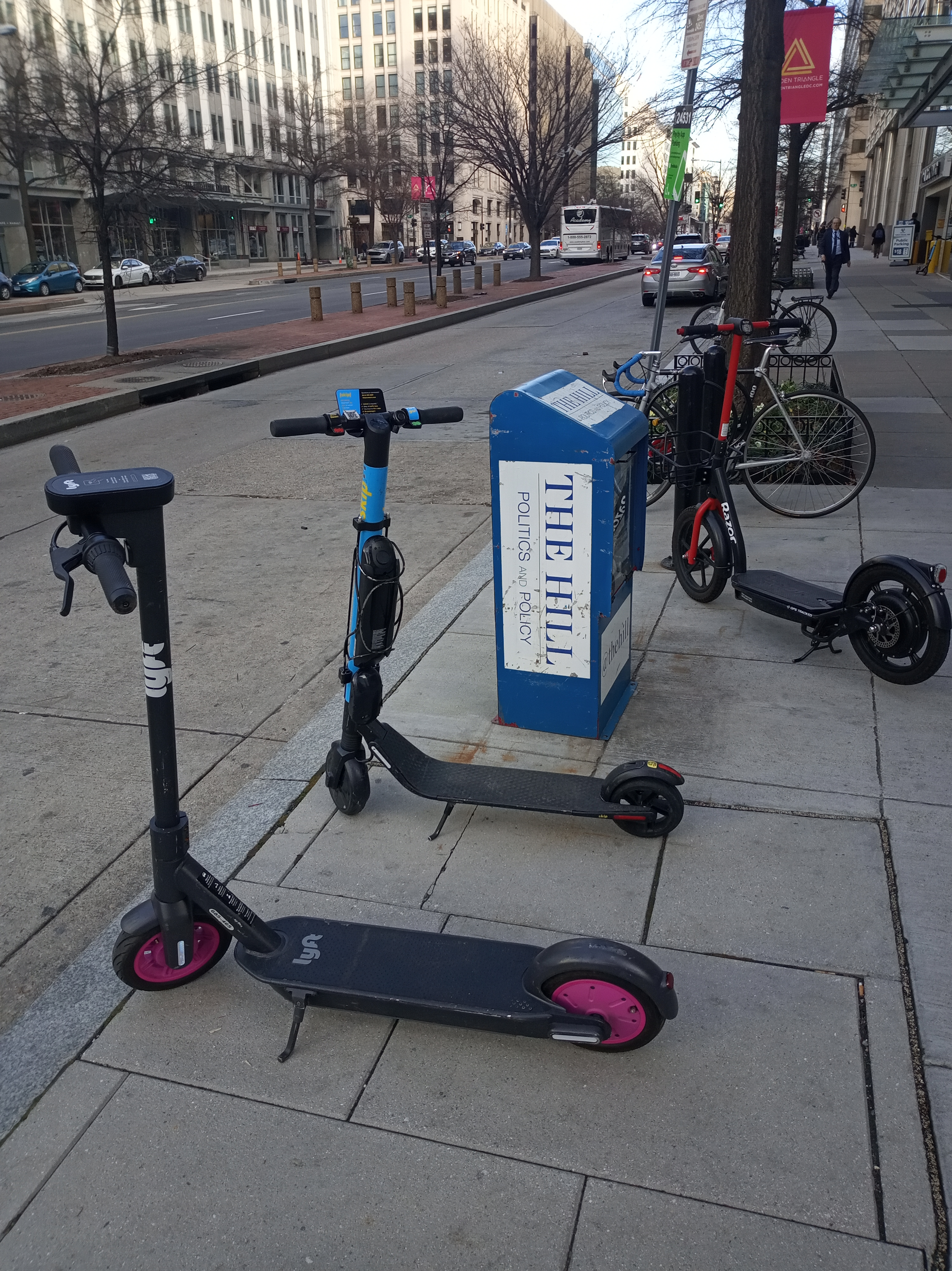
Vending box for The Hill on K Street

In 2020, it was again ranked second for online politics readership across all news sites, behind only CNN. It remained ahead of Politico, Fox News, NBCNews.com and MSNBC.

As of 2020, the newspaper claims to have more than 22,000 print readers. The Hill is distributed for free in newspaper boxes around the U.S. Capitol building and mailed directly to all congressional offices.

As of 2020, The Hill's YouTube channel had 1,100,000 subscribers, ahead of Politico, Axios, and Bloomberg Politics. In October 2020, The Hill's YouTube channel averaged over 1.5 million daily video views and more than 10 million per week; in September 2020 it received over 340 million video views.

In 2021, The Hill was acquired by Nexstar Media Group for $130 million.

In 2022, The Hill was accused of censorship after firing Katie Halper for a segment supporting Rashida Tlaib's labeling of Israel as an "apartheid government". In 2024, Briahna Joy Gray was fired after appearing to roll her eyes while discussing the allegations of sexual violence against Israeli hostages during an interview with the sister of an Israeli who was abducted by Hamas in the October 7 attacks.

Between September 2024 and September 2025, The Hill's overall social media traffic increased by 20 percent, with the newspaper noting increased political engagement and more frequent video posting by its reporters.

== Features and editions ==
=== The Hill TV ===
In June 2018, The Hill launched Hill.TV, a digital news channel. Four years later, the channel expanded to a FAST streaming service and was rebranded as The Hill TV. It is distributed by Haystack, LG, Amazon Fire and Prime, Samsung, Roku, and Vizio. Programming includes Rising, a morning news program hosted by Robby Soave four days a week (initially by Krystal Ball and Buck Sexton). In May 2021, long-time hosts Ball and Saagar Enjeti announced they were departing in order to release their own independent project, Breaking Points with Krystal and Saagar.

=== NewsNation ===
Since Nexstar's acquisition of The Hill, branded programming has appeared on Nexstar's cable news channel, NewsNation. Starting on April 24, 2023, The Hill appears as a weekday afternoon program on NewsNation, moderated by Leland Vittert and with panel discussion featuring Chris Stirewalt, George Will, Johanna Maska, Niall Stanage, or other rotating panelists. NewsNation's chief Washington correspondent, Blake Burman, took over moderation duties in August 2023 and Mick Mulvaney and Sean Spicer joined the list of rotating panelists. The Hill also airs on SiriusXM immediately following its live broadcast.

On March 3, 2024, The Hill Sunday launched. Hosted by Stirewalt, it is a Sunday morning talk show focusing on Washington politics. On April 7, 2024, the show was offered to The CW network stations and local stations owned by Nexstar.

=== Notable stories and awards ===
The National Press Club's annual Sandy Hume Memorial Award is named after staffer Sandy Hume, in recognition of his 1997 reporting in The Hill of an attempted Republican coup against then-speaker Newt Gingrich.

Climate and energy reporters Sharon Udasin and Rachel Frazin were recognized with SEAL Awards for environmental journalism in 2022 and 2023.

== Staff ==
=== Masthead ===
- Joe Ruffolo, general manager
- Bob Cusack, editor-in-chief

=== Past ===
- James Carville
- Ron Christie
- Judd Gregg
- Gen. Michael Hayden (ret.) (former NSA and CIA director)
- David Keene
- Josh Marshall
- Dick Morris
- John Solomon
- A. B. Stoddard
- Byron York
