= Now with Alex Wagner =

- Title card
- Presented by: Alex Wagner
- Country of origin: United States

Production
- Executive producer: Dana Haller
- Production location: New York City
- Running time: 60 minutes

Original release
- Network: MSNBC
- Release: November 14, 2011 – July 31, 2015

Now with Alex Wagner (stylized NOW) is a political opinion program on MSNBC presented by progressive host Alex Wagner. The show debuted on November 14, 2011, and aired on weekdays at noon ET. Starting on January 13, 2014, Now aired at 4 P.M. due to the resignation of former MSNBC host Martin Bashir.

On July 30, 2015, MSNBC President, Phil Griffin announced that the series had been cancelled in an effort to transition the network's daytime programming to more breaking news reporting and less political commentary and opinion. The program aired its final episode on July 31, 2015.

== Format ==
Now utilized a panel format for a majority of the show featuring correspondents and special guests that analyze and break down the most important stories of the day with Wagner serving as both moderator and anchor. The focus was generally political, but also included breaking stories and pop culture. The program also featured branded special segments. Instead of the traditional daytime "news crawl" at the bottom of the screen, Now featured a Twitter feed that displays tweets from various news organizations, reporters, and other relevant organizations and individuals regarding the story being discussed at the time.

=== Special segments ===
- The Bullpen: Was a conversation with another MSNBC personality about the news of the day.
- Post Script (P.S.): Was a short editorial segment that featured Wagner's opinion on an important issue or news story.

== History ==
Now was created to replace the 12:00PM hour of MSNBC Live, which was hosted by Contessa Brewer until August 2011. Between Brewer's departure and Now's debut, MSNBC Live's noon hour was presented by rotating fill-in anchors. Wagner was the third MSNBC personality in quick succession to be announced as host of a new show on the network. Al Sharpton's PoliticsNation and Chris Hayes's Up also debuted in the three months prior to Now's premiere.
