= Alex Witt Reports =

American news TV program

- Also known as: Weekends with Alex Witt (2011–2021)
- Genre: News
- Presented by: Alex Witt
- Country of origin: United States

Production
- Executive producer: Nick Kovijanic
- Production location: New York City
- Running time: 180 minutes

Original release
- Network: MSNBC
- Release: September 17, 2011 – November 9, 2025
- Network: MS NOW
- Release: November 15, 2025 – September 6, 2026

Related
- MS NOW Reports

Alex Witt Reports (formerly Weekends with Alex Witt) is a news program on MS NOW anchored by Alex Witt that aired from September 17, 2011 until September 6, 2026. The program originally premiered as Weekends with Alex Witt and aired at noon for 3 hours, handing off to MSNBC Live (4–5 p.m.) In 2023, then-president Rashida Jones announced that the program would be cut to just one hour on Sundays, to make room for a new program hosted by Jen Psaki in the 12 p.m. timeslot. The two-hour block on Saturdays remained unchanged. As of January 2024, the program was being broadcast from 1–4 p.m. ET on weekends.

Witt previously anchored the weekend edition of MSNBC Live. When MSNBC announced that regular contributor Chris Hayes would be hosting a new weekend talk show, she was given a branded program as part of the network's new weekend morning lineup. Weekends with Alex Witt and Up with Chris Hayes debuted on September 17, 2011.

In a 2015 realignment of MSNBC's daytime lineup, Weekends was removed from the lineup, but Witt maintained her time slot under the MSNBC Live banner. The Weekends branding was later reinstated. In March 2021, it was announced that the program would be rebranded as Alex Witt Reports, reintegrating it with the MSNBC Live programs under a new standard MSNBC Reports brand.

On June 26, 2026, it was announced that Witt would be departing MS NOW later in the year, and Antonia Hylton would succeed her as host of a new program in Witt's timeslot. Witt's program ended on September 6, 2026, with Hylton's new show The Assignment with Antonia Hylton premiering the following weekend.

Preceded by Velshi	MSNBC Weekend Lineup; 1:00 pm – 4:00 pm (ET)	Succeeded by: The Beat Weekend (Saturday); Deadline: White House: Weekend (Sunday)
