= PoliticsNation with Al Sharpton =

American political news program

- Presented by: Al Sharpton
- Country of origin: United States
- Original language: English

Production
- Executive producer: Moshe Arenstein
- Production location: New York City (2011–present)
- Running time: 60 minutes

Original release
- Network: MSNBC
- Release: August 29, 2011 – November 9, 2025
- Network: MS NOW
- Release: November 15, 2025 – present

PoliticsNation with Al Sharpton is an American political news program broadcast on MS NOW, hosted by Rev. Al Sharpton. It began on August 29, 2011, on MSNBC's weekday 6 PM slot.

== History ==
=== 6 PM slot prior to renaming ===
PoliticsNation was the formal renaming of the 6 PM weekday slot that had been occupied by a broadcast named MSNBC Live (sharing the same "generic" title as the primary morning-to-afternoon rolling-news program primarily staffed by anchors.) Sharpton had served as host of the slot since July, and was preceded by Cenk Uygur from January to June. Prior to Uygur, the slot had been occupied by The Ed Show from April 6, 2009, to January 24, 2011 (eventually moving to the 10 PM slot following Keith Olbermann's departure from MSNBC), and by 1600 Pennsylvania Avenue from March 17, 2008 (as Race to the White House) to April 3, 2009.

=== Al Sharpton and MSNBC ===
Sharpton's involvement with MSNBC began after June 29, 2011, when he became the primary substitute host for The Ed Show, leading to press speculation that Sharpton could attain his own series on the network in the vein of Rachel Maddow (who attained her own series in 2008 after serving as Keith Olbermann's primary substitute host on Countdown with Keith Olbermann), Lawrence O'Donnell (who attained his own series in 2010 after having served as Olbermann's primary substitute host) and Chris Hayes (who attained his own weekend series beginning in mid-September 2011 after having served as a regular fill-in for both Maddow, Olbermann, and O'Donnell before attaining his weekday series in April 2013).

In August 2015, it was announced that the series would move to just once a week on Sundays at 8AM starting on October 4, 2015. The series aired its final weekday episode on September 4, 2015. In October, 2020, PoliticsNation was rescheduled to Saturdays and Sundays, airing at 5:00 p.m. Eastern Time both days.

== Reception ==
After beginning his appearances as substitute host for Ed Schultz, conservative commentators and outlets slammed MSNBC's decision to hire Sharpton as a contributor (and even more so after becoming host of what became PoliticsNation); EURweb cited mockery of Sharpton by such far-right outlets as Breitbart.tv in particular, doubts were raised by at least one member of the National Association of Black Journalists about Sharpton's ability to host a credible political talk show following past controversial comments, and criticism by African-American journalists raised the possibility of MSNBC having hired Sharpton in order to draw ratings. In response, Tamika Mallory, executive director of the National Action Network (which is headed by Sharpton as president) rebutted many of the criticisms in an editorial for TV One's NewsOne website, and also likened black criticism of MSNBC's decision to "crabs in a barrel".

== Parody ==
Sharpton's style of delivery, verbalized understanding of topics on PoliticsNation and a live flub with the teleprompter have been the subject of parody, especially on NBC series Saturday Night Live with Kenan Thompson playing Sharpton. It was the subject of a December 10, 2011 skit parodying the flub as well as a May 19, 2012 skit with guest star Mick Jagger as a JPMorgan Chase executive. Sharpton himself enjoyed the skits, and had Thompson on his show in February 2015. Sharpton returned the favor by appearing on SNL in March 2016.

Preceded by: The Beat Weekend (Saturday); Deadline: White House Weekend (Sunday)	MS NOW Weekend Lineup; 5:00 pm – 6:00 pm	Succeeded by The Weekend: Primetime
