= Velshi (TV program) =

- Genre: Weekend news show
- Presented by: Ali Velshi
- Country of origin: United States
- Original language: English

Production
- Executive producer: Rebekah Dryden
- Production location: New York City
- Camera setup: Multi-camera
- Running time: 120 minutes

Original release
- Network: MSNBC
- Release: February 15, 2020 – November 9, 2025
- Network: MS NOW
- Release: November 15, 2025 – June 7, 2026

Related
- Up with David Gura

Velshi is a weekend morning news program hosted by Ali Velshi that aired from 10 a.m. to 1 p.m. on Saturdays and Sundays on MS NOW. The program debuted on February 15, 2020, displacing Up with David Gura.

Prior to the program's debut, Velshi co-hosted a weekday afternoon program titled Velshi & Ruhle, alongside Stephanie Ruhle, which began on May 20, 2017. In 2019, the Velshi & Ruhle segment "Trump: 'Looking Very Seriously' at Changing Transgender Definition" was nominated in the "Outstanding TV Journalism Segment" category at the 30th GLAAD Media Awards. Following an MSNBC shakeup in December 2019, Velshi & Ruhle was cancelled.

Velshi's 2020 debut coincided with MSNBC's hiring of Alicia Menendez as a weekend anchor.

In March 2026, it was announced that Velshi will move to The 11th Hour, and that Jacob Soboroff will host a new program in his former time slot, Connect with Jacob Soboroff. Velshi officially ended on June 7, 2026, with executive producer Rebekah Dryden also moving with Velshi.

Preceded by The Weekend	MS NOW Weekend Lineup; 10:00AM – 1:00PM	Succeeded by Alex Witt Reports
