= MS NOW Reports =

American television news program

- Also known as: MSNBC Reports (until 2025); MSNBC Live (until 2021)
- Presented by: Various anchors, see below
- Country of origin: United States

Production
- Executive producer: Nick Kovijanic
- Production locations: Secaucus, New Jersey (1996–2007) 30 Rockefeller Plaza, New York City (until 2025): Studio 3K (2011–2016); Studio 4E (Ana Cabrera, Katy Tur) (2016–2025); Studio 3C (2016–2021); Studio 3A (Chris Jansing, Alex Witt) (2021–2025); 229 West 43rd Street, New York City (2025–2026): Studio 9A (Ana Cabrera); Studio 9C (Chris Jansing, Katy Tur, Alex Witt)
- Running time: 6 hours each weekday (with commercials); 3 hours each weekend day (with commercials)

Original release
- Network: MSNBC
- Release: July 15, 1996 – November 14, 2025
- Network: MS NOW
- Release: November 15, 2025 – September 6, 2026

MS NOW Reports (formerly MSNBC Reports) was the branding used for daytime rolling news blocks broadcast by the American cable news channel MS NOW.

The blocks primarily aired as part of MS NOW's daytime lineup; the program—then known as MSNBC Live—first began to air more frequently in 2015, as part of efforts by the network president Andrew Lack to move personality-based opinion programming out of its weekday daytime schedule in favor of more live news coverage. In 2021, the blocks were rebranded as MSNBC Reports, and began to carry the name of their anchor in their branding (such as Alex Witt Reports). The naming scheme was patterned after its existing daytime program Andrea Mitchell Reports.

Until 2026, MS NOW Reports occupied most of the channel's daytime lineup on weekdays and weekends. On June 15, 2026, MS NOW began to phase out the Reports branding in favor of new personality-based shows, premiering Money, Power, Politics with Stephanie Ruhle, On the Line with Alicia Menendez, and rebranding Katy Tur Reports as The Moment with Katy Tur, leaving only an 11:00 a.m. ET hour on weekdays with rotating anchors, and Alex Witt Reports from 1:00 p.m. to 4:00 p.m. ET on weekends. The 11 a.m. hour was then replaced by State of Play with Peter Alexander on August 10, 2026, and Alex Witt Reports was replaced by The Assignment with Antonia Hylton on September 12, 2026.

== Background ==
MS NOW Reports is the name of several hours of straight news programming on the network (both weekdays and weekends), similar to what is known as "dayside" programming on other cable news channels. Beginning in 2009, MSNBC began to fill in these hours with more analysis- or opinion-oriented news programming. During the network's pivot back to hard news in 2015, the name, then-MSNBC Live, returned during daytime hours. The brand is also used during holidays and as fill-in programming when a show ends or is canceled until a new show is ready.

== History ==
=== MSNBC Live ===
The program aired at various times through the years, but most recently aired Saturdays from 2-4 p.m. ET, and Sundays from 3-4 p.m. ET until late 2014, when the program's anchor, Craig Melvin, was reassigned, seeing the end of the program.

After Andrew Lack became chairman of the NBC News Group in 2015, MSNBC began to remove opinion-driven programs from its daytime lineup in favor of more live news programming. Thomas Roberts was appointed to a new weekday time slot from 1-3 p.m. ET under the Live branding, beginning on March 2. Later in August 2015 and September 2015, MSNBC Live was extended to 1-7 p.m. ET, replacing the canceled The Cycle, Now with Alex Wagner, The Ed Show, and moved-to-weekends PoliticsNation.

On October 5, 2015, José Díaz-Balart's morning program, The Daily Rundown, and Tamron Hall's show of five years, NewsNation, were reverted to the Live branding, airing at 9:00 a.m. ET and 11:00 a.m ET, respectively. In July 2016, Díaz-Balart left MSNBC to begin his new duties as Saturday anchor of the NBC Nightly News. He was succeeded by Weekend Today anchor Craig Melvin. On December 15, 2016, Thomas Roberts was removed from the 3:00 p.m. ET hour.

In January 2017, Hallie Jackson and Katy Tur were announced as the new anchors for the 9:00 a.m. ET and 2:00 p.m. ET hours respectively. In February 2017, Tamron Hall departed from MSNBC and Today. In March 2017, MSNBC began to increase its use of NBC News branding during its daytime programming (including on sets and graphics), in order to emphasize its leverage of the division's resources. In April 2017, Kate Snow left the network, electing to focus more on long-form reporting and her role as a Sunday anchor for the NBC Nightly News. Steve Kornacki's 4 p.m. ET hour was replaced on May 8, 2017, with Deadline: White House, a new program hosted by Nicolle Wallace.

In 2020, Ali Velshi moved from the daytime lineup to weekend mornings, replacing David Gura's Up. Gura moved to a Saturday afternoon MSNBC Live block. On March 2, 2020, the 7 p.m. ET hour was filled with rotating anchors due to Chris Matthews' resignation from Hardball; this continued until the July 20 premiere of The ReidOut with Joy Reid.

On August 19, 2020, coinciding with the 2020 Democratic National Convention, MSNBC's weekday daytime lineup underwent a re-alignment: MTP Daily was moved to 1 p.m. ET, Deadline: White House expanded to two hours, and Ayman Mohyeldin (host of Morning Joe First Look) began hosting the 3 p.m. ET hour. David Gura left the network in November 2020.

=== MSNBC Reports (2021–25) ===
MSNBC Reports logo until 2025

On March 29, 2021, as part of a wider rebranding of the channel, MSNBC rebranded most of its daytime programming under the blanket title MSNBC Reports, with the individual blocks being branded with the anchor's name. The new branding was patterned after the existing MSNBC daytime program Andrea Mitchell Reports (which was folded into the Reports block as a result), and was introduced as part of an effort by new MSNBC president Rashida Jones to achieve a clearer separation between MSNBC's news-driven daytime lineup and opinion-based primetime programming.

On September 7, 2021, it was announced that José Díaz-Balart would return to MSNBC Reports hosting the 10 a.m. ET hour, while Hallie Jackson moved to the 3 p.m. ET hour, and Ayman Mohyeldin moved from weekdays to weekend evenings, replacing The Week with Joshua Johnson.

During 2021 and 2022, the weekend morning block of MSNBC Reports, formerly anchored by Kendis Gibson and Lindsey Reiser, was replaced by repeats of MSNBC on Peacock's Zerlina anchored by Zerlina Maxwell, The Mehdi Hasan Show anchored by Mehdi Hasan, as well as the launch of The Katie Phang Show, anchored by Katie Phang, which premiered on April 9, 2022.

During the week of February 28, 2022, coinciding with the 2022 State of the Union address, Craig Melvin Reports was temporarily replaced by White House Reports—which was hosted by NBC News White House correspondents Peter Alexander and Kristen Welker. On March 14, 2022, it was announced that Craig Melvin would step down from his program to focus on NBC's flagship morning show Today as of April 1.

On April 4, 2022, after she was named the new host of The 11th Hour following the departure of Brian Williams, Stephanie Ruhle's 9 a.m. ET hour was replaced with a fourth hour of Morning Joe. On May 7, 2022, the weekend block of MSNBC Reports was reduced by an hour with the premiere of Symone as a new 4 p.m. ET show. On June 6, 2022, MTP Daily was moved to NBC News Now as Meet the Press Now, with Chris Jansing taking over his former 1 p.m. ET hour.

On January 12, 2023, it was announced that Hallie Jackson will leave her 3 p.m. ET hour to focus on her NBC News Now show, while Chris Jansing's 1 p.m. ET hour would expand by a second hour to 3 p.m. ET, Katy Tur’s 2 p.m. ET hour would move to Jackson's 3 p.m. ET hour, and José Díaz-Balart’s 10 a.m. ET hour would move to Craig Melvin's former 11 a.m. ET hour. The changes took effect on February 13.

On February 21, 2023, MSNBC announced that the noon hour of Alex Witt Reports on Sunday mornings would be replaced by Inside with Jen Psaki, beginning March 19.

On April 10, 2023, former CNN Newsroom anchor Ana Cabrera debuted in the 10 a.m. ET hour of MSNBC Reports, which had been left without a permanent anchor after José Díaz-Balart’s move to the 11 a.m. ET hour in February.

On November 30, 2023, as part of a programming change effective on January 13, 2024, MSNBC announced that Alex Witt Reports would air between 1 p.m. and 4 p.m. ET on weekends, ending Yasmin Vossoughian's MSNBC Reports block.

On October 29, 2024, it was announced that Andrea Mitchell would leave her 12 p.m. hour in January 2025 to focus more on her role as an NBC News Chief Foreign Affairs and Chief Washington correspondent. Her final show would air on February 7, 2025.

On February 24, 2025, as part of a schedule revamp by new MSNBC president Rebecca Kutler, it was announced that José Díaz-Balart would leave his 11 a.m. ET hour, while Ana Cabrera, Chris Jansing, and Katy Tur expanded their shows to two hours each, with Cabrera's show airing from 10 a.m. ET to 12 p.m. ET, Jansing's show from 12 p.m. ET to 2 p.m. ET and covering the 12 p.m. ET hour previously anchored by Andrea Mitchell, and Tur's show from 2 p.m. ET to 4 p.m. ET.

=== MS NOW Reports (2025–26) ===
With the November 15, 2025 rebranding of MSNBC as MS NOW, the Reports branding was retained with the amended title MS NOW Reports.

On June 15, 2026, MS NOW began to move away from the Reports branding by revamping its daytime lineup: Ana Cabrera Reports and Chris Jansing Reports were discontinued, the network introduced the new 9–11 a.m. block Money, Power, Politics with Stephanie Ruhle, the new Noon–2 p.m. block On the Line with Alicia Menendez, and rebranded Katy Tur Reports as The Moment with Katy Tur. The 11 a.m. hour was filled by rotating anchors under the MS NOW Reports branding until August 10, 2026, when it was replaced by the new show State of Play with Peter Alexander.

On June 26, 2026, it was announced that Alex Witt would leave MS NOW later in the year, and that Antonia Hylton—formerly of The Weekend: Primetime (which was concurrently cancelled as part of other changes to the network's weekend programming)—would host a new program in her former 1–4 p.m. timeslot; the program was later announced as The Assignment with Antonia Hylton, which premiered on September 12. Former The Weekend: Primetime executive producer Joy Fowlin also moved to Hylton's new block. The final edition of Alex Witt Reports aired on September 6, 2026, ending the MS NOW Reports programming blocks.

== Format ==
An hour of MS NOW Reports opens with a tease leading into the top story of the hour. Political developments and breaking news stories are given priority airtime at the beginning of each broadcast, while less-significant stories follow afterwards. Each broadcast typically ends with a segment on good news, before kicking off to the next hour of news coverage or to the first hour of Deadline: White House. MS NOW Reports programming stands in stark contrast to the rest of the network's analysis and opinion-driven lineup; upon the conclusion of the weekday news block, non-political breaking news stories are typically deprioritized.

During special coverage of the multiple indictments, arraignments, trials, and impeachments of former President Donald J. Trump, MSNBC Reports transformed its typical graphics, programming, and anchors lineup to accommodate the developments. During special programming for these events, the network typically schedules two blocks of special coverage with a panel of two to three MSNBC anchors hosting, each block lasting two-four hours. The first block, lasting from 10:00 a.m. to 12:00 p.m. ET, would and have previously been anchored by Ana Cabrera and José Díaz-Balart. The second block, covering from 12:00 p.m. to 4:00 p.m. ET, also would be anchored and previously by Andrea Mitchell, Chris Jansing, and Katy Tur.

During special coverage of the attempted assassination of then-presidential candidate Donald Trump in 2024, MSNBC suspended regular rolling news programming and simulcast NBC News and NBC News Now coverage, preempting MSNBC Reports, Morning Joe and Way Too Early. NBC News stated that the single broadcast was employed due to the "gravity and complexity" of the situation, while it was reported that MSNBC staff were concerned over the possibility that a Morning Joe panelist or guest could make insensitive remarks regarding the assassination attempt.

Following Joe Biden's withdrawal from the 2024 presidential election, the network broadcast special editions of MSNBC Reports featuring its lead commentators on July 22, 2024, such as Katy Tur, Rachel Maddow, Chris Jansing and Al Sharpton.

=== Former anchors ===
- Kendis Gibson - departed MSNBC for CBS Miami; his weekend hour was replaced with Morning Joe: Weekend on Saturdays in 2023
- Lindsey Reiser - departed MSNBC for CBS News in 2024, after serving as a fill-in anchor after her weekend hour was replaced with The Katie Phang Show during the anchor’s maternity leave between 2022 and 2023
- Stephanie Ruhle - now anchor of the daytime program Money, Power, Politics; her weekday hour was replaced with an expanded fourth hour of Morning Joe as she moved off of the MSNBC Reports lineup to weeknights as the anchor of The 11th Hour following the departure of Brian Williams before returning to dayside with a panel format
- Craig Melvin - departed MSNBC in order to focus on NBC's morning program, Today
- Ali Velshi - moved to weekends to anchor Velshi, a two-hour weekend morning program. Now the host of The 11th Hour
- Ayman Mohyeldin - moved to weekends to anchor Ayman, a weekend evening program; his hour was taken over by Hallie Jackson
- Hallie Jackson - departed MSNBC as part of an expansion of her NBC News Now show, Hallie Jackson Now; her hour was taken over by Katy Tur
- Yasmin Vossoughian now a national correspondent for MSNBC after having left weekend anchor duties as part of a broader overhaul of MSNBC weekend programming; her hours were taken over by Alex Witt
- Andrea Mitchell - departed MSNBC to focus more on her role as an NBC News Chief Washington and Chief Foreign Affairs Correspondent; her hour was taken over by Chris Jansing
- José Díaz-Balart - departed MSNBC ahead of its spinoff of parent, Versant, from NBCUniversal and the ensuing end of operations at the Miami bureau; currently anchoring the Saturday edition of NBC Nightly News; his hour was taken over by Ana Cabrera
- Chris Jansing - named MS NOW's Chief Political Reporter. Her two-hour program at 12 p.m. was replaced by On the Line with Alicia Menendez on June 15, 2026
- Ana Cabrera - departed MS NOW in June 2026 after three years with the network following the cancellation of Ana Cabrera Reports
- Katy Tur - remains an anchor with MS NOW; her 2pm show was renamed The Moment with Katy Tur on June 15, 2026 and continues to air in the same two-hour timeslot
- Alex Witt - departed MS NOW in September 2026 following the end of Alex Witt Reports; retired

When a regular weekday anchor for a Reports hour is unavailable, the weekend anchor, Alex Witt, or if unavailable, a substitute anchor will substitute in. On weekends, a substitute anchor will fill-in for the regular weekend anchor. Substitute anchors for the program include Richard Lui, Erin O’Hearn, Ali Vitali, Antonia Hylton, and Erielle Reshef.

== See also ==
- CNN News Central and CNN Newsroom
- America's Newsroom (Fox News)

Preceded by Morning Joe	MS NOW Weekday Lineup; 9:00 am – 4:00 pm	Succeeded by Deadline: White House	
Preceded by Velshi	MS NOW Weekday Lineup; 9:00 am – 4:00 pm	MS NOW Weekend Lineup; 1:00 pm – 4:00 pm	Succeeded by The Beat: Weekend (Saturday); Deadline White House: Weekend (Sunday)
