= Daniel Arnall =

American news executive

- Occupation: Vice President of News Standards
- Employer: NBC News

Daniel Arnall is a television news executive currently serving as a leader of news standards at NBC News. Prior to his current role he was the executive in charge of News Programming (MSNBC Reports) at MSNBC (from 2021 until 2024), as well as executive producing the Nightly News franchise on weekends for NBC News. Arnall previously ran the editorial operations at Bloomberg Television's US channel, and was previously a senior producer for business coverage at ABC News, and the senior producer for domestic news at World News with Diane Sawyer. He won an Edward R. Murrow award for MSNBC's coverage of the January 6 Insurrection and an Emmy Award for coverage of troubled pension systems in the United States. Arnall is a graduate of the University of Missouri's School of Journalism and the Graduate School of Journalism at Columbia University.
