= ED TV =

ED TV or Ed TV may refer to

- EDtv, a 1999 American comedy film directed by Ron Howard
- Ed (TV series), an NBC comedy/drama starring Tom Cavanagh
- The Ed Show, an MSNBC show hosted by Ed Schultz
- Enhanced-definition television, American shorthand for certain digital television (DTV) formats and devices
- Dubai TV, United Arab Emirates channel formerly known as Emirates Dubai Television
