= Ana Cabrera =

American journalist

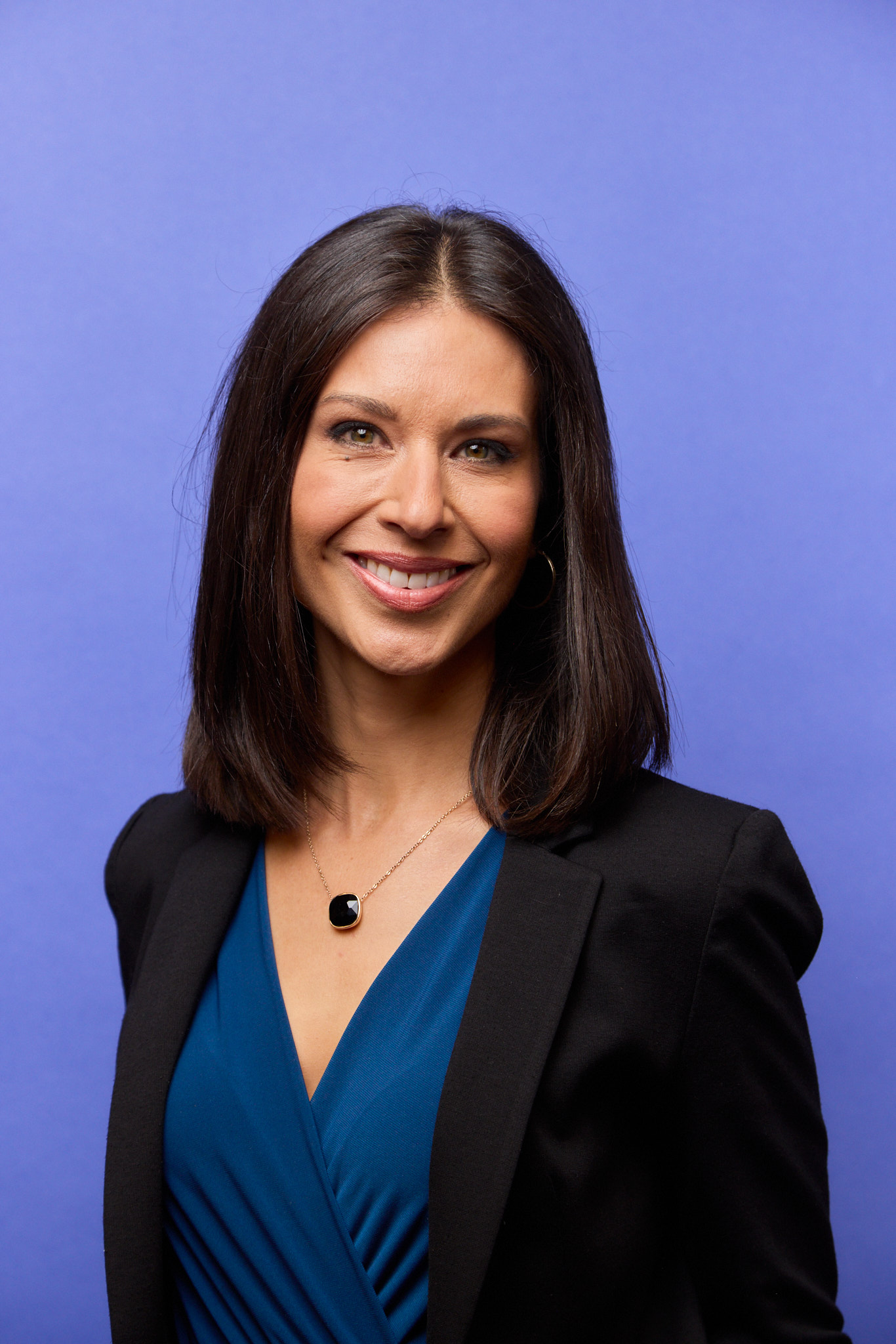
- Cabrera in 2025
- Born: May 13, 1982 (age 44)
- Education: Washington State University (BA)
- Occupation: Journalist
- Television: KHQ-TV; KMGH-TV; CNN; MS NOW
- Spouse: Benjamin Nielsen
- Children: 2

Ana Cabrera (born May 13, 1982) is an American television journalist. From 2013 to 2022, she worked as a reporter and anchor for CNN and MS NOW.

== Biography ==
Cabrera was raised in a Mexican-American family in Denver and then graduated from Washington State University, where she was a standout athlete on the Washington State Cougars track and field team. After school, she worked for NBC affiliate KHQ-TV in Spokane, Washington.

She returned to her home town to work as the morning news anchor at KMGH-TV Channel 7 News in Denver where she earned an Emmy Award for in-the-field reporting as part of a news team covering the High Park fire in 2012. The morning team was also awarded the Associated Press TV and Radio Association's Annual Mark Twain Award for Best Morning Show Broadcast in 2013.

In 2013, Cabrera joined CNN as a correspondent in Denver. She served on the CNN Investigative team. In March 2017, she was named anchor of CNN's weekend edition of CNN Newsroom, succeeding Poppy Harlow. She covered stories including the unrest in Ferguson, Missouri in the aftermath of the shooting death of Michael Brown, the Unite the Right rally of white supremacists in Charlottesville, immigration, marijuana legalization, and the 2017 London Bridge attack. In May 2021, she began anchoring a one-hour weekday afternoon slot of CNN Newsroom.

On December 1, 2022, it was reported that Cabrera was expected to leave the network and join NBC News. Two weeks later, Cabrera confirmed the report stating, "My heart is full of gratitude for the incredible opportunities I've had at CNN to serve our viewers and to work alongside extraordinary journalists ... But after nearly a decade at CNN, I'm making the personal decision to explore a new professional chapter. Time to embrace new challenges and opportunities." Her last broadcast on CNN aired on December 22.

On April 10, 2023, Cabrera began as the anchor for the 10 a.m. hour block of MSNBC Reports. On May 5, 2025, her block was expanded to two hours following the exit of José Díaz-Balart's MSNBC block, ahead of their spin-off from NBCUniversal.

On March 18, 2026, it was reported that Cabrera will be leaving MS NOW, amongst other programming changes to take effect in June. In a post on X that same day, Cabrera said it was entirely her decision, stating "I am truly grateful for my time at MS NOW, for my wonderful colleagues, my amazing team that works so hard every day, and for you, the viewers who’ve put your trust in me to serve you through this most meaningful work."

== Personal life ==
Cabrera is married to Benjamin Nielsen; they have two children.

A runner, she ran and completed the 2022 New York City Marathon in 2:57:11, finishing 525th out of 47,745 finishers. She was the 16th-place runner in the women's mass race and the 42nd women's finisher overall.

Cabrera is a member of the National Association of Hispanic Journalists and serves on the board of directors of Mi Casa Resource Center. She has also served on the board of the American Cancer Society.
