= Alex Witt =

American television journalist

- Born: Alexandra E. Witt; April 9, 1961 (age 65); Pasadena, California, U.S.
- Education: University of Southern California
- Occupation: Television anchor
- Years active: 1990–present
- Spouse: Bill Sorensen

Alexandra E. Witt (born April 9, 1961) is an American television journalist. She joined MSNBC in 1999 and became the longest-serving anchor for the network. She hosted weekend news programming for the network, notably, Alex Witt Reports on MS NOW, where she also previously hosted MSNBC Live and Morning Joe First Look. She is currently a fill-in daytime anchor on MS NOW through the end of 2026.

== Early life and education ==
Witt was born in Pasadena, California, and grew up in the Hancock Park neighborhood of Los Angeles. Her father, Charles B. Witt, worked as noted thoracic surgeon in Los Angeles. She attended the Marlborough School for Girls in Los Angeles and graduated from the University of Southern California, where she studied journalism and international relations.

== Career ==
Witt began her television career as a field producer for local Los Angeles stations KCBS-TV and KNBC-TV. She next became a field producer for NBC's Today in Burbank, California. There, she was advised to become a news anchor. Her first on-air position was at KCBA in Salinas, California, where she worked as a reporter from 1990 to 1992. She left her job to raise her child. When her husband began working for CBS News, and devastated by the coverage of TWA Flight 800, Witt resumed her anchoring career. She was hired as a freelance reporter at New York City's WNYW-TV from 1996 to 1998.

In 1999, Witt was hired by MSNBC as an overnight anchor by Eric Sorenson, then MSNBC's general manager, whom Witt had known at KCBS. During her time, she was a frequent substitute news anchor for the MSNBC Live news block on weekdays. In August 2011, she began anchoring the program Weekends with Alex Witt. In 2021, it was rebranded as Alex Witt Reports.

On June 26, 2026, MS NOW announced that Witt would leave her regular anchor role later that same year. Her last broadcast of Alex Witt Reports was on September 6, 2026, ending 27 years as an anchor at the network. Antonia Hylton succeeded her in the weekend time slot with The Assignment. Witt is expected to make occasional daytime appearances on MS NOW through the end of 2026.

== Personal life ==
Witt is married to TV producer Bill Sorensen.

She was a former member of the all-female rock band Mrs. Robinson. In 2001, the group released its debut album and performed at several venues, including a performance of the national anthem at Shea Stadium before a New York Mets versus Philadelphia Philliesgame. In a 2018 interview with Politico, Witt said that she is a distant cousin to George Washington, seven generations removed.

== See also ==
- New Yorkers in journalism
