= Twilight of the Elites =

2012 book by Chris Hayes

Twilight of the Elites: America After Meritocracy
- Hardcover edition
- Author: Chris Hayes
- Language: English
- Subject: Politics, sociology
- Publisher: Crown Publishing
- Publication date: June 12, 2012
- Publication place: United States
- Media type: Print, e-book
- Pages: 304
- ISBN: 9780307720450
- Dewey Decimal: 305.5/20973
- LC Class: HN90.E4 H39 2012

Twilight of the Elites: America After Meritocracy is a 2012 nonfiction book written by Christopher Hayes, discussing examples of how meritocracy is exploited in modern America. He argues that there are many competing forces working within America that are causing the financial crisis, elite crisis, media crisis, and, what he sees as the most ominous problem facing the globe, the environmental global warming crisis.

Kirkus Reviews called the book "forcefully written" and "provocative". Aaron Swartz described the book as "compellingly readable, impossibly erudite, and—most stunningly of all—correct".

The book has been reviewed by sources such as The New York Times, Rolling Stone, and Slate.

== Main arguments ==
- The book argues that the concept of and movement towards meritocracy which initially stemmed from a desire to subvert and democratize the East Coast WASP aristocracy resulted in a widening of the pool eligible to become elites but ultimately reproduced widespread inequality and corruption. That corruption, continues the author, has led to a record increase in the distrust of American institutions both public and private and to the rise of a class of "insurrectionist" commentators and activists such as the Tea Party movement and Occupy Wall Street. The author also reviews various scandals which he believes heightened the distrust: Enron, the unveiling of rampant sexual abuse by Catholic priests, the misguided consensus among media and political elites that Iraq harbored weapons of mass destruction, among others.
- The author notes that the concept of "meritocracy" was long a rare uniting value held by both the Left and the Right in the United States and even Europe.
- Thanks to the meritocracy, test scores have become the key to one's entrance into the ranks of ruling and governing elites but the rise of the test tutoring industry has reproduced old patterns of inequality because, among other factors, few African-Americans are able to afford the fees of test prep courses. The result has been disproportionately low admission of African-Americans at schools such as the quintessentially meritocratic Hunter College High School where admission is based solely on test scores.
- The book analyzes the meaning of the word "elite" and analyzes its composition and values. The author argues that in today's society power is not just conveyed by wealth but also by platform and network.
- Hayes expounds the concept of "fractal inequality" defined as the insecurity which haunts elites (at all levels) of not belonging to the even more elite circles from which they are excluded. He credits the insecurity caused by fractal inequality, coupled with what he calls "the cult of smartness", for rampant institutional corruption.
- The book concludes with an exploration of the rise of leaderless organizations such as Occupy Wall Street.

== Publication data ==
- Hayes, C. (2012). Twilight of the Elites: America After Meritocracy (1st ed.). New York: Crown Publishing. ISBN 9780307720450. (hardcover)
