= Yasmin Vossoughian =

American journalist (born 1978)

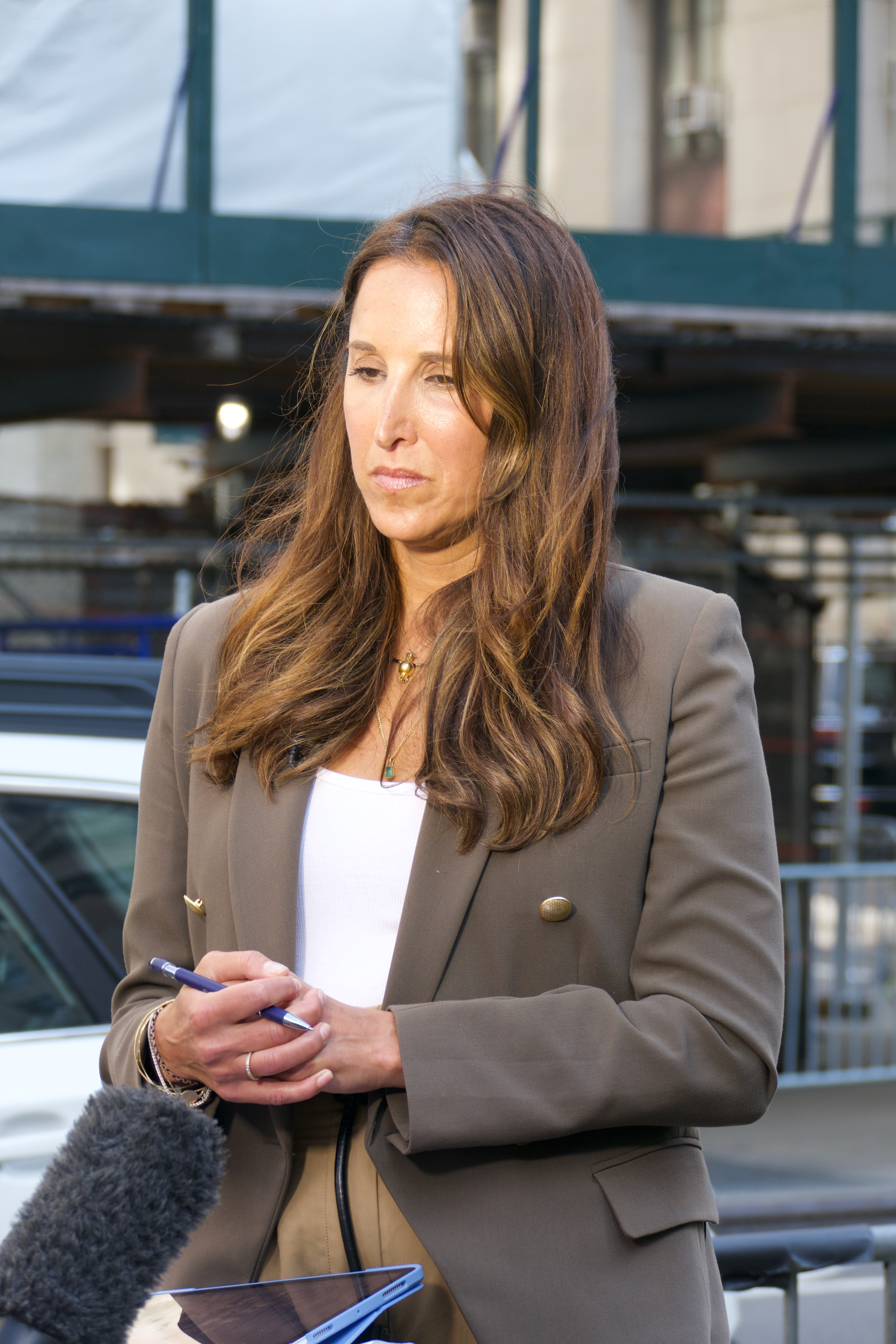
- Yasmin Vossoughian at the Manhattan Criminal Courthouse in 2024, reporting about the prosecution of Donald Trump in New York.
- Born: October 3, 1978 (age 47); New York City, New York, U.S.
- Occupation: Television journalist
- Height: 5 ft 10 in (1.78 m)
- Spouse: Whittaker Lindsay Clifford

Yasmin Vossoughian (born October 3, 1978) is an American television journalist currently serving as a national reporter for NBC News.

== Early life and education ==
Vossoughian was raised in Cornwall-on-Hudson, New York, the daughter of Dr. Ahad and Shamsi Vossoughian, immigrants from Iran. She was born with a large, purple birthmark covering much of her left leg, which she kept hidden under pants or tights throughout her career. Vossoughian graduated from Northfield Mount Hermon, a private college-preparatory school in Gill, Massachusetts after which she earned a B.A. from Occidental College in Los Angeles. Her family is Muslim.

== Career ==
Vossoughian began her career at CNN's sister channel HLN (formerly CNN Headline News), working as a correspondent. She then worked as an anchor of Morning Joe First Look, the now-cancelled pre-show for MSNBC’s flagship weekday morning show, Morning Joe after which she served as the host of MSNBC’s weekend rolling news program Yasmin Vossoughian Reports, airing from 2:00 p.m. to 4:00 p.m. ET on weekends, until it was canceled in November 2023.

Vossoughian's presence on MSNBC gradually decreased, along with the cable network's reliance on other NBC News talent, in the lead-up to its spinoff from NBCUniversal into Versant, a new publicly-traded company. Vossoughian remains with NBC News.

Prior to the spinoff, Vossoughian regularly filled in on weekday editions of MSNBC Reports for José Díaz-Balart, Andrea Mitchell, and Chris Jansing.

== Personal life ==
She is married and has two sons.
