= The Ed Show =

Television series

- Presented by: Ed Schultz
- Country of origin: United States
- Original language: English

Production
- Production locations: 30 Rockefeller Center; New York City, New York; Detroit Lakes, Minnesota
- Running time: 60 minutes

Original release
- Network: MSNBC
- Release: April 6, 2009 – July 31, 2015

The Ed Show was an hour-long weekday news commentary program on MSNBC that aired from 2009 to 2015. The program was hosted by Ed Schultz, who also hosted the nationally syndicated radio program The Ed Schultz Show from 2004 to 2014.

The show aired in a variety of timeslots. It debuted as a weeknight program on MSNBC on April 6, 2009, at 6 PM ET, It later moved to 10 PM ET, filling the time slot previously occupied by The Last Word with Lawrence O'Donnell when that show took over the 8 PM ET slot after Countdown with Keith Olbermann was cancelled. In October 2011, it swapped spots with The Last Word with Lawrence O'Donnell. On March 13, 2013, Schultz revealed that he would be moving to a new expanded weekend lineup at the network. His last weeknight show aired on March 14, and the show returned as a weekend show on May 11 at 5 PM ET.

The Ed Show returned to weeknights on August 26 of the same year, taking the 5 PM ET slot previously held by one airing of Hardball with Chris Matthews.

On July 30, 2015, MSNBC president Phil Griffin announced that the series had been cancelled in an effort to transition the network's daytime programming to more breaking news reporting and less political commentary and opinion. The program aired its final episode on July 31, 2015.

== Format ==
The show used a multi-camera, video and graphics driven format not seen on other MSNBC programs. The first block of the show was fast-paced during the Op-Ed segment. Schultz originally did most of his segments standing, but eventually moved to a sitting format. The graphics package that was used by The Ed Show differed from others at MSNBC, with orange and black graphics; other programs use blue and white.

On April 11, 2011, MSNBC incorporated a new logo, a new studio, a new color scheme, using more blue than orange, and a new segment at the beginning of The Ed Show which has Schultz standing while doing a monologue about a chosen subject in front of a screen that flashes graphics such as charts and archive footage.

== Segments ==
- Club Ed – brought liberal comedians (most commonly Lizz Winstead or Stephanie Miller) to provide commentary.
- Psycho Talk – Schultz played a clip of someone on television or radio saying something he deems reprehensible to the point of being nutty. He proceeded to analyze the statement and criticize it, concluding the segment with the words, "and that is Psycho Talk."
- takEDown – was similar to Psycho Talk.
- Rapid Response – featured panel debates
- Fired Up (also called Op-Ed) – Schultz provided a topical editorial.
- The BIG Finish - was a final story rounding out the episode.

== Ratings ==
In May 2009, according to Nielsen data, The Ed Show finished well behind CNN and Fox News Channel at 6 pm, averaging 500,000 total viewers and 160,000 in the 25-54 demographic numbers, which were down 13% and 35% respectively compared with May 2008 when David Gregory was anchoring the hour.

However, ratings for The Ed Show were higher in 2010 compared to 2009. Ratings were up 8% in the coveted age 25-54 demographic and up 2% overall

In 2011 and 2012, The Ed Show began finishing 2nd in its timeslot, beaten in total viewers only by Fox News.

In September 2014, The Ed Show finished behind both CNN and Fox News in both the 25-54 demographic and total viewers.

== Guest hosts ==
Regular guest hosts of the show included Cenk Uygur, David Shuster, Thomas Roberts and Michael Eric Dyson. Al Sharpton, Chris Hayes and Lawrence O'Donnell also guest-hosted; all three gained their own series on MSNBC after first guest-hosting on The Ed Show.

== Controversial statements ==
On May 23, 2011, on his radio talk show, Schultz called Laura Ingraham "a right-wing slut" and a "talk slut". He apologized to her on his television show the next day, announcing that he was suspending himself from television:

"What matters is, ... what I said was terribly vile, and not of the standards that I or any other person should adhere to. I want all of you to know tonight that I did call Laura Ingraham today and did not make contact with her, and I will apologize to her, as I did in the message that I left her today. I also met with management here at MSNBC, and understanding the severity of the situation and what I said on the radio, and how it reflected terribly on this company, I have offered to take myself off the air for an indefinite period of time with no pay. I want to apologize to Laura Ingraham, I want to apologize to my family; my wife; I have embarrassed my family; I have embarrassed this company; and I have been in this business since 1978 and I have made a lot of mistakes; this is the lowest of low for me."

The suspension lasted for one week.

On August 15, 2011, on his TV show, Schultz played a clip that purportedly showed Texas Governor Rick Perry making racist remarks at an Iowa Republican Party event. In his speech, Perry referred to the U.S. national debt as "that big black cloud that hangs over America". Schultz showed an edited clip containing only the quoted phrase, and followed it by stating, "That black cloud Perry is talking about is President Barack Obama." Schultz apologized on-air the next day.

Preceded by Now with Alex Wagner	MSNBC Weekday Lineup; 5:00 PM-6:00 PM	Succeeded by PoliticsNation with Al Sharpton
