= Deadline: White House =

American television program

- Genre: News program Talk show
- Presented by: Nicolle Wallace
- Country of origin: United States
- Original language: English

Production
- Executive producer: Patrick Burkey
- Production locations: Studio 3A, 30 Rockefeller Plaza
- Camera setup: Multi-camera
- Running time: 120 minutes

Original release
- Network: MSNBC
- Release: May 9, 2017 – November 7, 2025
- Network: MS NOW
- Release: November 10, 2025 – present

Related
- MS NOW Reports; The Beat with Ari Melber

Deadline: White House is an American news and politics television program airing weekdays from 4 to 6 p.m. ET on MS NOW. It is hosted by political analyst Nicolle Wallace.

== History ==
The show premiered on May 9, 2017. Deadline was created as a late afternoon political interview and discussion show, similar in style to the network's highly successful morning program, Morning Joe.

The program is also meant to take advantage of Wallace's deep political connections, the result of her years working for the George W. Bush Administration and the John McCain presidential campaign in 2008. With the launch of this broadcast, Wallace continued her role as fill-in host on MSNBC's The 11th Hour with Brian Williams.

On August 3, 2020, it was announced that Deadline: White House would expand into a two-hour program beginning on August 17, as part of MSNBC's new weekday afternoon lineup. The series' second hour effectively moved MTP Daily into an early afternoon slot.

Joe Biden in an interview with Nicolle Wallace in 2023

On November 21, 2023, Wallace announced that she would go on hiatus from the program to care for her new surrogate daughter, with the show being anchored by guest hosts in the meantime. Wallace returned on February 26, 2024.

== Format ==
The show primarily focuses on discussing, analyzing, and reporting on the day's latest news in politics. Panel discussions, one-on-one interviews, and brief monologues regularly compose much of the program.

The first hour of Deadline: White House focuses on the breaking political news and top stories of the day, while its second hour tends to center around less-significant political stories not covered in the first hour, barring no major breaking news stories warranting continued coverage. Before the top of MSNBC's 6 p.m. ET hour, a brief hand-off to The Beat with Ari Melber concludes the Deadline: White House broadcast.

Guest hosts for Deadline: White House includes John Heilemann, Alicia Menendez, Ayman Mohyeldin, Symone Sanders-Townsend, and Ali Velshi.

== Spinoffs ==
=== Deadline: Legal Blog ===
Deadline: Legal Blog, published on msnbc.com, is the digital blog extension of Deadline: White House. Blogs published under the Deadline: Legal Blog title on msnbc.com are solely written by MSNBC legal analyst Jordan Rubin, and are not written by Nicolle Wallace, who anchors Deadline: White House. Deadline: Legal Blog debuted on January 24, 2023.

Daily pieces written for the blog focus exclusively on analyzing the day's latest legal news.

=== Deadline: Legal Newsletter ===
Deadline: Legal newsletter is an extension of both Deadline: White House and Deadline: Legal Blog, providing email subscribers with Deadline’s analysis and reporting on the latest legal and political news in the form of an email newsletter.

Preceded by The Moment with Katy Tur	MS NOW Weekday Lineup; 4:00 pm – 6:00 pm	Succeeded by The Beat with Ari Melber
