= Up (TV program) =

2011 American TV program

- Also known as: Up with David Gura
- Genre: Political news/opinion program
- Presented by: Chris Hayes (2011–2013); Steve Kornacki (2013–2015); David Gura (2018–2020)
- Country of origin: United States
- Original language: English

Production
- Production location: New York City
- Camera setup: Multi-camera
- Running time: 120 minutes

Original release
- Network: MSNBC
- Release: September 17, 2011 – January 2016
- Release: October 2018 – February 2020

Up, branded in its final incarnation as Up with David Gura, is a news and opinion television program that aired weekends on MSNBC. The program debuted September 17, 2011, as Up with Chris Hayes, and was hosted by Hayes until March 2013 when he left to host All In with Chris Hayes, a new MSNBC weekday primetime program. Steve Kornacki's first episode aired April 13, 2013; he left in October 2015 for MSNBC dayside. The program ended in January 2016 for MSNBC's special political coverage. MSNBC Live aired in its place with Alex Witt and Frances Rivera from 2016 to 2018. The program was revived in 2018, hosted by David Gura until it was replaced in 2020 by a new program hosted by Ali Velshi.

== Background ==
Before working at MSNBC, Hayes was Washington, D.C., editor of The Nation. On August 1, 2011, MSNBC announced that Hayes would host a two-hour morning program on Saturdays and Sundays on the network. The first airing of Up with Chris Hayes was September 17, 2011, and featured a live interview with current-Speaker Nancy Pelosi. The premiere of the Sunday program featured an appearance by MSNBC host Rachel Maddow. In addition to hosting "Up," Hayes would also continue to serve as a contributor to other MSNBC programs as well as continuing his work at The Nation as editor-at-large based in NYC.

Up was, at the time of its premiere, the most recent of MSNBC's attempts to place political opinion or talk shows on weekends; two other programs, Jesse Ventura's America (aired in 2003) and Weekends with Maury and Connie (aired in 2006), experienced short, months-long runs on weekend slots. According to Cenk Uygur, a former host on MSNBC, he was offered a weekend slot in return for letting go of his early-2011 slot on weekday evening airings of MSNBC Live, but turned it down and left the channel due to managerial disputes (commentator Al Sharpton was eventually appointed to Uygur's former slot, renamed PoliticsNation with Al Sharpton in August 2011; Uygur, instead, became a contributor and later host of The Young Turks on Current TV).

It was announced that January 5, 2012, that fellow The Nation and MSNBC contributor Melissa Harris-Perry would host her own weekend program, beginning February 4, 2012, at 10:00 am, following Up and leading to Weekends with Alex Witt.

Hayes gave up weekends and hosted the 8 p.m. ET hour on MSNBC weekdays, with his first nightly show taking place on April 1. On March 19, Steve Kornacki was named as the new host. His first episode aired April 13, 2013. Kornacki indicated that the program would maintain continuity, saying "a lot of progressive ideas were expressed through Up [with Chris Hayes], but I think the common thread through all the ideas, whether they’re progressive or whether they’re coming from the right, is that... they’re ideas that are worthy of discussion and worthy of exploration."

In April 2013, Anne Thompson left her role as the Democratic National Committee's director of video production to become a segment producer for the program.

In October 2018, Up returned to MSNBC's weekend programming, with David Gura as host.

In January 2020, MSNBC announced a new lineup with a program hosted by former Velshi & Ruhle anchor Ali Velshi replacing Up's timeslot.

== Format ==
From the beginning, Up has had a more panel-driven, opinion format than most traditional morning news programs and is more comparable to MSNBC weekday prime-time programming. To prepare new guests for the program, Hayes advises them, "The first and foremost important rule of the show: we're not on television – no talking points, no sound bites... We have a lot of time for actual conversation. So actually listen, actually respond." The program is "slightly wonky, fairly serious, but without taking itself more seriously than the stories it covers". A typical show consists of a 4-person panel discussion of relevant topics as well as several segments detailing specific stories or interviews with newsmakers. Hayes has stated that, in general, the Saturday program will analyze the stories of the previous week, while the Sunday program will serve as a look ahead at the week to come. Hayes notes that "Cable news is very white, male and straight", and aims for a younger more ideologically idiosyncratic set of guests who are reflective of the diversity of the country.

Much of this same ideology continued into the David Gura era, with the format being almost unchanged.

The official Twitter hashtag of the program is #uppers which began as a joke about the early show time that went viral.

Up was broadcast from 30 Rockefeller Plaza in New York City.
