= Stephanie Ruhle =

American journalist (born 1975)

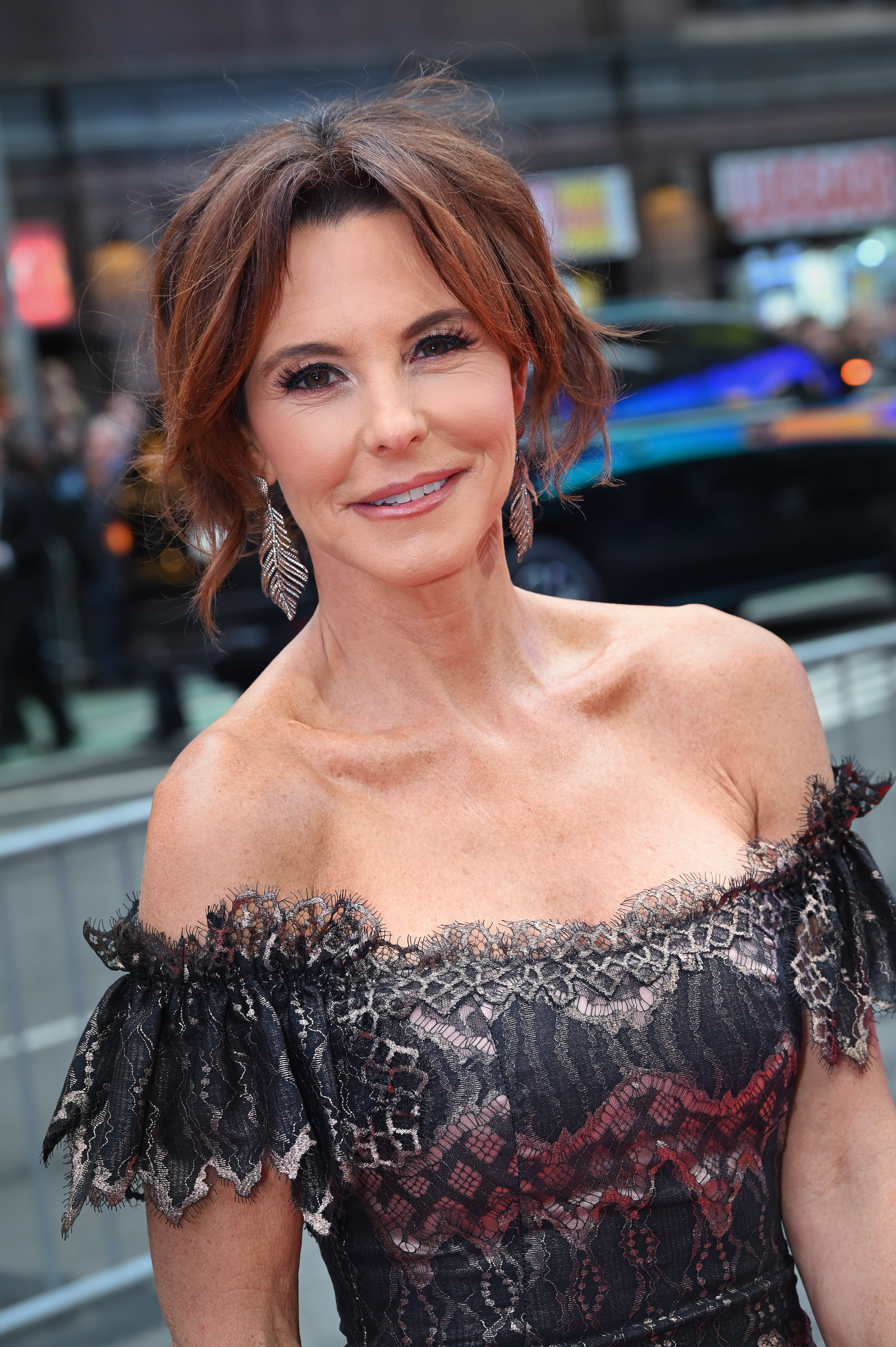
- Ruhle in 2025
- Born: Stephanie Leigh Ruhle; December 24, 1975 (age 50); Park Ridge, New Jersey, U.S.
- Education: Lehigh University (BA)
- Occupations: Television host, news anchor
- Employer: Versant
- Television: Money, Power, Politics with Stephanie Ruhle
- Spouse: Andy Hubbard (m. 2002)
- Children: 3
- Website: www.stephanieruhle.com

Stephanie Ruhle Hubbard (born Stephanie Leigh Ruhle; December 24, 1975) is an American journalist who is the senior business correspondent for NBC News and also the host of MS NOW's Money, Power, Politics with Stephanie Ruhle.

Ruhle earned a degree in international business in 1997, and started her career in financial services, working for Credit Suisse and subsequently Deutsche Bank. She began hosting programs on Bloomberg Television in 2011.

Ruhle was managing editor and news anchor for Bloomberg Television and editor-at-large for Bloomberg News, and later the anchor of Stephanie Ruhle Reports. She co-hosted the Bloomberg Television show Bloomberg GO and was one of three Bloomberg reporters who broke the story identifying the trader behind the 2012 JPMorgan Chase trading loss.

== Early life ==
Ruhle's parents are Frank and Louise Ruhle. She was raised in Park Ridge, New Jersey, and attended Park Ridge High School. She graduated from Lehigh University with a bachelor's degree in international business in 1997. As part of her major, she studied in Guatemala, Italy, and Kenya. She returned to Lehigh to give the 2017 commencement address.

== Career ==
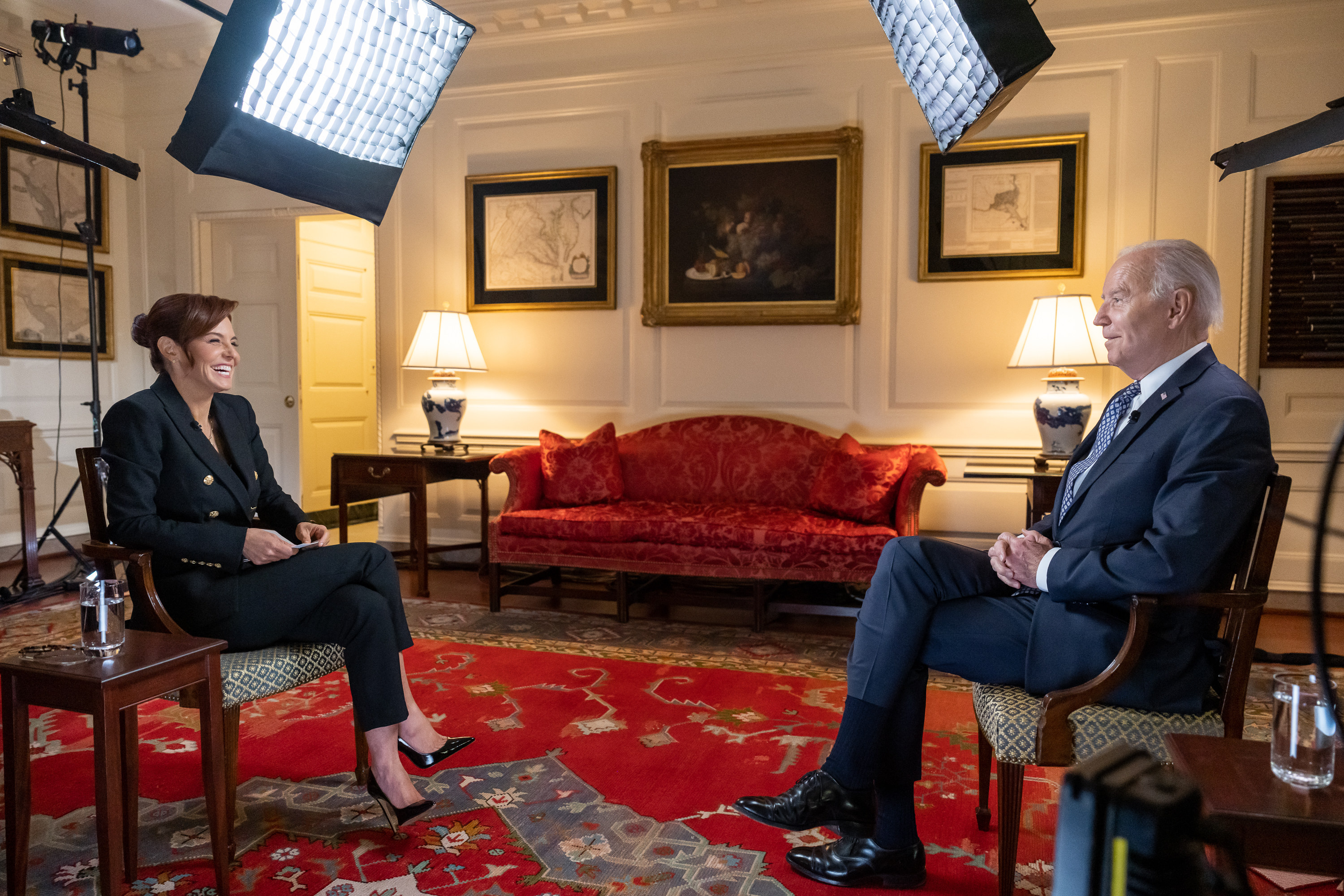
Ruhle interviews President Joe Biden in May 2023

Before joining Bloomberg, Ruhle spent 14 years in finance. While in college, she spent a summer interning for Merrill Lynch. In 1997 she joined Credit Suisse, where she spent six years working in hedge fund sales. During her time at Credit Suisse First Boston, she served as a vice president and became the highest producing credit derivatives salesperson in the United States. In 2003, Ruhle joined Deutsche Bank as a credit salesperson covering hedge funds; She ended her eight-year career there as a managing director in Global Markets Senior Relationship Management, which involved working with the bank's larger hedge fund clients. While at Deutsche Bank, Ruhle founded the Global Market Women's Network to help women move into leadership roles at the company.

Ruhle joined Bloomberg Television in October 2011, where she co-hosted a two-hour early morning program called Inside Track with co-anchor Erik Schatzker. In 2012, Ruhle and Schatzker joined Market Makers, a two-hour late morning program. Ruhle then co-hosted Bloomberg GO with David Westin before leaving the network. She has profiled figures including former New York City Mayor Michael Bloomberg, Goldman Sachs CEO Lloyd Blankfein, hedge fund managers Stanley Druckenmiller and David Tepper, NBA players Kobe Bryant and Dwyane Wade, Donald Trump, JPMorgan Chase chairman and CEO Jamie Dimon, Martha Stewart, Sean Parker, former Vice President Al Gore, business magnate Russell Simmons, Masters winner Jordan Spieth, Macy's CEO and chair Terry Lundgren, and music moguls Sean Combs and Kanye West.

In April 2012, Ruhle, along with Bloomberg reporters Bradley Keoun and Mary Childs, were the first reporters to break the story of the London Whale, the trader behind the 2012 JPMorgan Chase trading loss. Ruhle reported that Bruno Iksil, the London-based trader at JPMorgan Chase, had amassed positions large enough to distort prices in the $10 trillion credit derivative market.

In June 2013, Ruhle wrote a provocative response to Paul Tudor Jones' comments on women in trading for the Huffington Post that elicited responses from both the media and financial industries. In October of that same year, Ruhle sat down with Martha Stewart to discuss social media, blogging, and the creation of the "lifestyle" category. This interview brought an ongoing feud between Stewart and Gwyneth Paltrow into public view, after Stewart questioned the actress's place in the "lifestyle business".

In 2015, Ruhle produced and hosted Haiti: Open For Business? (2015), a documentary that explores Haiti's emerging market five years after a devastating earthquake hit the country. Ruhle also appeared in Shark Land: A Mission Blue and Fusion Expedition (2015), which brings attention to the plight of sharks in Cocos Island, a national park off the shore of Costa Rica. Also in 2015, she interviewed then-presidential candidate Donald Trump, who faced backlash in the media after noting to Ruhle that "the World Trade Center came down during [former President George W. Bush's] reign."

While at Bloomberg, Ruhle became a columnist for Shape.com, the website for Shape magazine. She was featured on the cover of Working Mother magazine in October 2012, as well as Fit Pregnancy on their April/May 2013 issue. She has been profiled by 201 Magazine, Glass Hammer, IWantHerJob, and Business Insider.

After leaving Bloomberg in April 2016, Ruhle became host of an hour of MSNBC Reports on weekdays, after which she co-hosted the business program Velshi & Ruhle with Ali Velshi, airing on Saturdays.

Ruhle founded the Corporate Investment Bank (CIB) Women's Network and co-chaired the Women on Wall Street (WOWS) steering committee. Ruhle is also a member of the board of trustees for Girls, Inc. New York and a former member of the iMentor Corporate Advisory Board. She is a member of 100 Women in Hedge Funds, the Women's Bond Club and a member of the corporate council of the White House Project, a not-for-profit organization working to advance women in business, government, and media. She also serves on the board and advises for React to Film, an issue-based documentary film series.

On January 27, 2022, she was named a new permanent anchor of The 11th Hour, after serving as one of several rotating hosts following original anchor Brian Williams's departure from the network in December.

Lawyers questioned Ruhle in early 2023 regarding a lawsuit by shareholders of sportswear company Under Armour. According to The Wall Street Journal, court documents showed that company founder Kevin Plank gave Ruhle a phone with a special email address to communicate with him privately and, at all hours, sent her confidential financial information about the company and enlisted her help to refute concerns about slumping sales. During his deposition, according to the Journal, Plank described Ruhle's role by saying: "She's a confidant. I would give her counsel on her career and she would give me counsel on things I was dealing with that were either banking or media or human nature in relation." In her deposition, the paper reported, Ruhle said she took free trips with Plank on his private plane. When asked if she acted as a friend or journalist on those trips, she said in her deposition, "I was flying on his plane as myself, Stephanie Ruhle. I'm not really in a category one or the other." The same reporter, Khadeeja Safdar, had previously reported on the relationship between the billionaire and Ruhle in February 2019.

In March 2026, MS NOW announced that Ruhle would move back to daytime, hosting a new 9 a.m. program beginning in June 2026. It was later announced the program would be titled Money, Power, Politics with Stephanie Ruhle and it debuted on June 15.

== Personal life ==
Ruhle is married to Andy Hubbard, whom she met in 1998 when both were working at Credit Suisse. They lived in Manhattan as of 2019 and have three children. She is Catholic.

== See also ==
- New Yorkers in journalism
