= Chris Hayes =

American political journalist and author (born 1979)

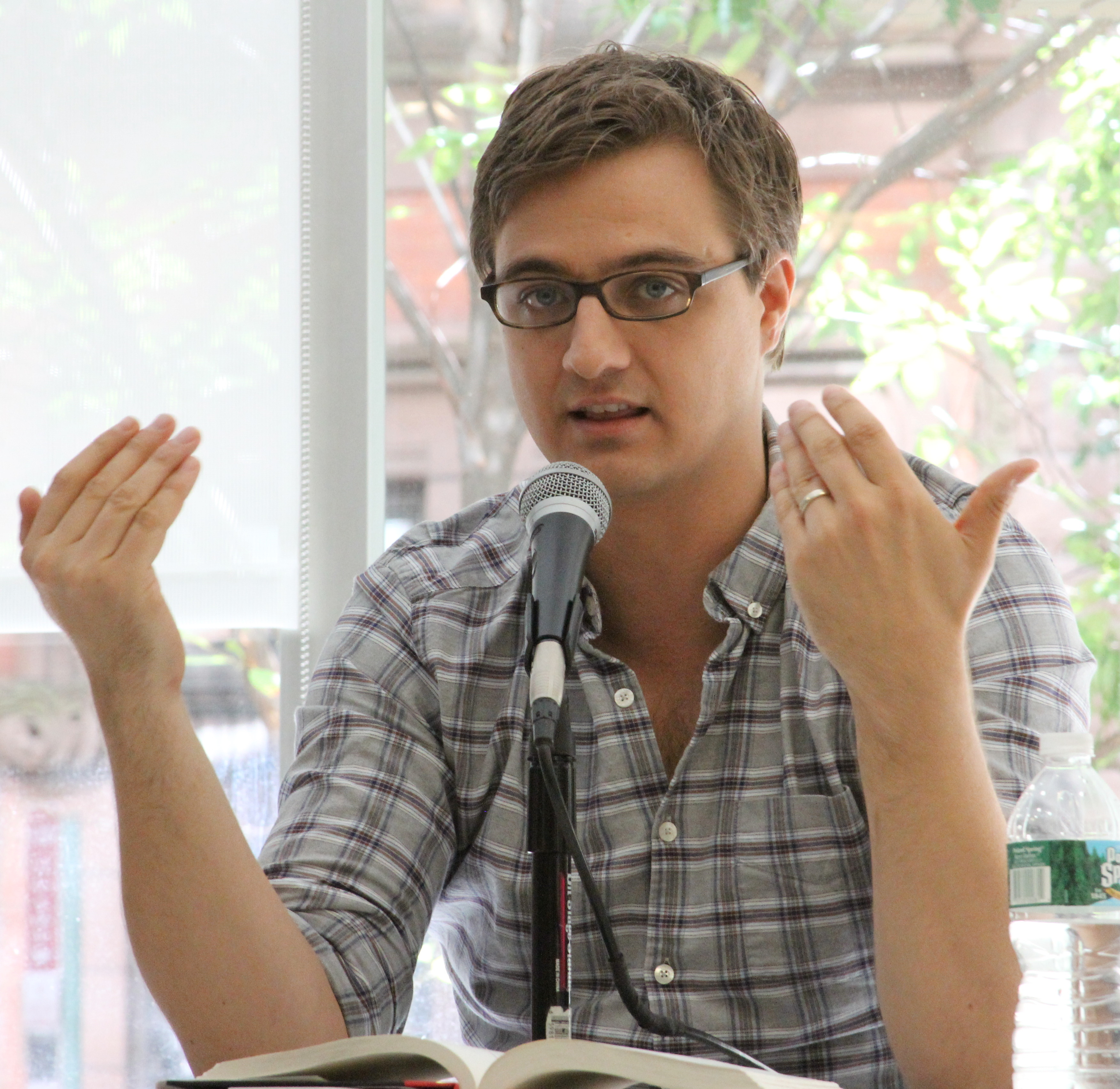
- Hayes on the 2012 Brooklyn Book Festival panel
- Born: Christopher Loffredo Hayes; February 28, 1979 (age 47); New York City, U.S.
- Education: Brown University (BA)
- Occupations: Political commentator; news anchor; author; editor
- Years active: 2001–present
- Employer: NBCUniversal
- Television: Up with Chris Hayes (2011–2013); All In with Chris Hayes (2013–present)
- Political party: Democratic
- Spouse: Kate A. Shaw (m. 2007)
- Children: 3
- Website: ChrisHayes.org

Christopher Loffredo Hayes (/heɪz/; born February 28, 1979) is an American political commentator, television news anchor, and author. Hayes hosts All In with Chris Hayes, a weekday news and opinion television show on MS NOW. Hayes also hosts a weekly MS NOW podcast, Why Is This Happening? Hayes formerly hosted a weekend MSNBC show, Up with Chris Hayes. He is an editor-at-large of The Nation magazine.

== Early life and education ==
Hayes was born in the Bronx, New York City, one of two sons of Roger and Geri Hayes. His mother is of Italian descent and his father is of Irish Catholic ancestry. His father moved to New York from Chicago while studying at a Jesuit seminary and began community organizing in the Bronx. Roger Hayes spent several years leading community organizing at the Community Service Society of New York and works as an assistant commissioner for the NYC Department of Health. Hayes's mother was a school teacher and works for the NYC Department of Education. Hayes was raised Catholic, but stopped attending services in college and does not consider himself to be religious. He is a childhood friend and schoolmate of comedian Desus Nice.

Hayes attended Hunter College High School in New York City; his classmates included Immortal Technique and Lin-Manuel Miranda. Hayes directed the latter in Miranda's first musical. He attended Brown University, majoring in philosophy and graduating with a Bachelor of Arts in 2001. Speaking of "intellectual formation" at Brown with Ezra Klein, Hayes stated: "I was a philosophy major, but I was very much in this sort of analytic school. But the intellectual culture of the place I was with and the people I was with was very influenced by postmodern critique, by Foucault... particularly." At Brown, Hayes met his future wife, Kate A. Shaw.

== Journalism career ==
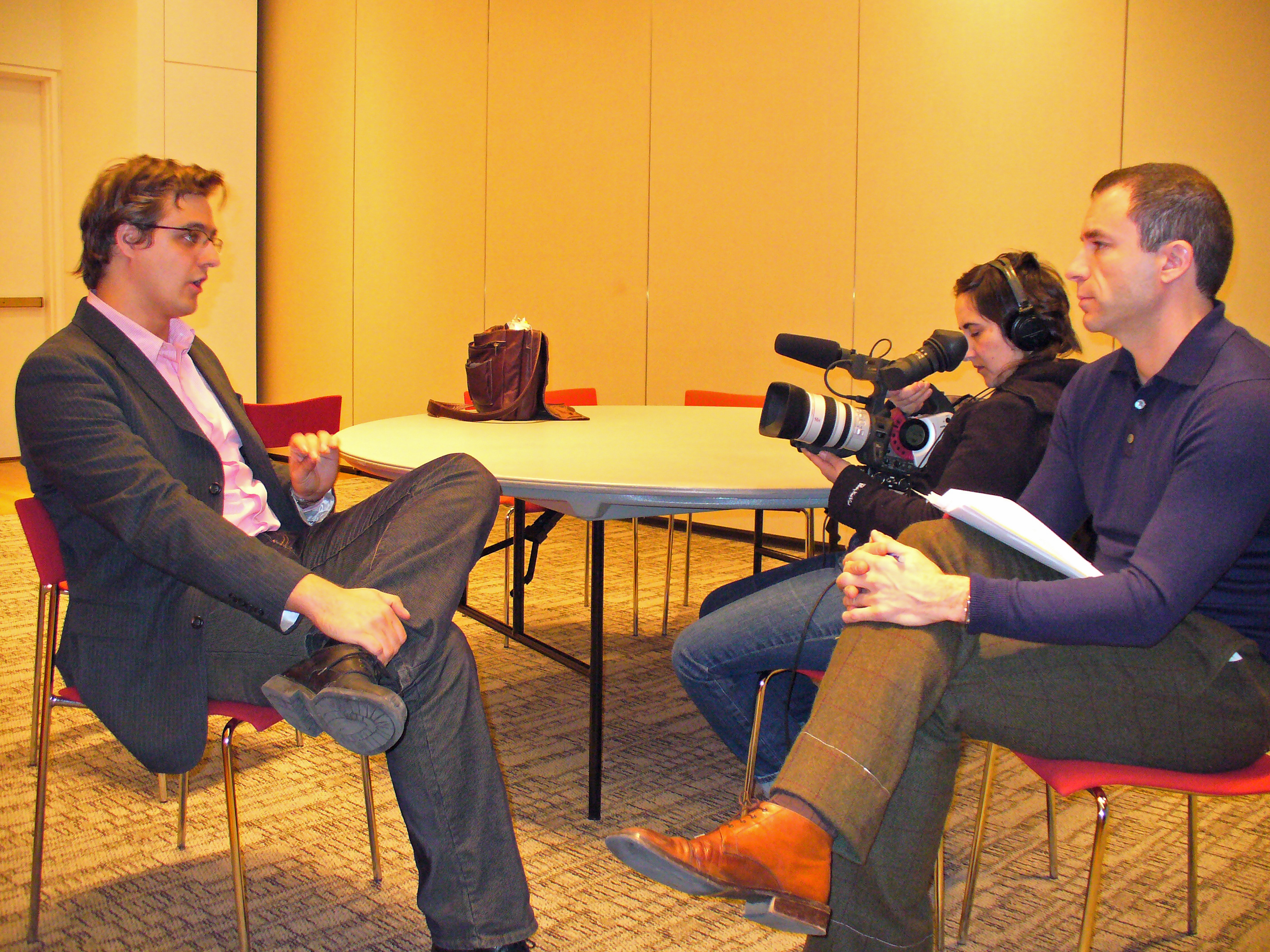
Chris Hayes interviewed by Alan Miller

=== Print ===
Beginning in August 2001, and for four years, Hayes was a contributor to independent weekly newspaper Chicago Reader, for which he covered local and national politics. In late 2003, he began a four-year stint at In These Times, a labor-focused monthly magazine based in Chicago where he was a senior editor. From 2005 to 2006, Hayes was a Schumann Center Writing Fellow at In These Times. From 2006 through 2007, Hayes was a Puffin Foundation Writing Fellow at The Nation Institute and a contributing writer for The Nation. On November 1, 2007, The Nation named him its Washington, D.C., editor, succeeding David Corn.

Hayes wrote extensively on issues central to the liberal community, including what ails the Democratic Party in the post-9/11 era and how the labor movement is changing. He also reported on progressive activists' work to resuscitate the "public option" during the 2009–10 health-care fight, when many political insiders wrote it off as dead. Hayes was an adjunct professor of English at St. Augustine College in Chicago and a Bernard L. Schwartz fellow at New America Foundation from 2008 to 2010.

=== Cable news ===
Hayes guest-hosted The Rachel Maddow Show in July 2010 while Maddow was traveling in Afghanistan, and he later often filled in for Maddow when she was absent due to his twinlike resemblance to Maddow. Hayes has also hosted other MSNBC shows such as The Ed Show, Countdown with Keith Olbermann, and The Last Word with Lawrence O'Donnell.

On November 5, 2010, MSNBC announced that Hayes would be filling in for Keith Olbermann during Olbermann's suspension. However, the network later backtracked after finding out that Hayes, too, had made political contributions—the issue over which Olbermann was suspended. Hayes is also the most frequent guest on Late Night with Seth Meyers.

==== Up with Chris Hayes ====
On August 1, 2011, MSNBC announced that Hayes would host a two-hour morning show on Saturdays and Sundays, each going into depth on current issues. The first airing of Up with Chris Hayes was on September 17, 2011, and featured a live interview with Nancy Pelosi.

On May 27, 2012, Memorial Day weekend, Hayes made comments on air regarding the use of the word "heroism" as applied to American servicemen killed in action, stating, "I feel uncomfortable about the word because it seems to me that it is so rhetorically proximate to justifications for more war. And I don't want to obviously desecrate or disrespect the memory of anyone that's fallen, and obviously there are individual circumstances in which there is genuine, tremendous heroism, you know, hail of gunfire, rescuing fellow soldiers, and things like that. But it seems to me that we marshal this word in a way that is problematic. But maybe I'm wrong about that." His remark generated widespread controversy. Hayes initially defended his comment by urging people to listen to what he had actually said. Nonetheless, he apologized on his blog. Furthermore, on his June 2, 2012, show, he devoted a discussion to his comments and the disconnect between civilians and the military.

==== All In with Chris Hayes ====
On March 14, 2013, MSNBC announced that Hayes would take over the time slot formerly hosted by Ed Schultz, who would move to the weekends. At 34 years old, Hayes became the youngest host of a prime-time show on any of the major U.S. cable news channels. All In with Chris Hayes, Hayes's first prime-time show, premiered on Monday, April 1, 2013. The show won an Emmy in 2015 and again in 2018.

=== Podcasts ===
In May 2018, Hayes launched a weekly podcast called Why Is This Happening?, featuring interviews with political figures, activists, journalists, writers, and academicians. The podcast's first live episode was recorded in November 2018, at Congregation Beth Elohim, in Brooklyn, New York, with author Ta-Nehisi Coates. Hayes's second live episode, held on February 24, 2019, featured an interview with Georgia politician and activist Stacey Abrams.

=== Scripted television ===
On April 8, 2026, Hayes made a cameo as himself in the fifth season premiere of Amazon Prime Video's political superhero television show The Boys.

== Views ==
In a 2022 interview, Hayes identified himself as "a social democrat, a Rawlsian liberal," and advocated for a mixed economy that mixes elements of capitalism and socialism. Hayes has described his philosophy as "freedom plus groceries".

=== Press freedom ===
Hayes criticized the U.S. government's decision to charge WikiLeaks founder Julian Assange under the Espionage Act of 1917 for his role in the 2010 publication of a trove of Iraq War documents and diplomatic cables leaked by army intelligence analyst Chelsea Manning. Hayes tweeted, "The Espionage indictment of Assange for publishing is an extremely dangerous, frontal attack on the free press. Bad, bad, bad."

== Books ==
Hayes' first book, Twilight of the Elites: America After Meritocracy, was published by Crown Publishing Group in June 2012. A review in The Atlantic called it "provocative" and "thoughtful" but faulted its policy suggestions as less satisfying. In a starred review, Kirkus Reviews called it "forcefully written" and "provocative." Aaron Swartz described the book as "compellingly readable, impossibly erudite, and—most stunningly of all—correct."

Hayes's second book, A Colony in a Nation, about the U.S. criminal justice system, was published by W. W. Norton in March 2017. Hayes's third book, The Sirens' Call: How Attention Became the World's Most Endangered Resource, was published on January 28, 2025, by Penguin Random House. The book cites social science studies to explain how attention works and how society ended up in what he calls the "attention age," part of the information age. In particular, Hayes writes about the impact of both the monetization of human attention and the ongoing competition for this limited resource. The book was included on former president Barack Obama's 2025 summer reading list.

=== Book festivals ===
Hayes participated in the 2017 Brooklyn Book Festival. In April 2017, he was a featured author at the L.A. Times Festival of Books, which took place on the campus of the University of Southern California.

== Personal life ==
Hayes is married to Kate Shaw, a professor of law at the University of Pennsylvania Law School and a Supreme Court contributor for ABC News. Shaw had previously clerked for U.S. Supreme Court Justice John Paul Stevens. Shaw and Hayes met while attending Brown together. Her father is veteran Chicago reporter Andy Shaw.

Hayes and Shaw resided in Washington, D.C., until they moved to New York, where All In with Chris Hayes is produced. They have three children. Hayes's brother Luke worked on Barack Obama's 2008 and 2012 presidential campaigns and served as campaign manager for U.S. Congressman Jamaal Bowman in 2020. As of 2019, Hayes is a member of the Democratic Party.

== See also ==
- New Yorkers in journalism
