= The Beat with Ari Melber =

News and politics show on MS NOW

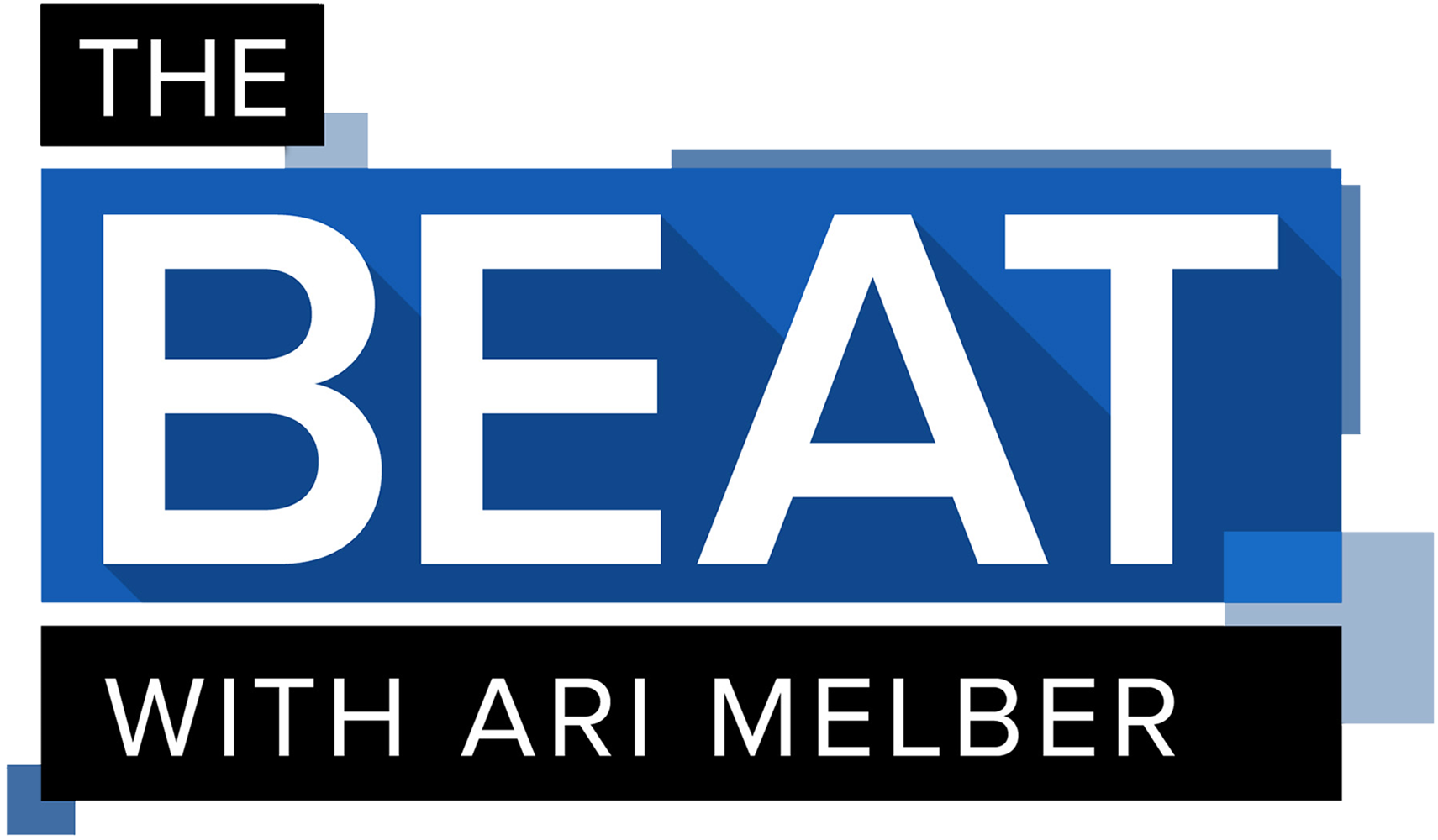
- Genre: U.S. news/politics
- Directed by: Rob Katko, Ken Neben
- Presented by: Ari Melber
- Country of origin: United States

Production
- Executive producer: Dann McDorman
- Running time: 60 minutes

Original release
- Network: MSNBC
- Release: July 24, 2017 – November 14, 2025
- Network: MS NOW
- Release: November 17, 2025 – present

The Beat with Ari Melber is an American news and politics program hosted by Ari Melber, who is the chief legal correspondent for the network MS NOW (formerly MSNBC).

The show airs weekdays at 6 p.m. ET and, as of May 2025, is the second-most-watched cable news program in its time slot by total viewers, and topped CNN in total and demo viewers for October 2026. Status reported The Beat surpassed 2 billion YouTube views in 2026, "a rare feat for a linear show."

== Format ==
The show features news reporting, one-on-one interviews, panels, and special reports by the anchor. The show includes a "Fallback Friday" segment; two series with extended interviews, "Mavericks," and "The Summit Series," and "Open Mind."

The program's guest hosts include Jason Johnson, Katie Phang, Ayman Mohyeldin, and Melissa Murray.

== History ==
The Beat with Ari Melber was announced after Greta Van Susteren's program For the Record with Greta ended. The network tapped Melber as one of its "most valuable utility players" for anchoring the 6 p.m. slot, according to the Associated Press, an effort to shore up an hour when MSNBC has historically drawn fewer viewers, trailing cable stars Bret Baier and Wolf Blitzer, who host the 6 p.m. shows on Fox News and CNN, respectively. Upon its debut, it was part of MSNBC's evening ratings surge among key demographics on cable television, and went on to draw a larger nightly audience than any hour of CNN.

The Beat with Ari Melber has been noted for its reporting on Facebook's role in elections and journalism. Mediaite wrote about its coverage of Facebook's role in the 2016 Philippines election, noting "host Ari Melber has carved out an important niche as arguably the leading critic of Facebook CEO Mark Zuckerberg in all of television."

Notable interviews Melber has conducted include U.S. Senator and later Vice President Kamala Harris, fellow senators Elizabeth Warren, Jeff Merkley, Richard Blumenthal, Dick Durbin, Mark Warner, and Cory Booker; Sheriff Joe Arpaio, who had a newsworthy legal exchange on the show, former White House adviser Stephen Bannon, former Trump aide Sam Nunberg, who later credited the interview for his decision to cooperate with Special Counsel Robert Mueller, also Donald Trump's former lawyer Michael Cohen has appeared on the show multiple times and musician Talib Kweli, who joined a discussion with Fat Joe and conservative Bill Kristol that Fortune called "one of the most delightfully diverse panels ever. Really."

The show also features musical and cultural guests, such as 50 Cent, Method Man, Vic Mensa, French Montana, Black Panther actor Winston Duke, Sean Penn, novelist Alice Walker, Andrew Leon Talley, DJs Stretch Armstrong, Bobbito Garcia and Jay Smooth, Desus and The Kid Mero (who both co-host Desus & Mero), and the rapper Havoc, (who noted Melber quoted his lyrics to explain a legal concept and announced a forthcoming Mobb Deep album in an interview on the show).

In 2020, The Beat was nominated for "Outstanding Live Interview" at the 41st News and Documentary Emmy Awards, and nominated in the same category for a 2024 "interview with Trump aide Stephen Miller" at the 46th News and Documentary Emmy Awards.

In 2024, as part of changes to its weekend schedule, MSNBC introduced The Beat Weekend—a week-in-review broadcast that airs on Saturday afternoons. Segments from the program are also featured on MSNBC Prime Weekend—a sister program airing on Sundays that draws from MSNBC's weekday programs.

== Reception ==
The Detroit Free Press named The Beat with Ari Melber to its "best" TV shows of 2017, noting its reporting "helped untangle the implications of Robert Mueller's Russia investigation, revealing the actual law obscured by the partisan posturing of so many cable news formats."

In 2023, The Beat's ratings "outranked everything else on MSNBC," the New York Times reported.

TVNewser reported that in 2017, The Beat with Ari Melber "defeated CNN in total viewers this year, and delivered the network's largest yearly audience ever" for its 6 p.m. timeslot. Forbes reported in 2017, the show delivered "MSNBC's best rating ever for the time slot," noting "MSNBC saw total day growth of 38%" in ratings, while "Melber's 6 p.m. slot saw growth of 56%."

TVNewser noted in February 2018, The Beat and Deadline: White House "posted record viewership in MSNBC history for their timeslots," and The Beat continued its ratings growth in 2018, averaging 1.7 million viewers per night in September 2018—more viewers than CNN's 6 p.m. show and more viewers than every other CNN show in prime time.

In 2023, The Associated Press reported "The Beat is often the most-watched [show] on MSNBC.", adding that Melber "brings a methodical, 'follow the facts' style to the issues he addresses."

The New York Times reported The Beat's ratings "outranked everything else on MSNBC" in 2023. The Beat was "the highest-rated non-Fox News show in the [ratings] demo" on cable news, according to AdWeek in November 2023.

The Beat is one of the most viewed shows online, per Daily Beast -- drawing over a billion total streams, a "notable feat for a cable news program" (CNN's Reliable Sources).

The show's "reach goes well beyond the dwindling number of people who watch cable television," wrote the Los Angeles Times in 2023, reporting on The Beat's YouTube ratings. "The Beat" can average 700,000 YouTube views per day,

Preceded by Deadline: White House	MS NOW Weekday Lineup; 6:00 pm – 7:00 pm	Succeeded by The Weeknight
