= MS NOW =

American cable television news channel

- Country: United States
- Broadcast area: United States, Canada and International
- Headquarters: 229 West 43rd Street, New York City

Programming
- Language: English
- Picture format: 1080i HDTV; (downscaled to letterboxed 480i for the SDTV feed)

Ownership
- Owner: Versant
- Parent: MS NOW Cable, LLC
- Sister channels: CNBC; CNBC World; E!; Golf Channel; Oxygen; Syfy; USA Network

History
- Launched: July 15, 1996; 30 years ago (as MSNBC); November 15, 2025; 11 months ago (as MS NOW)
- Replaced: America's Talking; (1994–1996); MSNBC Canada; (2001–2004, in Canada)
- Former names: MSNBC (1996–2025)

Links
- Website: www.ms.now

Availability

Streaming media
- Service(s): DirecTV Stream, Hulu + Live TV, Sling TV, YouTube TV
- DirecTV: 356

MS NOW (formerly MSNBC) is an American cable news channel owned by Versant. The channel primarily broadcasts rolling news coverage and opinion journalism. Its studios are in Versant's world headquarters at 229 West 43rd Street, New York City. It also maintains a bureau in Washington, D.C., co-located with that of former parent division NBC News, while technical operations are handled from CNBC's studios in Englewood Cliffs, New Jersey.

Among cable news channels, the company is ranked second in ratings, well behind Fox News, but ahead of CNN. As of July 2026, The Rachel Maddow Show on MS NOW was the 7th ranked news program by number of viewers; the top 6 were all on Fox News.

The channel was established in 1996 as MSNBC, a joint venture between NBC News and Microsoft (with its name being a portmanteau of "MSN" and "NBC") that encompassed the cable channel and the web portal MSNBC.com. Microsoft divested its stake in the television channel in 2005, followed by the website in 2012; the website was subsequently rebranded as NBCNews.com, and MSNBC.com was later relaunched to focus on editorial content from the network's personalities and programming.

It initially focused on rolling news coverage, including long-form reports, interactive programs, and stories contributed by the local news departments of NBC's affiliates. By the late 2000s, the network shifted to primarily opinion journalism featuring liberal commentators such as Keith Olbermann, Chris Matthews, David Gregory, Ed Schultz, and Rachel Maddow; in 2010, MSNBC surpassed CNN in primetime and overall viewership for the first time since 2001. In the mid-2010s, amid a decline in viewership, MSNBC concentrated on hard news coverage, and added programs incorporating NBC News personalities.

Under new leadership in the 2020s, MSNBC began reducing its reliance on NBC News personalities, and expanded its own newsgathering resources. In November 2025, ahead of the corporate spin-off of Versant by Comcast, MSNBC separated itself from NBCUniversal Media Group and rebranded as "MS NOW" (a backronym of "My Source [for] News, Opinion, [and the] World") to remove the overt use of NBC trademarks.

Programming is simulcast on SiriusXM and via TuneIn. Content is also provided via a YouTube channel and a streaming service with live streaming of the channel.

== History ==
Evolution of Comcast
- 1909: Independent Moving Pictures was founded by Carl Laemmle as the predecessor to Universal
- 1912: Universal Studios Hollywood was founded after Independent Moving merged with several smaller film studios
- 1915: Universal City, California, was established as the entertainment district for the Universal Studios Lot.
- 1924: MCA Inc. was founded by Jules Stein as a talent agency to book musicians
- 1926: RCA Corporation launched the NBC Radio Network, and by 1939, NBC began broadcasting on television.
- 1934: Decca Records America was established and would later grow to become Universal Music Group
- 1946: William Goetz and Leo Spitz began managing Universal Pictures, after merging International Pictures
- 1952: Decca Records America acquired a controlling stake in Universal Pictures
- 1958: MCA acquired the Universal Studios film lot and later purchased Decca Records America, and Universal Pictures in 1962
- 1963: Comcast was founded as American Cable Systems by Ralph J. Roberts
- 1973: Decca Records America is retired as a brand and renamed to MCA Records
- 1986: General Electric acquired RCA Corp and dissolved the company while retaining ownership of NBC
- 1990: Panasonic acquired a Controlling interest in MCA, but sold it to Seagram within five years after growing costs
- 1998: MCA Records acquired Polygram N.V. from Philips and was renamed to Universal Music Group
- 2000: Seagram Entertainment was sold to Vivendi and merged with StudioCanal to become Vivendi Universal
- 2002: NBC acquired Telemundo while Comcast acquired AT&T Broadband
- 2004: Vivendi Universal was consolidated with General Electric's wholly owned NBC to form NBCUniversal, while Universal Music Group was separated
- 2013: Comcast closed its acquisition of NBCUniversal from General Electric
- 2018: Sky Group was acquired from 21st Century Fox after a bidding war
- 2020: Peacock was launched
- 2026: Majority of NBCU's cable networks were spun off into another company named Versant, while Comcast later announced it would spin-off NBCUniversal and Sky into a separate company

=== 1996–2007 ===
MSNBC's logo used from 1996 until 2009. The "N" in the logo was changed from red to black in 2002. This variant was occasionally used after 2006 as an alternative logo in a horizontal form.

MSNBC was established in 1996 via a joint venture between NBC and Microsoft organized by Tom Rogers. James Kinsella, a Microsoft executive, served as president of the online component, MSNBC.com. Microsoft invested $221 million for a 50% share of the cable channel. The network launched on July 15, 1996. The first show was anchored by Jodi Applegate and included news, interviews, and opinion pieces. The first three news stories MSNBC covered were Boris Yeltsin meeting then-vice president Al Gore despite concerns over Yeltsin's health, an update on the Bob Dole 1996 presidential campaign, and updated information about the Khobar Towers bombing. MSNBC was originally headquartered from studios in Fort Lee, New Jersey. In November 1996, MSNBC moved to new studios in Secaucus, New Jersey.

During the day, news coverage continued with The Contributors, a show that featured Ann Coulter and Laura Ingraham, as well as interactive programming coordinated by Applegate, John Gibson, and John Seigenthaler Jr. Stories were generally longer and more detailed than those of CNN. It also aired stories and breaking news coverage directly from NBC's network affiliates. Its flagship prime time newscast was The News, hosted by Brian Williams.

At launch, MSNBC positioned itself as being interactive and leveraging the Internet, with the slogan "It's Time to Get Connected", anchors' email addresses and phone numbers being regularly promoted on-air, and shows such as Internight—a primetime talk show featuring viewer questions submitted via phone and email, and The Site—a technology news program co-hosted by Soledad O'Brien and Leo Laporte (the latter as a computer-animated character known as "Dev Null").

Beginning in September 1996, MSNBC began to air a simulcast of the New York-based radio show Imus in the Morning with Don Imus. SportsCenter host Keith Olbermann left ESPN in an acrimonious split to join MSNBC in June 1997; with Internight replaced by a new 8 p.m. show known as The Big Show with Keith Olbermann. When the Monica Lewinsky scandal broke in 1998, The Big Show morphed into White House in Crisis. Olbermann became frustrated as his show was consumed by the Lewinsky story. He left MSNBC and joined FSN. Olbermann was then replaced by Dateline NBC host John Hockenberry, whose show Edgewise became popular.

In September 1997, MSNBC laid off 20% of its staff, and cancelled The Site due to low ratings and frequent pre-emptions for coverage of the deaths of Princess Diana and Mother Teresa. That show was replaced by Headliners and Legends, a biography program that became a weekend staple on the network.

A fictionalized version of MSNBC was featured in Deep Impact (1998).

In 1999, Hardball with Chris Matthews moved to MSNBC and replaced Hockenberry's 8PM show Edgewise. Prior to this, Chris Matthews hosted Politics with Chris Matthews on MSNBC predecessor America's Talking. Hardball ran to March 2020.

In January 2001, Mike Barnicle's show was launched, but it was canceled in June 2001 because of high production costs.

Beginning in January 2001, Mitch Albom hosted his own two-hour program The Mitch Albom Show as an experimental cross-network feature that lasted a few months. Because it was produced primarily for radio listeners, it did not fit the traditional, visually driven cable news format.

In early 2001, Erik Sorenson was named president of MSNBC. Ashleigh Banfield was hired as an anchor to attract a younger audience. Banfield was present during the collapse of 7 World Trade Center while covering the September 11 attacks. Her Region in Conflict program showcased exclusive interviews from Afghanistan.

MSNBC began calling itself "America's NewsChannel" and hired Alan Keyes, Phil Donahue, Pat Buchanan, and Tucker Carlson. This branding makeover, however, was followed by declining ratings.

The News with Brian Williams was relocated to CNBC in 2002.

In December 2005, NBC Universal announced its acquisition of an additional 32% share of MSNBC from Microsoft. The news website msnbc.com remained a separate joint venture between Microsoft and NBC until 2012.

Two years later, NBC exercised its option to purchase Microsoft's remaining 18% interest in MSNBC.

In June 2006, Rick Kaplan resigned as president of MSNBC after holding the post for two years. Dan Abrams, a nine-year veteran of MSNBC and NBC News, was named general manager of MSNBC. NBC News senior vice president Phil Griffin oversaw MSNBC while continuing to oversee Today, with Abrams reporting to Griffin. That month, Abrams announced the revamp of MSNBC's early-primetime and primetime schedule.

In July 2006, Tucker (formerly The Situation with Tucker Carlson) started airing at 4PM and 6PM ET, taking over Abrams' old timeslot, while Rita Cosby's Live & Direct was canceled. Cosby was made the primary anchor for MSNBC Investigates at 10PM and 11PM ET, a new program that took over Cosby and Carlson's timeslots.

In August 2006, Keith Olbermann began critiquing and satirizing conservative media commentators such as Bill O'Reilly and politicians such as George W. Bush during his Countdown With Keith Olbermann program; this attracted liberal viewers and ratings of the show doubled.

In September 2007, Abrams announced that he was leaving his general manager position so he could focus on his 9PM ET talk show, Live With Dan Abrams. Oversight of MSNBC was shifted to Phil Griffin.

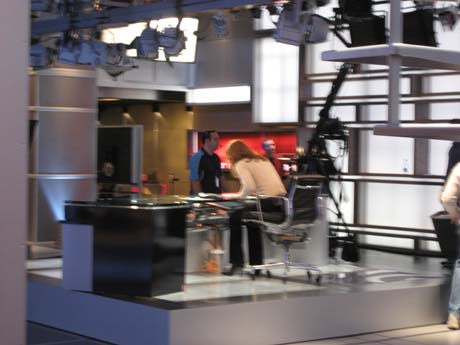
MSNBC's studio in NYC

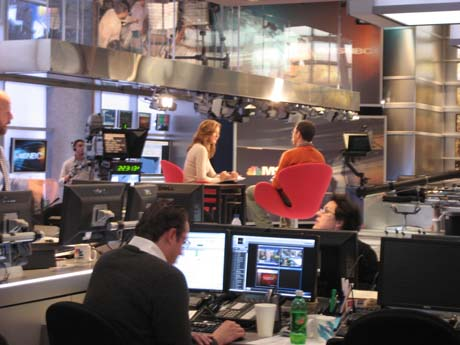
The MSNBC studio

In October 2007, MSNBC and NBC News began broadcasting from new studios at 30 Rockefeller Plaza in New York City. The extensive renovations of the associated studios allowed NBC to merge its entire news operation into one building. All MSNBC broadcasts and NBC Nightly News originate from the new studios. MSNBC also announced new studios near the Universal Studios lot. MSNBC's master control did not make the move to 30 Rockefeller Plaza. It remained in the old Secaucus headquarters until it completed its move to the NBC Universal Network Origination Center inside the CNBC Global Headquarters building in Englewood Cliffs, New Jersey in 2007. In January 2009, Major League Baseball began using the former MSNBC building in Secaucus for MLB Network.

=== 2008–2015 ===
MSNBC logo used from 2009 to 2015

From mid-2007 to mid-2008, MSNBC enjoyed a large increase in its Nielsen ratings. Primetime viewings increased by 61%.

Tucker Carlson's program was canceled in March 2008 and replaced at the 6PM slot with Race for the White House, hosted by David Gregory. The show was renamed 1600 Pennsylvania Avenue in November, after the election. When Gregory became the permanent host for Meet the Press, he stepped down as host of his MSNBC show, and David Shuster became the permanent host for the show.

The death of Tim Russert in June 2008 led to a period of transition as NBC contemplated how he could be replaced.

In July 2008, former CNN producer Phil Griffin was announced as President of MSNBC, replacing Dan Abrams. He worked with NBC for over 25 years, including working for MSNBC since its launch.

During the 2008 United States presidential election, MSNBC's coverage was anchored by Olbermann, Chris Matthews, and David Gregory. During the first three months of the presidential campaign, MSNBC's ratings grew by 158%. Olbermann and Matthews, however, were criticized for expressing left-leaning opinions on the channel. Both were later removed from anchor positions. Audience viewership ahead of the 2008 elections more than doubled from the 2004 United States presidential election, and the channel topped CNN in ratings for the first time during the last three months of the campaign in the key 25–54 age demographic.

In September 2008, the channel hired Rachel Maddow to host The Rachel Maddow Show in the 9PM slot, replacing Verdict with Dan Abrams. Reviews for the show were mostly positive. The move to create a new program for the network was widely seen as a smart ratings move, where beforehand, the network lagged behind in coveted primetime ratings. The show began to regularly outperform CNN's Larry King Live, and made the network competitive in the program's time slot for the first time in over a decade.

In March 2009, MSNBC finished in second place in primetime, ahead of CNN for the first time. Phil Griffin attributed this to the network's decision to go liberal with Olbermann and Maddow along with problems at CNN.

On several dates in March 2009, Ed Schultz served as a substitute host for David Shuster on 1600 Pennsylvania Avenue. In April 2009, Schultz was given the 6PM ET slot with The Ed Show, replacing 1600 Pennsylvania Avenue, with Shuster being reassigned by the network as substitute host for Olbermann on Countdown.

In June 2009, MSNBC launched a 1080i high-definition television simulcast feed, MSNBC HD.

Morning Meeting with Dylan Ratigan, a news show hosted by Dylan Ratigan, debuted in June 2009 as part of changes to MSNBC's weekday daytime program schedule, along with a revamp of the channel's graphics and the launch of its high definition simulcast feed. The show was relaunched as The Dylan Ratigan Show in January 2010. The change was made to make room for The Daily Rundown with Chuck Todd and Savannah Guthrie at 9AM, as part of MSNBC's commitment to straight news programming during the day. The show focused on debate and discussion relating to politics and the economy. Ratigan often offered commentary on the subject matter and rebuttal to many of the guests who appear on the show.

In the first quarter of 2010, MSNBC beat CNN in primetime and overall ratings for the first time since 2001. Morning Joe, The Ed Show, Hardball with Chris Matthews, Countdown with Keith Olbermann, and The Rachel Maddow Show finished ahead of their time slot competitors at CNN.

In the third quarter of 2010, MSNBC beat CNN in total day for the first time since the second quarter of 2001 in the key adult demographic. MSNBC also beat CNN for the fourth consecutive quarter, among both primetime and total viewers, and became the only cable news network to have its key adult demographic viewership grow during the quarter, increasing by 4%. MSNBC also became the number-one cable news network in primetime among both African American and Hispanic viewers.

In April 2010, MSNBC launched on XM Satellite Radio and Sirius Satellite Radio. This is the second time MSNBC has been available on satellite radio. The channel was dropped from XM Radio in September 2006.

Lawrence O'Donnell began hosting a 10PM show on MSNBC called The Last Word with Lawrence O'Donnell, which premiered in September 2010, replacing Countdown.

In October 2010, MSNBC unveiled a $2 million marketing campaign, "Lean Forward". Griffin considered the two-year campaign an effort to promote the channel as a progressive competitor to the conservative-leaning Fox News Channel.

In January 2011, Olbermann announced his departure from MSNBC. MSNBC issued a statement that it had ended its contract with Olbermann, with no further explanation. Olbermann took his show to Current TV.

In July 2012, Microsoft sold its stake in MSNBC.com to NBCUniversal for $300 million; concurrently, the website was rebranded as NBCNews.com, while MSNBC.com was relaunched as a website for the channel itself. Concerns were raised by NBC News executives over potential confusion between the two properties due to their diverging editorial scopes, since MSNBC.com was largely a general-interest news website, while MSNBC pivoted towards political commentary. In 2013, msnbc.com was relaunched as the website for the MSNBC channel.

NBCUniversal News Group was created in July 2012, under chairwoman Pat Fili-Krushel composed of NBC News, CNBC, and MSNBC.

In 2014, MSNBC's total ratings in the 25–54 demographic declined 20%, falling to third place behind CNN. Nevertheless, MSNBC retained its lead among the Hispanic and African-American demographics.

In July 2014, msnbc.com launched msnbc2, a brand for several web-only series hosted by MSNBC personalities. In December 2014, msnbc2 was renamed shift, with a programming schedule that was less focused on politics and more tailored to a younger audience. It was shut in 2015.

=== 2015–2021 ===
MSNBC logo used from 2015 to 2021

Andrew Lack became the chairman of NBC News and MSNBC in 2015. He imposed a mandate on the network to reduce its emphasis on opinion programming, and place a larger focus on creating closer ties between it and NBC News.

In 2015, Griffin announced he was transitioning MSNBC from left-leaning, opinionated programming to hard news programming. Nearly all daytime opinionated news programs were replaced with more generic news programs. Ronan Farrow, Joy Reid, Krystal Ball, Touré, Abby Huntsman, Alex Wagner, and Ed Schultz lost their shows. Al Sharpton's PoliticsNation was relegated to the weekend. News programs presented by established NBC News personalities such as Telemundo anchor Jose Diaz-Balart, Meet the Press anchor Chuck Todd, NBC Nightly News Sunday anchor Kate Snow, Thomas Roberts, and former NBC Nightly News anchor Brian Williams replaced the opinion shows. In February 2015, to focus on breaking news after significant rating declines, "MSNBC Live With Thomas Roberts" replaced “Ronan Farrow Daily” and "The Reid Report" between 1PM and 3PM. Daytime news coverage was led primarily by Brian Williams, Stephanie Ruhle, Jose Diaz-Balart, Andrea Mitchell, Craig Melvin, Thomas Roberts, and Kate Snow, in addition to "beat leaders" stationed throughout the newsroom. These included chief legal correspondent Ari Melber, primary political reporter Steve Kornacki, business and finance correspondent Olivia Sterns, and senior editor Cal Perry. The revamped on-air presentation debuted in late summer 2015 and included a new logo, news ticker, and graphics package.

In July 2016, MSNBC launched Dateline Extra, which was an abridged version of Dateline NBC and another step towards aligning MSNBC and NBC News. The new program was hosted by MSNBC Live anchor Tamron Hall.

In September 2016, MSNBC launched The 11th Hour with Brian Williams, a new 11 p.m. program that initially served as a daily recap of headlines relating to the 2016 presidential election.

In January 2017, MSNBC debuted For the Record with Greta at 6PM hosted by former Fox News Channel anchor Greta Van Susteren. The program aired for six months before being cancelled in late June 2017 due to a ratings flop. The network's chief legal correspondent, Ari Melber was given a show, The Beat with Ari Melber, at 6PM.

In March 2017, MSNBC began to increase its use of the NBC News branding during daytime news programming, as part of an effort to emphasize MSNBC's relationship with the division. Promotional campaigns including the slogan "This is who we are" were aired in March 2017, featuring network personalities explaining parallels between politics and activities such as sports.

In May 2017, MSNBC introduced Deadline: White House, a late night program hosted by NBC political analyst and former White House communications director Nicolle Wallace. That month, during the first presidency of Donald Trump, MSNBC became the highest rated American cable news network in primetime among adults aged 25–54 for the first time, beating both Fox News and CNN as it covered allegations of Russian interference in the 2016 United States elections. However, it was ranked last in daytime viewership.

In April 2018, MSNBC premiered Morning Joe First Look to replace Way Too Early. MSNBC also retired its on-air news ticker, citing a desire to reduce distractions and "[put] our reporting more front and center".

In March 2020, Chris Matthews resigned from Hardball and MSNBC amid controversy over remarks he made during coverage of the 2020 Nevada Democratic presidential caucuses that compared Bernie Sanders' victory to the Battle of France. The hour was hosted by a rotation of anchors until July 2020, when MSNBC premiered The ReidOut with Joy Reid.

to increase the network's investment into documentary-style programs, and create a new organizational structure to news programming and "perspective and analysis" programming.

In January 2021, due to the January 6 United States Capitol attack, MSNBC had its highest-rated week ever, exceeding the ratings of Fox News for the first time since 2000.

=== 2021–2024 ===
MSNBC logo used from 2021 to 2023

In December 2020, Phil Griffin stepped down from the network, and it was announced that NBC News' then-senior vice president of special programming Rashida Jones would succeeded him as president of MSNBC beginning in 2021; she became the first African-American woman to lead a U.S. cable news channel Jones would aim to create a larger distinction between news and analysis programming to "create more opportunities for collaboration" across the network (with Daniel Arnall and The Last Word EP Greg Kordick named senior vice presidents of news and analysis respectively), and announced plans to appoint a head of documentary acquisitions to oversee an expansion in long-form content.

In March 2021, MSNBC introduced a refreshed logo and on-air imaging, including a rebranding of its MSNBC Live rolling news block as MSNBC Reports (with each block carrying the anchor's name, patterned after the existing daytime show Andrea Mitchell Reports). Under Jones, MSNBC began to scale back its integrations with NBC News, with some personalities and reporters leaving the network, or prioritizing contributions to NBC News' streaming channel NBC News Now instead.

MSNBC gained a presence on NBCUniversal's Peacock streaming service by co-branding its streaming hub "The Choice" as "The Choice by MSNBC" in July 2021; it included original news and opinion programs with personalities such as Mehdi Hasan, Zerlina Maxwell, and Sam Seder. In March 2022, it was replaced by an MSNBC hub, which included next-day, on-demand streaming of selected MSNBC programs, as well as specials and documentaries.

In November 2021, Brian Williams announced his departure from NBC News and MSNBC after 28 years, with his final edition of The 11th Hour scheduled for December 9; after a transitional period covered by guest hosts, Stephanie Ruhle became the new host of The 11th Hour beginning March 2, with her existing hour of MSNBC Reports replaced by a new fourth hour of Morning Joe in April 2022.

As part of her new contract with NBCUniversal, Rachel Maddow took an extended hiatus from her program to focus on other film and podcast projects; she was replaced with rotating guest hosts. When she returned, beginning in May 2022, she only hosted the show on Monday nights and featured guest hosts throughout the rest of the week. The guest hosts appeared under the MSNBC Prime banner until August 2022, when Alex Wagner became the permanent host in the timeslot with Alex Wagner Tonight.

In October 2022, ahead of the midterm elections, The Last Word with Lawrence O'Donnell was temporarily replaced on Friday evenings by The Kornacki Countdown, a weekly series hosted by MSNBC political analyst Steve Kornacki.

In November 2022, MSNBC parted ways with Tiffany Cross; her show The Cross Connection, was temporarily replaced by guest hosts under the MSNBC Reports banner.

In March 2023, MSNBC premiered the Sunday-morning program Inside with Jen Psaki, hosted by former White House press secretary Jen Psaki. Between February and September 2023, the Monday edition of All in with Chris Hayes also featured rotating guest hosts, with Chris Hayes only hosting from Tuesdays to Fridays to accommodate Hayes' other projects. In September 2023, the program was replaced by an additional Monday-night edition of Inside with Jen Psaki.

In December 2023, MSNBC announced that Luke Russert would return to the network to lead its new live event franchise "MSNBC Live".

In January 2024, MSNBC revamped its weekend schedule, ending Mehdi Hasan's 9 p.m. show on Sundays, and introducing The Weekend—a weekend morning panel show with Alicia Menendez, Symone Sanders-Townsend, and Michael Steele. Yasmin Vossoughian Reports, Symone, and American Voices were cancelled, The Sunday/Saturday Show with Jonathan Capehart was moved into the 6PM slot and The Katie Phang Show was moved to 12 p.m. on Saturdays. Ayman was expanded to two hours each on Saturdays and Sundays, and Alex Witt Reports took over Yasmin Vossoughian's vacated two hours, now airing from 1–4 p.m. on Saturdays and Sundays. The 5 p.m. hour was filled by the week-in-review programs The Beat Weekend and MSNBC Prime Weekend on Saturday and Sunday respectively.

=== 2024–present ===
MSNBC logo used from 2023 to 2025

==== NBCU spinoff, personnel changes ====
On November 20, 2024, NBCUniversal announced its intent to spin off most of its cable networks, including MSNBC, as a new publicly traded company controlled by Comcast shareholders, and later officially named Versant. Following the announcement, reports emerged of multiple unsolicited offers to buy MSNBC; CNN media analyst Brian Stelter believed it was unlikely MSNBC would be sold, as NBCUniversal never declared any intent to divest properties when announcing the spin-off (with future CEO Mark Lazarus contrarily suggesting that the spin-off planned to target further investments and acquisitions), a sale would incur taxes (the spin-off was structured to be tax-free), and that divesting the channel might not be seen as being in the best interest of shareholders.

From January through April 2025, The Rachel Maddow Show returned to a weeknight schedule to cover the first hundred days of the second presidency of Donald Trump. During this time, Alex Wagner Tonight was placed on hiatus, and Wagner was placed on special assignment duty.

In January 2025, Rashida Jones resigned as head of MSNBC. After acting as interim president, Rebecca Kutler was appointed president of MSNBC in February 2025. In preparation for the NBCU spin-off, Kutler began moving to expand the network's in-house newsgathering resources so that it could operate independently from NBC News. On February 24, 2025, Kutler announced a revamp to MSNBC's primetime schedule, including the cancellation of its primetiime shows The ReidOut and Alex Wagner Tonight (with Joy Reid leaving the network effective immediately, and Wagner retained as a senior political correspondent), and a new show hosted by the panel of The Weekend. Due to the planned closure of its studios in Miami, MSNBC also cancelled José Díaz-Balart and Katie Phang's programs, with Díaz-Balart focusing on his roles at NBC News and Noticias Telemundo, and Phang later moving to the progressive podcast network MeidasTouch.

Most of the staff that worked The Rachel Maddow Show and Alex Wagner Tonight were laid off and invited to reapply internally for new positions or receive severance packages. On that night's episode of The Rachel Maddow Show, Maddow criticized the changes and treatment of employees on-air, commenting that the release of Reid was "a bad mistake", and that the concurrent cancellations of multiple shows hosted by people of color (including Reid, Wagner, and Phang) was "unnerving".

On May 5, MSNBC premiered The Weeknight as its new 7 p.m. show, initially hosted by Alicia Menendez, Symone Sanders-Townsend, and Michael Steele. In addition, Inside with Jen Psaki was renamed The Briefing with Jen Psaki and expanded to a Tuesday–Friday schedule to replace Alex Wagner Tonight. The Weekend was also relaunched with a new panel consisting of Jonathan Capehart, Jacqueline Alemany, and new senior Washington correspondent Eugene Daniels, while a new evening edition known as The Weekend: Primetime would feature Ayman Mohyeldin, Catherine Rampell, Antonia Hylton, and Elise Jordan.

In April 2025, Steve Kornacki left MSNBC, focusing on a role as chief data analyst for NBC News and NBC Sports. Over mid-2025, MSNBC also hired Ken Dilanian, Vaughn Hillyard, David Noriega, Brandy Zadrozny, and Jacob Soboroff, with Soboroff named senior national and political correspondent.

==== Rebranding as MS NOW ====
In August 2025, it was announced that as part of the Versant spin-off, MSNBC would rebrand as MS NOW later in the year to signify its separation from NBC News. The name is a backronym of "My Source [for] News, Opinion, [and the] World"; a name that contained "MS", reflecting original part-owner Microsoft, was chosen to maintain brand awareness, as "MS" had also been used as a shorthand name for the channel. The network also planned to relocate from NBC Studios to Versant's interim headquarters at the former New York Times Building on 229 West 43rd Street.

In September 2025, MSNBC reached an agreement with Sky News to use its resources for international news coverage. MSNBC began to separate its editorial operations from NBC News in October 2025, and its use of NBC News correspondents was gradually reduced over the course of the month. Versant also reached agreements with Comcast sister company Sky News to provide international news coverage, and AccuWeather to provide weather data and forecasts for both MS NOW and CNBC, and allow its meteorologists to appear as guests during weather events. MSNBC also hired former CBS News reporter David Parkinson to serve as senior weather and election data analyst, and Moses Small from KGTV/San Diego as a climate reporter.

A $20 million advertising campaign entitled "We the People" and featuring the tagline "Same mission. New name." was launched in November 2025, coinciding with the 2025 United States elections. It included two television commercials featuring vignettes of American life and MS NOW personalities, accompanied by readings of the U.S. Constitution by Rachel Maddow and Maya Angelou's 1996 reading of her poem "The Human Family" to the United Nations. The "We The People" branding was later adopted by other facets of the network; beginning with its coverage of the 2026 United States elections, MS NOW branded its election coverage as We the People (year), replacing the Decision branding that was inherited from NBC News.

The rebranding took effect on November 15, 2025. Alongside the rebrand, MS NOW also introduced its new New York City studios at 229 West 43rd Street; the facility consists of three main studios, including the main Studio 9A (which carries over visual elements from MSNBC's former Studio 3A at NBC Studios) and 9C, and a three-sided LED volume (Studio 9B). The new studios were constructed in three months, and used existing broadcasting infrastructure that had been installed by previous tenants such as BuzzFeed News. Master control and other technical functions are handled from CNBC's headquarters in Englewood Cliffs, New Jersey.

With the rebranding of the channel as MS NOW, its website was moved to ms.now, and MS NOW programs were dropped from Peacock; in December 2025, the network announced plans to launch its own OTT subscription offering in the future, which would focus on being a "digital hub for progressives" and offer access to live virtual events featuring its personalities.

In February 2026, MS NOW announced a partnership with Crooked Media, in which the channel will air Crooked on MS NOW—a weekly program featuring highlights from its podcasts (such as Pod Save America)—on Saturday nights beginning February 28.

On June 15, 2026, MS NOW began a revamp of its daytime schedule, with Stephanie Ruhle returning to daytime to host the new 9-11 a.m. block Money, Power, Politics, Alicia Menendez moving from The Weeknight to host the new 12–2 p.m. show On the Line, and Katy Tur Reports being rebranded as The Moment. Meanwhile, Morning Joe reverted back to three hours from 6-9 a.m. with Jonathan Lemire being co-host of the third hour, Luke Russert joined The Weeknight to succeed Menendez, Ali Velshi moved to The 11th Hour to succeed Ruhle, and his existing weekend show Velshi was replaced by Connect with Jacob Soboroff. Chris Jansing remained with the network as its chief political correspondent, while Ana Cabrera departed the network. MS NOW also planned to launch a new 11 a.m. program anchored by chief national correspondent Peter Alexander, which later premiered on August 10 as State of Play. Kutler stated that these changes were part of an effort to strengthen MS NOW's daytime lineup while maintaining its larger focus on hard news coverage.

On June 26, 2026, MS NOW cancelled The Weekend: Primetime (with its final episode airing that weekend), and announced that weekend anchor Alex Witt would depart the network after nearly 30 years; Witt was succeeded by former The Weekend: Primetime panelist Antonia Hylton, with Alex Witt Reports replaced by The Assignment with Antonia Hylton beginning on September 12. Kutler stated that MS NOW was moving away from live evening programming on weekends to prioritize its upcoming direct-to-consumer offering, and that the daypart will focus primarily on television versions of MS NOW podcasts (such as The Best People with Nicolle Wallace) and other acquired programming—citing the Crooked Media partnership as an example of this strategy. Kutler stated that despite the cuts, MS NOW still planned to air around 20 hours of live weekend programming per-week, and would still air live breaking news coverage when warranted.

On September 9, 2026, MS NOW launched its direct-to-consumer subscription service, branded as the "MS NOW membership"; alongside live streaming of the network and digital-exclusive shows (such Rachel Maddow: In Conversation With…, Political Potluck with Claire McCaskill, Off the Charts with Ali Velshi, and The Very Last Word with Lawrence O’Donnell), the service includes a "community hub" featuring forum discussions with network personalities and columnists, live streams of MS NOW's in-person events and interactive virtual events, and a partnership with Calm.

== Demographics ==
A study by Pew Research Center in 2014 found that MSNBC's audience was more moderate than that of BuzzFeed, Politico, The Washington Post, and The New York Times, but slightly more liberal than CNN's audience.

A survey by Pew Research Center in 2019 showed that among Americans who named MSNBC as their main source for political news, 74% are ages 50 or older, with 44% ages 65 or older. 95% of those who named MSNBC as their main political news source identify as Democrats; among the eight most commonly named main sources for political and election news by US adults, MSNBC and Fox News have the most partisan audiences.

== Carriage ==
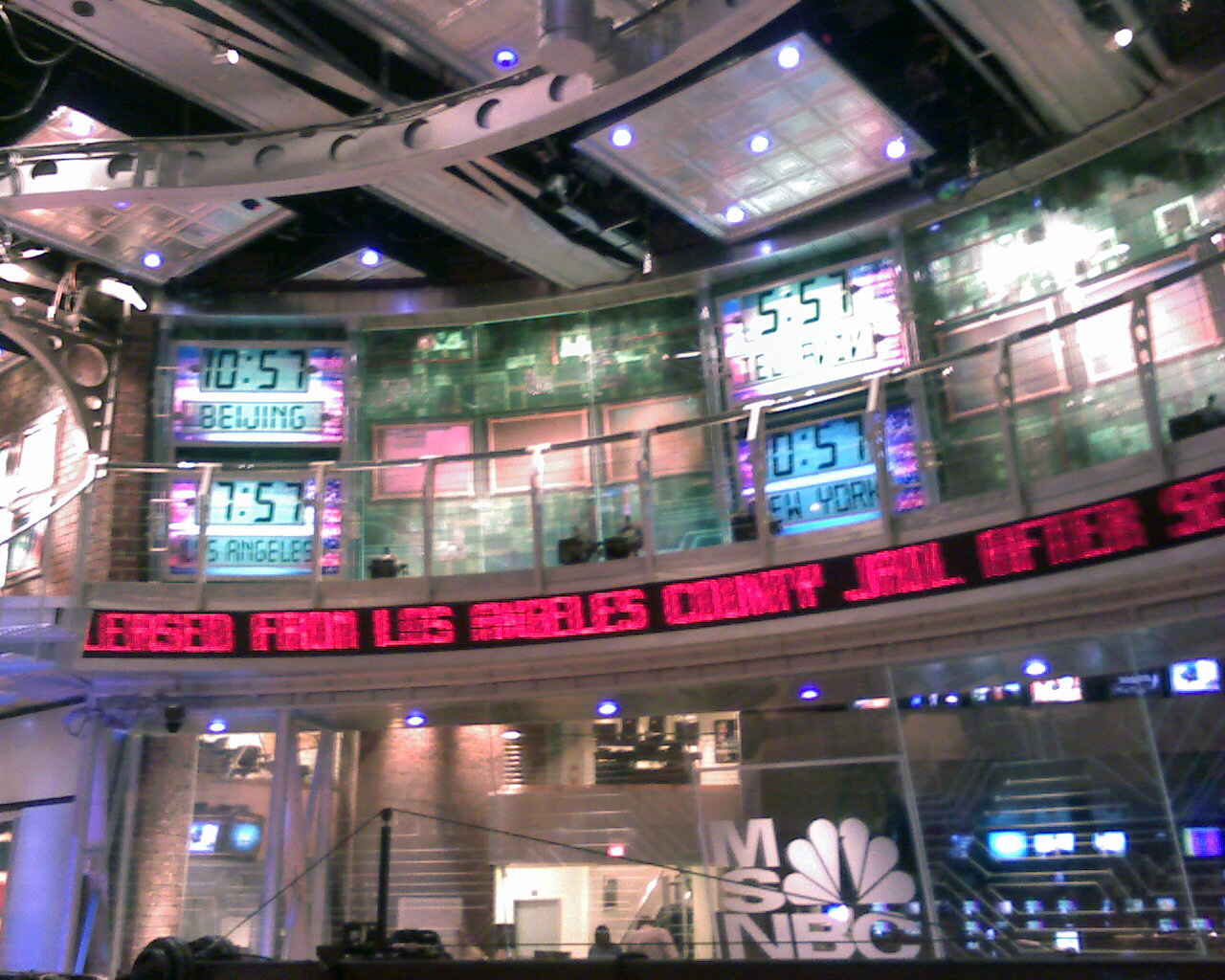
MSNBC's former New Jersey headquarters studio, now the home of MLB Network

Before 2010, MSNBC was not available to Verizon FiOS and AT&T U-verse television subscribers in the portions of New York, northern New Jersey, and Connecticut that overlapped Cablevision's service area. One of several reasons for this was an exclusive carriage agreement between MSNBC and Cablevision that prohibited competing wired providers from carrying MSNBC. In 2009, Verizon filed a formal "program-access complaint" with the Federal Communications Commission and petitioned for termination of the deal. In support of Verizon, Connecticut Attorney General Richard Blumenthal argued that the arrangement could be illegal. After entering into a new contract, FiOS added MSNBC in New York City and New Jersey in February 2010.

== International availability ==
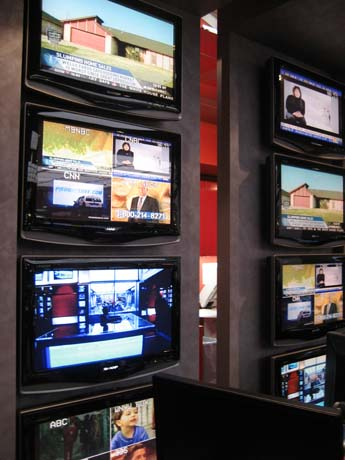
The monitors of the MSNBC newsroom are tuned into various global channels.

MSNBC Canada, a joint venture between Rogers Communications, Shaw Communications, and MSNBC (each holding a 33.33% interest), was in operation from September 2001 to 2004. The channel faced logistics difficulty due to requirements by the Canadian Radio-television and Telecommunications Commission that channels carry a certain percentage of Canadian content. As a result, it was replaced with a direct feed from MSNBC.

In Australia, MSNBC launched November 2019 on the Fetch TV online PayTV network, on channel 171. As in Canada, this is a direct US feed of MS NOW, without any delay. Although Fetch TV has no MS NOW catch-up channel/service, it also offers MS NOW programs on a reverse EPG which allows any shows from the previous 24 hours to be selected and watched. The channel was added to subscription-television outlet Foxtel and its streaming service Flash in April 2023, as part of a negotiated programming agreement between the Foxtel Group and NBCUniversal. It was also added to Binge, another of Foxtel's streaming services, in October 2023.

In Asia and Europe, MS NOW is not shown on a dedicated channel.

In Turkey, NTV-MSNBC was a joint venture with NTV Turkey; it shut down in December 2014.

In 2007, MSNBC expanded to South Africa, reaching a deal to become the "exclusive news provider" to Southern Africa’s Free2View TV satellite service.

== Political stance ==
=== Allegations of liberal bias ===
As of 2024, MSNBC's evening programming features progressive hosts. In November 2007, a New York Times article stated that MSNBC's primetime lineup was tilting more to the left. Since then, some commentators have argued that MSNBC has a bias towards liberal politics and the Democratic Party. Washington Post media analyst Howard Kurtz said in 2008 that the channel's evening lineup "has clearly gravitated to the left in recent years and often seems to regard itself as the antithesis of Fox News." In 2011, Politico referred to MSNBC as "left-leaning", and Steve Kornacki of Salon.com stated that, "MSNBC's prime-time lineup is now awash in progressive politics." Regarding changes in the channel's evening programming, senior vice president of NBC News Phil Griffin said that "it happened naturally. There isn't a dogma we're putting through. There is a 'Go for it.'"

In the February 2008 issue of Men's Journal magazine, an MSNBC interviewee quoted a senior executive as saying that liberal commentator Keith Olbermann "runs MSNBC" and that "because of his success, he's in charge" of the channel. In 2007, The New York Times called Olbermann MSNBC's "most recognizable face". In September 2008, MSNBC stated that Olbermann and Chris Matthews would no longer anchor live political events, with David Gregory assuming that role. MSNBC cited the growing criticism that they were "too opinionated to be seen as neutral in the heat of the presidential campaign". Olbermann's show Countdown continued to run before and after the presidential and vice presidential debates, and both Matthews and Olbermann joined Gregory on the channel's election night coverage.

In November 2009, just before the release of Sarah Palin's book Going Rogue, MSNBC's Dylan Ratigan used photoshopped pictures of Palin on the channel's Morning Meeting program. Ratigan apologized a few days later.

In October 2010, MSNBC began using the tagline "Lean Forward". Some media outlets, including msnbc.com, claimed that the network was now embracing its politically progressive identity.

In January 2012, MSNBC used Rachel Maddow, Chris Matthews, and other network commentators during its coverage of the Iowa Republican caucuses. Nando Di Fino of the Mediaite website said MSNBC was "giving up on the straight news coverage, and instead [appearing] to be aiming to create some controversy".

In November 2012, The New York Times called MSNBC "The Anti-Fox" and quoted former President Bill Clinton as saying, "Boy, it really has become our version of Fox." Citing data from the A.C. Nielsen TV ratings service, the article noted that while the Fox News Channel had a larger overall viewership than MSNBC, the two networks were separated by only around 300,000 viewers among the 25–54 age bracket most attractive to advertisers.

In the Pew Research Center's 2013 "State of the News Media" report, MSNBC was found to be the most opinionated news network, with 85% of the content being commentary or opinions and the remaining 15% being factual reporting. The report also stated that in 2012, MSNBC spent only $240 million on news production compared to CNN's $682 million and the Fox News Channel's $820 million.

In October 2019, American socialist magazine Jacobin argued that "MSNBC embodies the politics and sensibility of Trump-era liberalism.", but argued that MSNBC "wasn't always liberal".

Writing for the Poynter Institute for Media Studies in February 2021, senior media writer Tom Jones argued that the primary distinction between MSNBC and Fox News is not left bias vs. right bias, but rather that much of the content on Fox News, especially during its primetime programs, is not based in truth.

Under NBC News head Cesar Conde, the division had made moves to incorporate more diverse viewpoints—including from conservative perspectives—in its output outside of MSNBC (including Meet the Press) to counter concerns from NBC's affiliate body that MSNBC's partisan content reflected upon the division as a whole. These moves coincided with MSNBC's own changes in leadership, which resulted in a gradual increase in opinion programming, and as a result, a gradual decrease in talent sharing with the remainder of NBC News.

==== 2008 United States presidential election ====
During the 2008 election, MSNBC was accused of bias in favor of Barack Obama and bias against primary challenger Hillary Clinton. During the conventions, Matthews and Olbermann had a bitter argument on the air. As a result, David Gregory took over as the only news anchor of debates and election night.

In the fall of 2008, MSNBC had a new channel slogan called "The Power of Change", which put emphasis on Obama's "change" rhetoric.

==== Obama era ====
Some Democratic Party supporters, including former Pennsylvania governor Ed Rendell and Bill Clinton advisor Lanny Davis, criticized MSNBC during and after the 2008 Democratic Party presidential primaries as covering Barack Obama more favorably than Hillary Clinton. In January 2011, Rendell became an on-air contributor to MSNBC.

A study done by the Project for Excellence in Journalism showed that MSNBC had less negative coverage of Obama with 14% of stories versus 29% in the press overall and more negative stories about Republican presidential candidate John McCain with 73% of its coverage versus 57% in the press overall. MSNBC's on-air slogan during the week of the 2008 presidential election, "The Power of Change", was criticized for being too similar to Obama's campaign slogan of "Hope and Change". After the election, conservative talk show host John Ziegler made a documentary entitled Media Malpractice... How Obama Got Elected, which was very critical of the media's role, especially MSNBC's, in the election. While promoting the documentary, he had an on-air dispute with MSNBC news anchor Contessa Brewer about how the media, especially MSNBC, had portrayed Sarah Palin.

During MSNBC's coverage of the Potomac primary, MSNBC's Chris Matthews said, "I have to tell you, you know, it's part of reporting this case, this election, the feeling most people get when they hear Barack Obama's speech. My, I felt this thrill going up my leg. I mean, I don't have that too often." This led conservative media to assert that both he and MSNBC were biased toward Obama.

==== Rise of the New Right documentary ====
In June 2010, the MSNBC documentary Rise of the New Right aired. It featured interviews with right-wing figures, including Dick Armey, the former House majority leader, Orly Taitz, a leading figure in the "birther" movement, and conspiracy theorist radio host Alex Jones. The documentary also showed the Michigan Militia's survival training camp and hit the campaign trail with Kentucky senatorial candidate Rand Paul.

The documentary angered Tea Party movement figures and others on the right. After the documentary aired, FreedomWorks, chaired by Armey, called for a boycott of Dawn and Procter & Gamble, which advertised during Hardball with Chris Matthews.

==== Romney coverage during 2012 election ====
A study by the Pew Research Center found that MSNBC's coverage of Mitt Romney during the final week of the 2012 United States presidential election of 68% negative with no positive stories in the sample was far more negative than the overall press, and even more negative than it had been during October 1 to 28, when 5% was positive, and 57% was negative. However, coverage of Barack Obama improved in the final week before the presidential election. From 1 to October 28, 33% of stories were positive and 13% negative. During the campaign's final week, 51% of MSNBC's stories were positive, while there were no negative stories about Obama in the sample.

==== Trump era ====
MSNBC received significant criticism and accusations of a liberal bias from Donald Trump and his supporters. In social media posts, Trump has frequently referred to MSNBC as "MSDNC", (accusing the network of acting as an arm to the Democratic National Committee), classified the network as part of the "fake news media", and claimed the network's viewership ratings were in decline. Trump has also directly criticized MSNBC shows and hosts as well, including Morning Joe, where, in 2017, Trump referred to host Mika Brzezinski as "low I.Q. Crazy Mika" and Joe Scarborough as "Psycho Joe" in a tweet. In May 2025, Trump accused MSNBC of committing a "Major Campaign Violation" after statements critical of Trump's Liberation Day tariffs were made by hosts on the network. In August 2025, Trump referred to Deadline: White House host Nicolle Wallace as a "loser", and predicted that she would be fired from the network.

=== Allegations of conservative bias ===
Others have argued that MSNBC has a bias against progressive politics. Phil Donahue's show was canceled in 2003 due to his opposition to the Iraq War, and Donahue later commented that the management of MSNBC required that "we have two conservative (guests) for every liberal. I was counted as two liberals."

Cenk Uygur, after his departure from MSNBC in 2011, said that MSNBC management had told him "people in Washington" were "concerned about [his] tone", and that he "didn't want to work in a place that didn't challenge power".

MSNBC anchors tend to be conservative or centrist and wealthy.

In 2000, host Joe Scarborough received a 95 rating from the American Conservative Union and supported anti-abortion policies when he was a U.S. representative, while host Stephanie Ruhle, a former hedge fund manager, declared, "I don't have any political ideals that I'm tied to." Former host Chris Matthews identifies as a "liberal" but voted for George W. Bush in 2000, while current host Nicolle Wallace, a registered Republican, worked for both Bush and Sarah Palin.

=== Lack of diversity of views ===
Maria Bustillos noted in 2019 that "MSNBC's bland, evenhanded respectability is buttressed with a careful performance of diversity both 'ideological' and demographic", and that "the network actively discourages consideration of its anchors' personal convictions" in favor of "interchangeable 'television personalities'" who are "compressed into the network's identity and subservient to it". It has been argued that MSNBC, like other cable networks, "is simply not incentivized to be informative", and instead turns its "viewers into partisan junkies who don't change the channel because they need a fix that tells them they're right about everything (and that the other side is wrong)." In 2014, Jason Linkins claimed that MSNBC prefers "the incessant production of insidery ideations" over "the service of the public trust in an honest and equitable way".

=== Melissa Harris-Perry's comments on Romney's black grandchild ===
Political commentator Melissa Harris-Perry and her guest panel, in a look back on the 2013 segment of her show, featured a picture of former Republican presidential candidate Mitt Romney and his extended family. Romney was holding on his knee his adopted grandchild, Kieran Romney, an African-American. Harris-Perry and her guests, including actress Pia Glenn and comedian Dean Obeidallah, joked about coming up with captions for the photo. Glenn sang out, "One of these things is not like the others, one of these things just isn't the same." Obeidallah said, "It sums up the diversity of the Republican Party and the [Republican National Committee], where they have the whole convention and they find the one black person." Afterwards, Harris-Perry gave an on-air apology as well as apologized in a series of tweets.

=== Coverage of the 2020 Democratic primary ===
In February 2019, NBC ran a story about presidential candidate Tulsi Gabbard claiming that her campaign was benefiting from Russian state media, stating that she had received twice as many mentions on RT, Sputnik News and Russia Insider compared to expected front-runners Bernie Sanders and Joe Biden.

In March 2019, Yashar Ali, a contributor for HuffPost accused Dafna Linzer, a managing editor at MSNBC, of ceding editorial control to the Democratic National Committee. Ali, who planned to announce the locations of the DNC debates in advance of MSNBC, received a call attempting to dissuade him with the phrase "let them make a few phone calls", referring to party leaders.

The Democratic Party presidential candidate Andrew Yang and his supporters were critical of MSNBC's coverage of his campaign and the speaking time allocated to Yang at a November 2019 primary debate hosted by MSNBC.

In December 2019, In These Times analyzed coverage of the 2020 Democratic Party presidential primary by MSNBC between August and September 2019. They said that "MSNBC talked about Biden twice as often as Warren and three times as often as Sanders", and that Sanders was the candidate spoken of negatively the most frequently of the three."

Chris Matthews compared Sanders to George McGovern in terms of electability on February 3 and criticized Sanders for adopting the "democratic socialist" label on February 7. In reference to Sanders' praise of some aspects of Fidel Castro's Cuba, Matthews said on air during Hardball, "I believe if Castro and the Reds had won the Cold War there would have been executions in Central Park, and I might have been one of the ones executed". He then questioned what Sanders meant when he used the term 'socialism'. The following week, Chuck Todd criticized the rhetoric of Sanders supporters by quoting a conservative article which compared them to Nazi brown shirts. Commenting on the 2020 Nevada Democratic caucuses, Matthews invoked "the fall of France" to the Nazis in 1940 as a metaphor for Sanders' apparent victory in the state. These analogies were criticized by the Sanders campaign and other commentators, who noted that members of Sanders' family had been murdered in the Holocaust. Matthews later issued an on-air apology to Sanders and his supporters. On March 2, 2020, Matthews announced that he would depart MSNBC effective immediately.

Jason Johnson, an MSNBC contributor, was temporarily suspended in February 2020 after backlash over his accusing Bernie Sanders supporters of alienating minorities and saying of African-American Sanders staffers and surrogates, "I don't care how many people from the island of misfit black girls that you throw out to defend you on a regular basis." He was reinstated in July 2020.

=== Coverage of Israeli–Palestinian conflict ===
Ayman Mohyeldin has been alleged to have an anti-Israel bias in his reporting. In 2015, Mohyeldin was reporting live from Gaza, where he claimed to have witnessed an unarmed Palestinian man being shot by Israeli police at the Damascus Gate; the man turned out to be wielding a large knife.

Following the outbreak of the Gaza war, it was reported by Semafor that a number of Muslim hosts (including Mehdi Hasan, Mohyeldin, and Ali Velshi) were sidelined from coverage.

== Suspensions and dismissals of hosts ==
=== Michael Savage ===
Michael Savage briefly hosted a weekend talk show in 2003. That July, Savage responded to a prank caller on his show by calling him a "pig" and a "sodomite", and telling him he "should get AIDS and die". Savage's show was canceled and he was dismissed from MSNBC shortly thereafter.

=== Don Imus ===
Don Imus' radio show Imus in the Morning was simulcast on MSNBC for over ten years. In 2007, he described members of the Rutgers Scarlet Knights women's basketball team as "some nappy-headed hoes". The remark sparked outrage, as many considered it to be racist and sexist. After sponsors began to withdraw advertisements from the show, MSNBC canceled the simulcast. Both Imus and NBC News apologized to the Rutgers Basketball team for the remarks.

=== Brief suspension of Joe Scarborough due to political contributions ===
In November 2010, Joe Scarborough, host of Morning Joe, was briefly suspended after he donated $4,000 to Republican candidates in Florida.

=== Suspension and departure of Keith Olbermann ===
In November 2010, Keith Olbermann, the host of the highly rated news/opinion show Countdown with Keith Olbermann, was suspended without pay for having contributed $2,400 (the maximum personal donation limit) to each of three Democratic Party candidates ahead of the 2010 United States elections. NBC News policy prohibited contributions to political campaigns unless NBC News had given its prior permission. A few days later, he was reinstated.

In January 2011, Olbermann left MSNBC. Before reading a James Thurber short story called "The Scottie Who Knew Too Much", Olbermann thanked viewers, producers, and technical staff for his show's eight-year success. However, he did not thank or even mention Griffin or NBC News president Steve Capus. Olbermann did not disclose the reason for his departure, and a statement from MSNBC would only reveal that the two parties had ended the commentator's four-year contract. Many liberal bloggers and commentators blamed cable provider Comcast for Olbermann's sudden departure, accusing the company of silencing the host for political purposes just days after acquiring NBCUniversal on January 18. Statements from MSNBC and Comcast denied this allegation. Daily Beast media critic Howard Kurtz, former MSNBC anchor David Shuster, and an anonymous NBC executive said that Olbermann's past suspension and subsequent conflicts with network management was a more likely precipitating factor in Countdown's cancellation.

The following month, Olbermann relaunched his show on Current TV. He also started a blog called FOKNewsChannel.com, a commentary site parodying Fox News, which included written commentaries and articles based on former Countdown segments.

=== Martin Bashir ===
In November 2013, Martin Bashir criticized Sarah Palin for equating the federal debt to slavery, leading to his resignation. Bashir referred to the cruel and barbaric punishment of slaves as described by slave overseer Thomas Thistlewood, specifically a punishment called "Derby's dose", which forced slaves to defecate or urinate into the mouth of another slave. Bashir then said, "When Mrs. Palin invokes slavery, she doesn't just prove her rank ignorance. She confirms if anyone truly qualified for a dose of discipline from Thomas Thistlewood, she would be the outstanding candidate."

=== Alec Baldwin ===
Alec Baldwin's 2013 show Up Late with Alec Baldwin was suspended after five episodes because of a homophobic slur Baldwin made to a photographer in New York City.

== Racism allegations ==
In May 2014, during the show "Way Too Early", a segment was done about the historical background of Cinco De Mayo and featured Louis Burgdorf dancing around the set in a sombrero, shaking maracas and drinking tequila, which host Thomas Roberts referred to as "go-go juice". The segment was criticized for its mocking of Mexican heritage and use of false stereotypes. MSNBC apologized the next day, saying there was no intention to be disrespectful and that while the props were planned, Roberts and Burgdorf acted the way they did on their own. The two hosts also apologized, although they partially deflected the blame back at their producers for allowing the segment.

In January 2020, as MSNBC reported on the death of Kobe Bryant, Alison Morris quickly called Bryant's former team, the Los Angeles Lakers, what sounded like "the Los Angeles Niggers", immediately self-correcting to "Los Angeles Lakers". Morris claimed to have verbally stumbled and said "Los Angeles Nakers", claiming she had stuttered, combining the words "Knicks" and "Lakers" into "Nakers", rather than the racial slur. Many people accused her of being racist, which Morris quickly denied. A petition to have Morris fired was signed by over 184,000 people.

== Notable personnel ==
=== Anchors and hosts ===
- Jacqueline Alemany – Co–host of The Weekend morning edition
- Peter Alexander – Anchor of MS NOW's 11 a.m. weekday program and chief national reporter (2026–present)
- Mika Brzezinski – Morning Joe co-host (2007–present)
- Jonathan Capehart – Co–host of The Weekend morning edition
- Eugene Daniels – Co–host of The Weekend morning edition
- Willie Geist – Sunday Today anchor (2016–present), Morning Joe co-host (2007–present) and NBC News correspondent (2005–present)
- Chris Hayes – Host of All in with Chris Hayes (2013–present) on MS NOW (2010–present)
- Antonia Hylton – The Weekend: Primetime co–host (2025–present), correspondent (2020–present)
- Elise Jordan – The Weekend: Primetime co–host
- Jonathan Lemire – Morning Joe co-host (2025–present) and political analyst (2017–present)
- Rachel Maddow – The Rachel Maddow Show host (2008–present) and MS NOW senior political analyst (2005–present)
- Ari Melber – Host of The Beat with Ari Melber (2017–present) and chief legal correspondent (2015–present)
- Alicia Menendez – Host of On the Line with Alicia Menendez (2026–present)
- Ayman Mohyeldin – The Weekend: Primetime co-host (2001–2002, 2011–present)
- Lawrence O'Donnell – Host of The Last Word on MS NOW (1996–1999, 2010–present)
- Jen Psaki – Host of The Briefing with Jen Psaki (2023–present) on MS NOW (2022–present)
- Catherine Rampell – The Weekend Primetime co–host (2025–present)
- Stephanie Ruhle – Host of The 11th Hour (2022–present), senior business analyst (2016–present)
- Luke Russert – The Weeknight co-host (2026–present) and director of creative services (2023–present)
- Symone Sanders-Townsend – The Weeknight co-host (2024–present), political analyst (2022–present)
- Joe Scarborough – Morning Joe co-host (2007–present) & MS NOW senior political analyst (2003–present)
- Al Sharpton – Host of PoliticsNation and Morning Joe contributor (2011–present)
- Jacob Soboroff – Host of Connect with Jacob Soboroff (2026–present)
- Michael Steele – The Weeknight co-host (2024–present) and MS NOW political analyst (2011–present)
- Katy Tur – Host of The Moment with Katy Tur (2026–present)
- Ali Velshi – Host of The 11th Hour (2026-present), correspondent (2016–present)
- Ali Vitali – Anchor of Way Too Early (2025–present), Congressional correspondent (2010–present)
- Nicolle Wallace – Deadline: White House host (2017–present), MS NOW senior political analyst (2015–present)
- Alex Witt – Alex Witt Reports anchor (1999–2026)

=== American-based correspondents and reporters ===
- Ken Dilanian – Justice and Intelligence correspondent (2015–present)
- Vaughn Hillyard – White House correspondent (2013–present)
- Chris Jansing – Chief political correspondent (1998–present)
- Carol Leonnig – Senior investigative correspondent (2025–present)
- David Rohde – Senior national security reporter (2023–present)
- Jacob Soboroff – Senior national and political correspondent (2015–present)
- Brandy Zadrozny – Senior enterprise reporter (2018–present)

=== Contributors and analysts ===
- Peter Baker – political analyst
- Mike Barnicle – Morning Joe contributor (2007–present)
- Cornell Belcher – political analyst
- John Heilemann – national affairs analyst
- David Ignatius – Morning Joe analyst
- Jason Johnson – political contributor
- Molly Jong-Fast – political analyst
- Neal Katyal – legal analyst
- Katty Kay – Morning Joe contributor
- Barry McCaffrey – military analyst
- Mary B. McCord – legal and national security contributor
- Barbara McQuade – legal analyst
- Jon Meacham – presidential historian
- Tim Miller – political analyst
- Melissa Murray – legal analyst
- Michele Norris – senior contributing editor and analyst
- Ashley Parker – senior political analyst
- Paola Ramos – contributor
- Steven Rattner – Morning Joe economic analyst
- Eugene Robinson – chief political analyst
- Andrew Ross Sorkin – contributor and analyst
- Al Sharpton – Morning Joe contributor and host of PoliticsNation (2011–present)
- Bret Stephens – Senior political contributor
- Charlie Sykes – columnist and contributor
- Joyce Vance – legal analyst
- Alex Wagner – Senior political analyst (2011–2015; 2022–present)
- Andrew Weissmann – legal analyst

== See also ==
- List of programs broadcast by MS NOW
- MS NOW Reports
- MS NOW Films
