= Carl Diggler =

Fictional American journalist

- Carl Diggler's Twitter avatar. Diggler superimposed a Santa Claus hat onto his photo during the 2015 Christmas season and was unable to change it back because of his technological ineptitude.
- First appearance: October 13, 2015
- Created by: Blake Zeff, Felix Biederman, Virgil Texas
- Voiced by: Felix Biederman

In-universe information
- Full name: Carl Allison Diggler
- Nickname: "The Dig"
- Occupation: Pundit; journalist
- Spouse: An ex-wife, referred to as "Ex-Mrs. The Dig"
- Significant other: On-again, off-again relationship with "KweenTrashWytch✨✨"
- Children: Colby

Carl "The Dig" Allison Diggler is a fictional American journalist. Introduced in 2015, the character was created by Blake Zeff and mostly written by Felix Biederman and Virgil Texas for CAFE, an online publisher of political news and satire, in the run-up to the 2016 United States presidential election.

Diggler, a middle-aged, centrist pundit who prides himself on his "inside the Beltway" knowledge of the Washington, D.C. political scene, is the purported author of a column published at CAFE and a keen, if clueless, Twitter user. Portrayed as a smug, ignorant blowhard, the character hero-worships the bombast and theatre of American politics with little concern for its consequences. His writing frequently exposes details of his failed marriage and protracted family court proceedings for custody of his son Colby. Texas described the target of the character as "ridiculous" pundits. During 2016 Diggler also hosted The DigCast, a podcast featuring weekly guests, with Biederman giving voice to Diggler and Texas playing Diggler's millennial intern. Biederman also established the Chapo Trap House podcast in 2016, which Texas has co-hosted.

Writing as Diggler, Biederman and Texas began using their intuition to guess the outcomes of primary contests in the election. By the end of the primary season, Diggler claimed to have correctly predicted more winners than data journalist Nate Silver's FiveThirtyEight blog. Texas ran an op-ed in The Washington Post about their predictive success and the ways Diggler exposed the flaws of supposedly objective data-journalistic techniques.

== Authorship ==
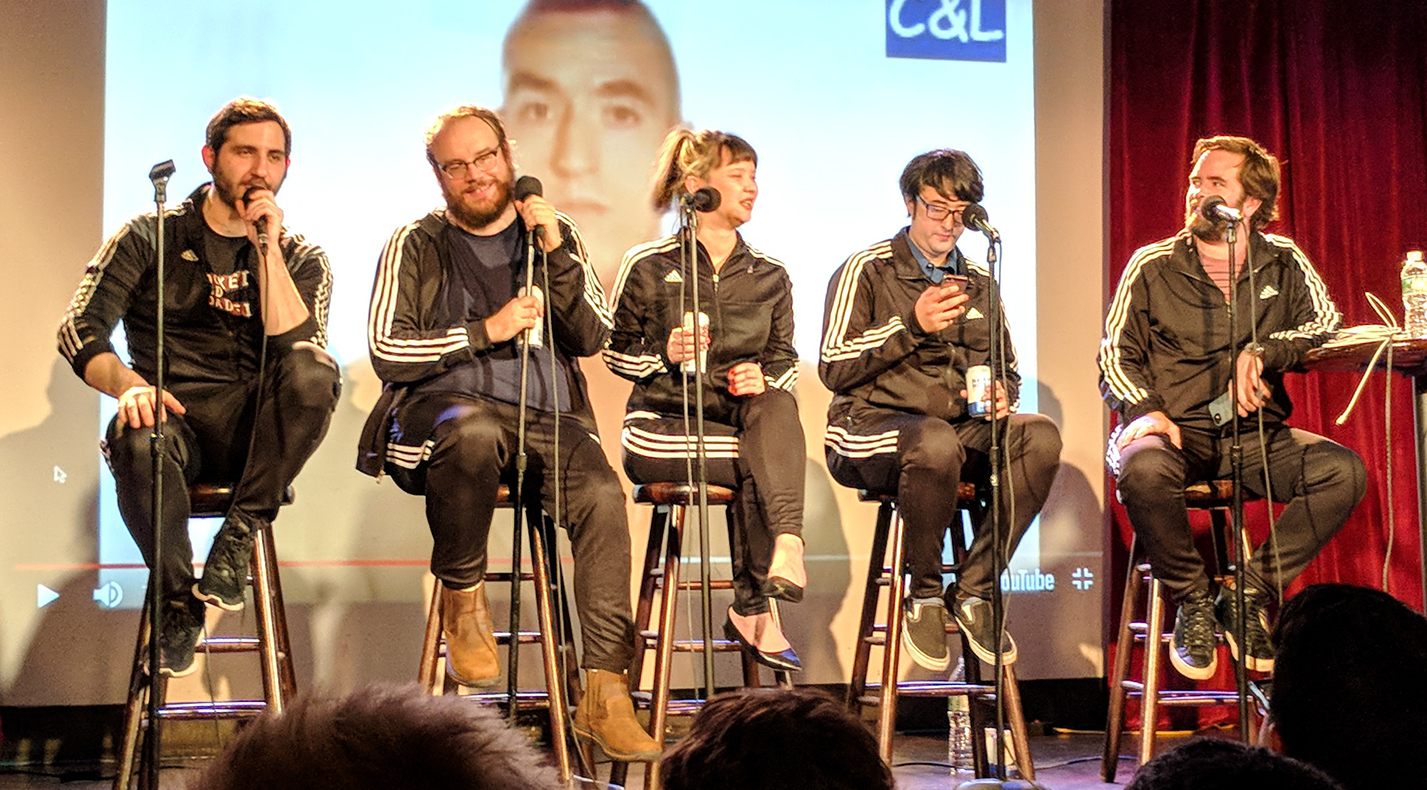
Felix Biederman (left) and Virgil Texas (second from right) in 2017

Cafe editor-in-chief Blake Zeff came up with the original idea for Carl Diggler, and hired Biederman and Texas to develop the character and write his columns. Biederman was then a freelance writer on various topics, and Texas was a former contributor to The Onion; both were popular Twitter personalities. Zeff contributed ideas, edits the columns, and helped to run Carl Diggler's in-character Twitter account, but the articles and social media posts by the character were largely the work of Biederman and Texas.

In addition to tweeting in-character as Diggler, Biederman and Texas typically wrote one to four Diggler columns a week. Splitsider writer Eddie Brawley said Texas has "the more polished, literary style" and a skill for tonal imitation of writers like Hunter S. Thompson when the occasion calls, while Biederman possesses a "preternatural ability to observe and exploit the tiny absurdities of online behavior."

Biederman and Texas had semi-fictional counterparts under their own names as Diggler's interns. They occasionally broke the fourth wall in the column to write articles as themselves when they were, in real life, on-location covering political events on the 2016 campaign trail—under the fictional pretext that Diggler, meanwhile, is stuck moping back in his Park Slope apartment.

== Character ==
=== Sources and targets of parody ===
Diggler is a satirical parody of the American political pundit class. Diggler has worked in national political journalism for thirty years, starting as chief political editor at the Minnetonka Bugle, and is the author of the book Think-ocracy: The Rise Of The Brainy Congressman. Most Diggler articles begin with a credo reminding readers that Diggler uses "gut, conventional wisdom and personal experience" when analyzing politics. Texas offered this summation of Diggler's persona and satiric purpose:

Carl exists to satirize all that is vacuous, elitist and ridiculous about the media class. From his sycophantic love of candidates in uniform to his hatred of Bernie Bros, from his reverence for "the discourse" to his constant threats of suing the people who troll him on Twitter, Carl is predicated on being myopic, vain and — frankly — wrong.

Biederman said Diggler "grew out of the craven inanity and absurd self-importance you see in the worst 'wonks' and horserace pundits, but we exaggerated it to make him as much of a clown as we personally saw these people." Diggler writes with adoration for the ceremonial decorum of American politics, but blithe, often oblivious disregard for the plight faced by real voters.

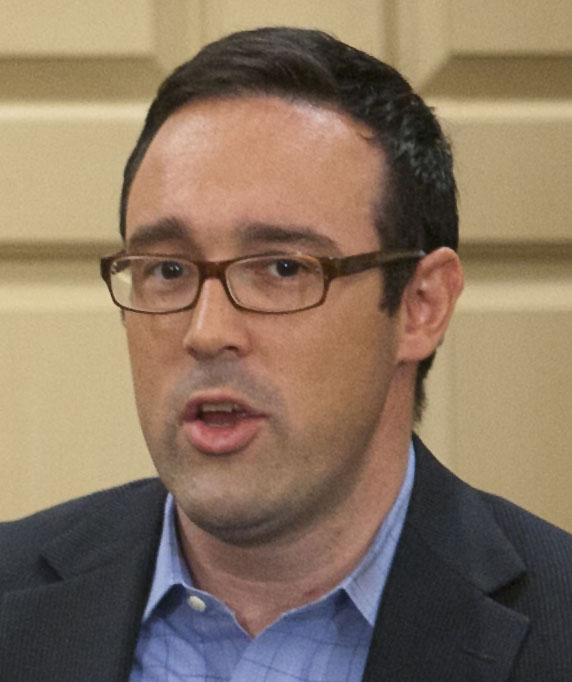
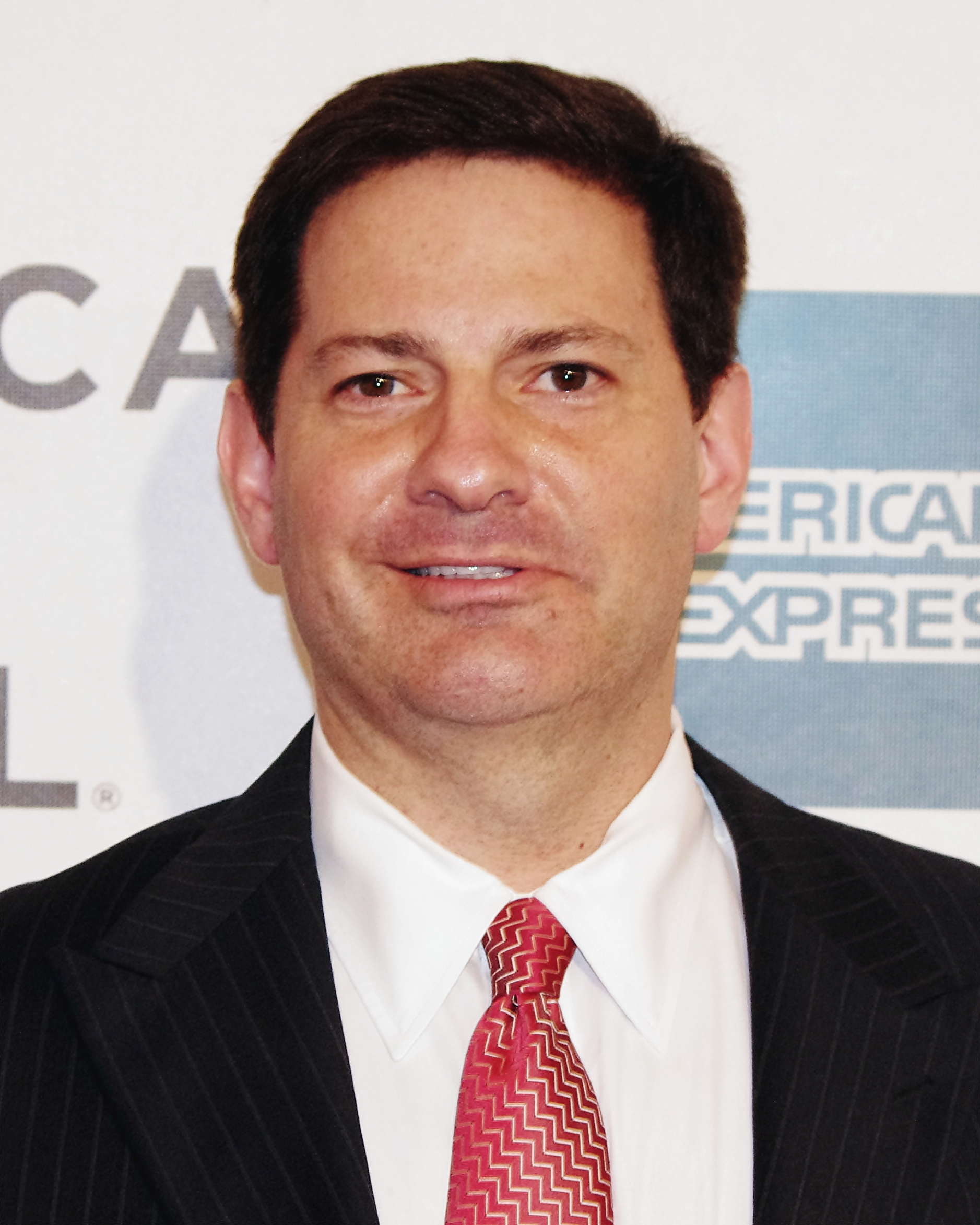

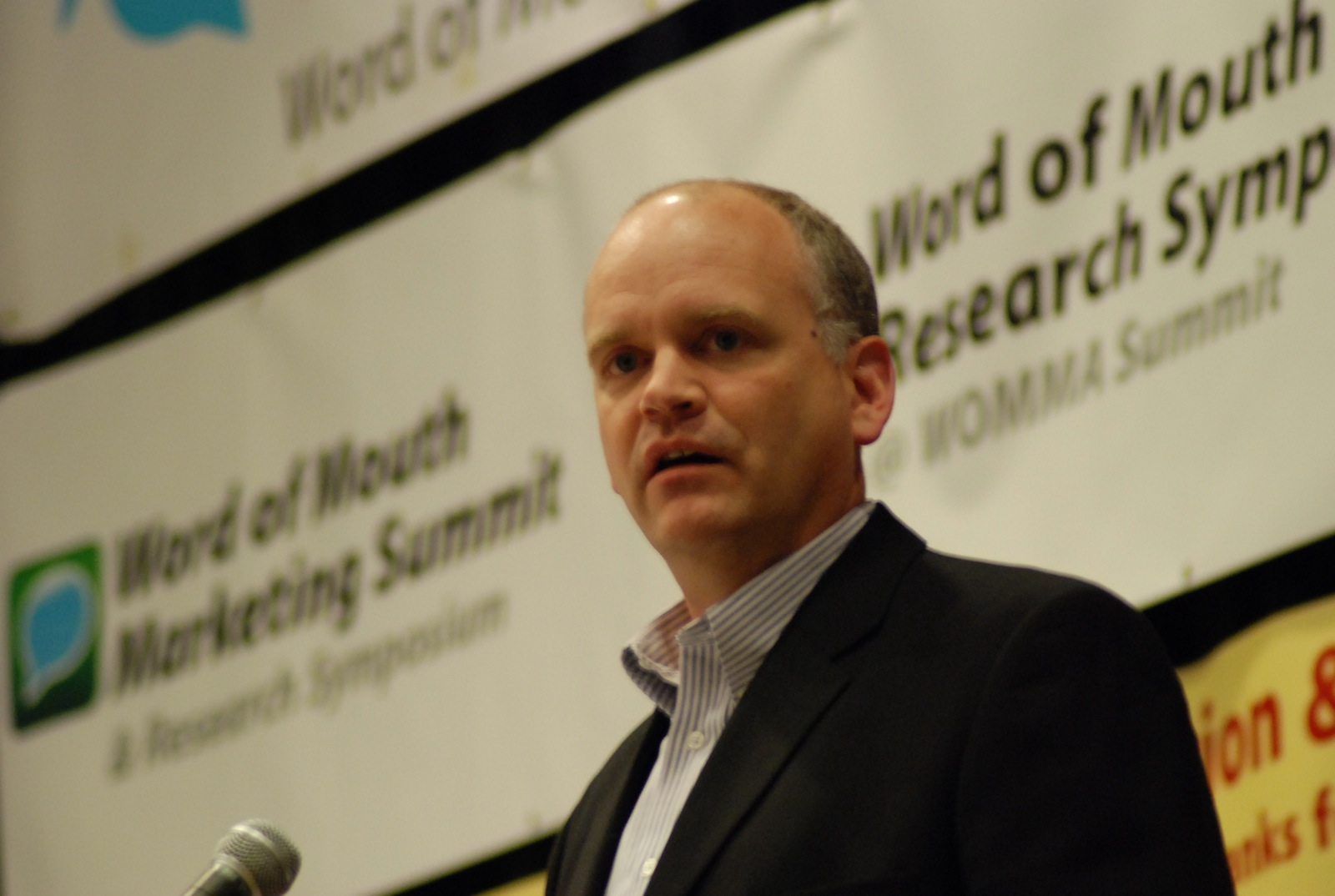
The three most significant sources of inspiration for Diggler were Chris Cillizza (pictured in 2012), Mark Halperin (in 2012), and Ron Fournier (in 2006). Fournier, the primary inspiration for Diggler, was briefly duped into interacting with Diggler on Twitter as though Diggler were a real pundit.

Diggler's persona and political outlook are drawn from specific real-life journalists. In an episode of the podcast Chapo Trap House, Biederman and Texas listed Digger's biggest influences as Chris Cillizza, Mark Halperin, and above all, "greatest hack of all time" Ron Fournier. Cillizza wrote for the Washington Post blog The Fix, and his tone and tendency to refer to his wife as Mrs. Fix and his son as Fix Jr. were borrowed for Diggler. From Halperin, author of campaign books Game Change and Double Down: Game Change 2012, Diggler received his desire to ingratiate himself with politicians and to make himself the focus of attention. Fournier, the most significant source for Diggler, covered Bill Clinton's career as governor of Arkansas and worked at the Associated Press D.C. bureau during Clinton's presidency. In Biederman and Texas's view, Fournier gave Diggler journalistic credulousness and centrist belief that both sides of any issue are at fault. Biederman and Texas also cited columnists David Brooks and Richard Cohen for "bullshitting most of the time" but with an "unearned tone of authority."

Diggler's resemblance to specific journalists has been spotted by other writers: for instance, Silver has been described as "the natural O'Reilly to Diggler's Colbert," while Fournier was once called "the real life Carl Diggler". When a Niall Ferguson article compared the prospect of Brexit to his divorce, Jeet Heer compared Ferguson's writing to Diggler's "habit of linking every public event with his failed marriage." Because of the continuous, online, interactive, and source material recycling nature of Diggler, the character has been described as a work of metafiction. Through Twitter, Diggler has been mistaken for a real person by journalists and even presidential candidate Jim Webb, who retweeted Diggler's over-the-top, sarcastic endorsement. Journalists who Diggler has duped include Abby Huntsman (then co-host of The Cycle on MSNBC), Jill Filipovic (a writer whose work appears in Cosmopolitan), and even Diggler's chief inspiration Fournier.

=== Diggler's personal life ===
Mediaite's Sam Reisman described Diggler's personal life as a "richly detailed canon" and a "batshit American picaresque." Diggler is an unhappily divorced father of a "round son," Colby, over whom he is locked in a never-ending custody battle with his ex-wife, only called Ex-Mrs. The Dig. The custody battle has caused Diggler to resent the family court system, and he constantly invokes his concerns about family court in his column and even incorporates them into his political thought in contrived ways. It is also often implied that Diggler is a sex addict, with the character unwittingly making references to his foot fetish and interest in sex tourism and camgirls. In search of love, Diggler briefly dates a feminist NYU student referred to by her Tumblr handle, KweenTrashWytch✨✨ (including the two sparkle emoji). During his period of dating KweenTrashWytch✨✨, Diggler became "woke" and, claiming to follow his newfound understanding of intersectional feminism, endorsed Carly Fiorina in an attempt to impress his girlfriend.

After a bad breakup sparked by KweenTrashWytch✨✨ destroying his posters of Senator Lindsey Graham, Diggler disappeared from the website. He later emerged as the subject of a hostage video, after being captured in Syria by Assad loyalists and then turned over to the Russian government. However, he was able to return to America after the Russians decided he wasn't worth keeping around and put him on a plane to New York.

Diggler's life took a turn for the worse when his horribly-mistaken predictions for the 2016 US Presidential Election led to Cafe replacing him with Diggler superfan David "The Milk" Milkberg as their "Chief Politics Writer" at the site. On top of that, Diggler was evicted from his studio apartment and lost partial custody of Colby. Diggler has partially recovered by writing independent political analysis pieces and posting them on Medium, but his efforts to crowdfund his future journalism work have been hamstrung after he previously used crowdfunding sites to donate to Russian camgirls he met online and accidentally "donated several thousands of dollars to Hamas."

== 2016 presidential primary predictions ==
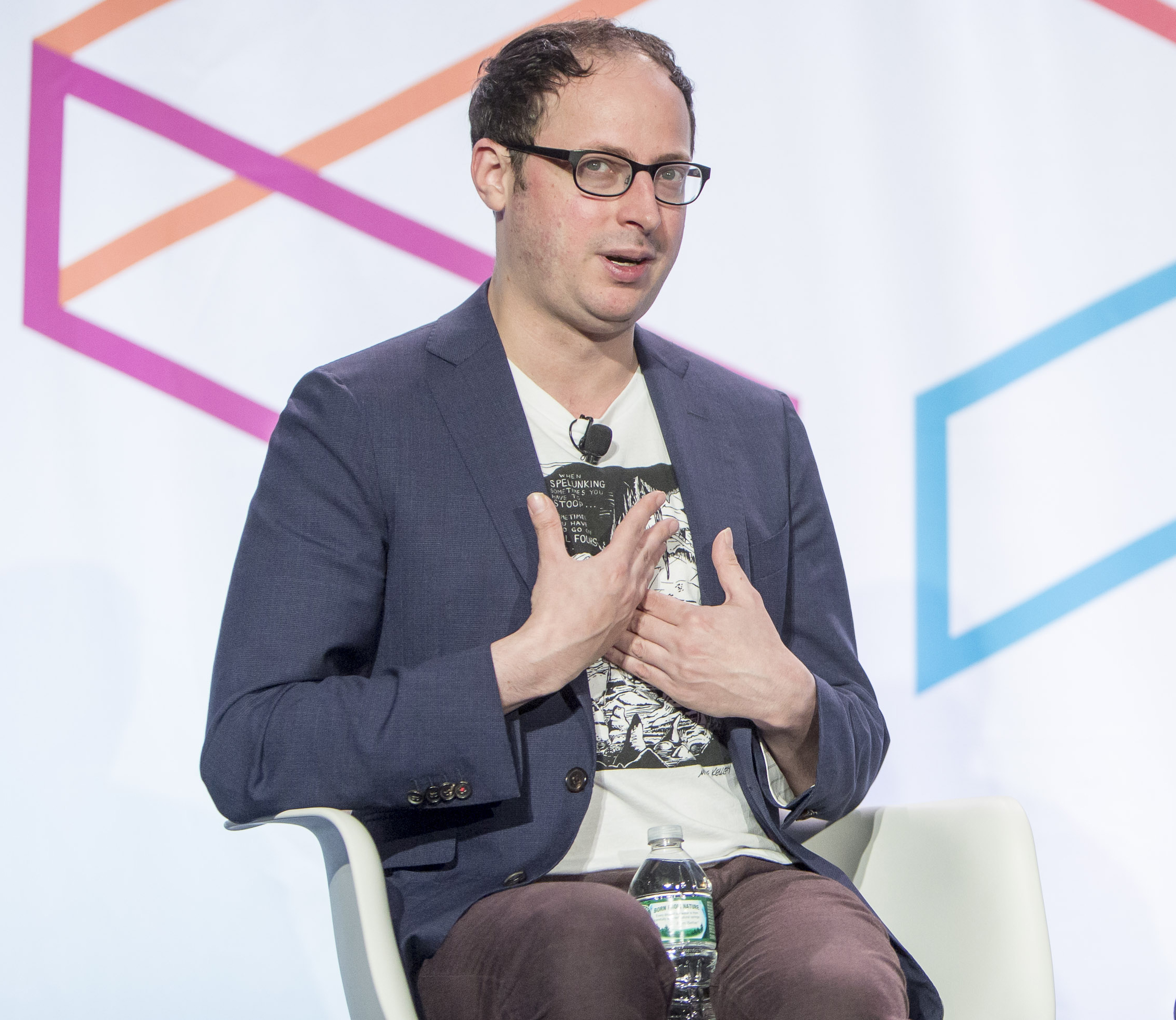
Diggler challenged Nate Silver (pictured in 2015), the editor-in-chief of FiveThirtyEight, in the prediction of 2016 presidential primary contests.

Following the practice of many other political journalists and news publications, Diggler published predictions for who would win each contest of the 2016 presidential primary season. Diggler's predictions were actually made by Biederman and Texas, without reliance on data or traditional analysis. Diggler backed up his picks with absurd, often grotesque rationales, based on the character's "gut" reading of a state electorate's supposed tendencies and mindsets. Biederman said the predictions were made based on "personal hate of a candidate, the broad prejudices of their voters, anecdotal experience, and sexual pathology." In an in-character interview with Complex, Diggler himself attributed his predictive success to "two variables: gut and experience."

In a surprise to observers, as well as to Biederman and Texas themselves, Diggler's predictions proved to be highly accurate, and even seemed to match or outperform rigorous, statistical predictive models used by other publications. Most conspicuously, Diggler correctly predicted more primary outcomes than the models used by Nate Silver's FiveThirtyEight, a prominent data journalism and statistics blog owned by ESPN.

After his predicting streak became apparent, Diggler gloated to Silver on Twitter and in his column, even challenging Silver to a head-to-head contest. Cafe launched "SixThirtyEight," a tally of Diggler's predictive wins over FiveThirtyEight. According to the "SixThirtyEight" tally, Diggler predicted with 89% accuracy, calling 81 of 91 total contests comprising the primaries for both major parties in every state and United States territory. By contrast, FiveThirtyEight had a 56% success rate in the total 91 contests. FiveThirtyEight had chosen not to make predictions in some contests, all of which Diggler counted as forfeits. The FiveThirtyEight predictive model left contests without a prediction if there was too little data to make a prediction or if the race was too close to call (for example, FiveThirtyEight did not make a prediction in the Alaska primaries), while Diggler made a prediction in every race (including small contests like the Guam primaries). Diggler predicted many more total winners, but if FiveThirtyEight's non-predictions are ignored rather than counted as forfeits, then Diggler and FiveThirtyEight still had a roughly equal rate of success.

Following the attention given to Diggler's results, Texas wrote an op-ed in The Washington Post explaining the Diggler character, their methodology, and what he believed Diggler's results revealed about the flaws of purportedly objective, detached journalism. In the editorial, Texas said that Silver's predictions were, despite their reliance on data, not falsifiable and thus unscientific, and that they overstated the statistical impact of factors like endorsements based on subjective assumptions about historical elections. Texas wrote that readers of data journalism—such as voters, other journalists, and members of the political establishment—rely on quasi-scientific predictions and analysis when making political decisions, in ways that adversely shapes the real outcomes:

If the quants had not ignored Trump's soaring popularity all last year, perhaps the GOP establishment would not have sat on their hands as he waltzed to the nomination. And if the same pundits had not been writing Sanders's obituary before any votes were cast, perhaps that race would be even closer. Maybe a more subjective form of analysis, such as going out and listening to voters, would have understood their passions better than the data journalists' models.

In interviews, Biederman said that they do believe there is a place for data journalism, but that its prominent practitioners had relied on outdated theories of how elections work and failed to account for the unprecedented anger of voters in an ahistorical election.

== The DigCast ==
Diggler is voiced by Biederman, who increases the pitch of his ordinarily deep voice and adopts an accent similar to The Simpsons character Ned Flanders. Either Biederman and Texas speaking about Diggler, or Biederman playing Diggler, appeared on multiple podcasts prior to getting their own show, including District Sentinel Radio, Reply All, Chapo Trap House, and a live taping of The Katie Halper Show on WBAI. Biederman and Texas launched The DigCast on July 1, 2016, with Biederman voicing Diggler and Texas playing his intern. Guests have included former Gawker editor Alex Pareene, comedian Brandon Wardell, Braddock, Pennsylvania Mayor John Fetterman, writer and MSNBC host Steve Kornacki, and The Intercept editor Glenn Greenwald. Biederman tweeted on February 25, 2017 that The Digcast had ended. Episodes can be streamed from SoundCloud or iTunes.

=== Episodes ===
No.	Title	Original release date
1	"Alex Pareene"	July 1, 2016
2	"Jon Lovett"	July 8, 2016
3	Brandon Wardell	July 15, 2016
4	"Philip Bump/RNC"	July 22, 2016
5	"PFT Commenter"	August 5, 2016
6	"John Fetterman"	August 12, 2016
7	"Steve Kornacki"	August 18, 2016
8	"Felix Gets Banned"	August 26, 2016
9	"Glenn Greenwald"	September 2, 2016
10	"Brian Gaar"	September 9, 2016
11	"Dave Anthony"	September 23, 2016
12	"Digcast Live with Sam Kriss"	September 30, 2016
13	"Jello Biafra"	October 7, 2016
14	"Alexandra Petri"	October 14, 2016
15	"Third Presidential Debate Recap"	October 21, 2016

== Reception ==
According to Eddie Brawley, Diggler's writing has a niche appeal, because understanding the column's many elaborate in-joke references requires a reader to closely follow media discourse on Twitter and the character's own idiosyncrasies and intricate storylines. Diggler's audience and social media following include many "hip" establishment media figures who are "in on the joke." Biederman said he had seen positive feedback to Diggler from people with a wide variety of political identifications.

Diggler's primary predictions have generally received a positive response. Corinne Grinapol wrote in the blog FishbowlDC that "Diggler exists in opposition to objective analysis, but is also a reminder that the idea of objective analysis is an often-impossible ideal disguised as an attainable one. Diggler's biases are not the only ones worth being aware of." In National Review, Theodore Kupfer cited Diggler's predictions and Texas' op-ed as prescient, in contrast to Silver and other pundits who had been blindsided by the unexpected rise of Donald Trump. However, Washington Post blogger Callum Borchers dismissed the SixThirtyEight project as misleading, believing Biederman and Texas inflated the appearance of Diggler's success, and urged readers to "not be silly and pretend like [Diggler]'s some kind of proof that data journalism and poll-based prognostication is B.S.; he isn't more accurate than Nate Silver."

In 2018, Yale University's humor magazine The Yale Record resurrected its "Humorist of the Year Award" and gave it to Biederman and Texas, in recognition of their work on Diggler and Chapo Trap House.

== See also ==
- Chapo Trap House, a podcast that features Felix Biederman and Virgil Texas as hosts
