= Ari Melber =

American television journalist (born 1980)

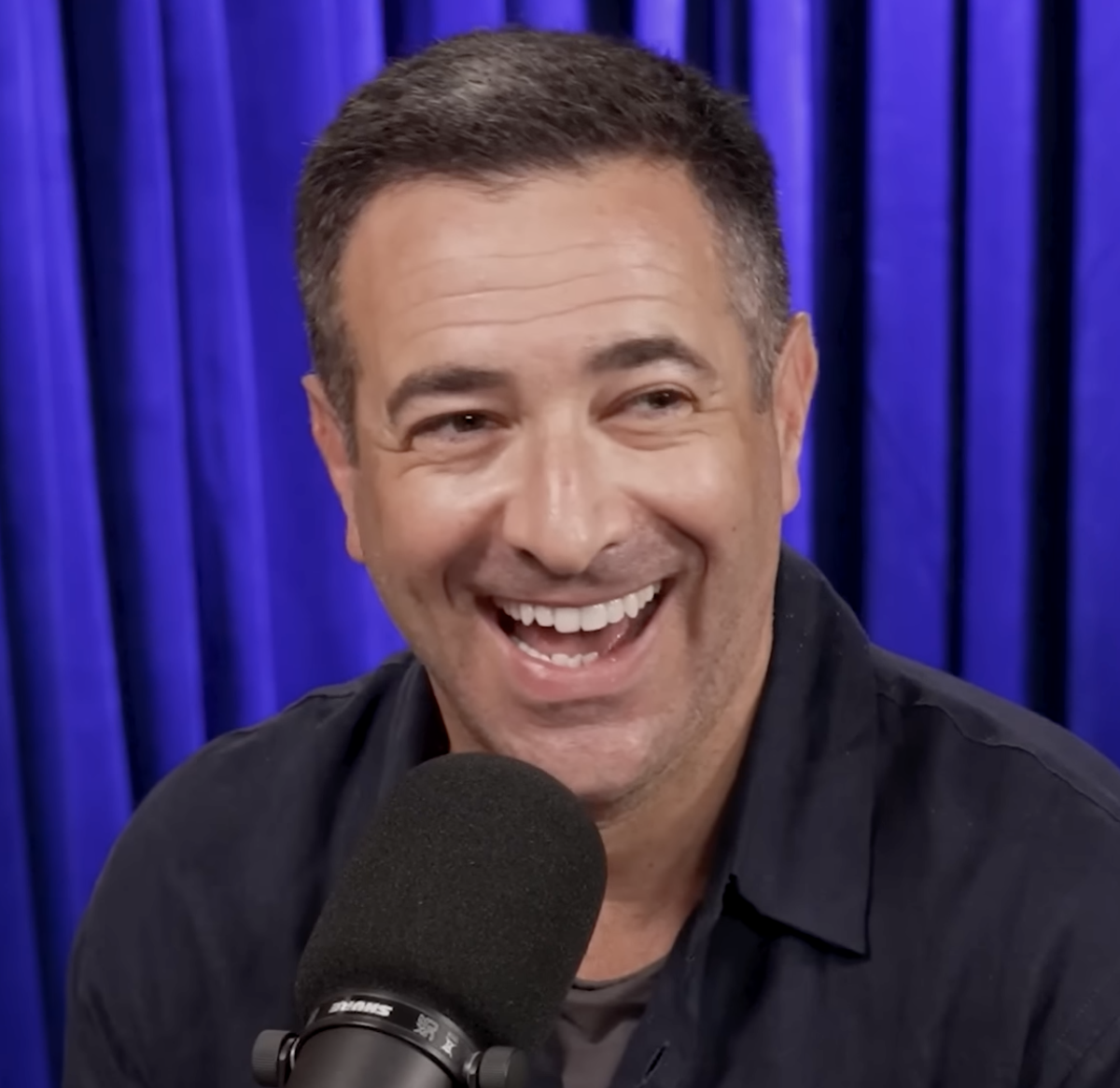
- Melber in 2025
- Born: Ari Naftali Melber; March 31, 1980 (age 46); Seattle, Washington, U.S.
- Education: University of Michigan (AB); Cornell University (JD)
- Occupation: Journalist
- Employer: Versant
- Television: Today Show (legal analyst); NBC News (legal analyst); All in with Chris Hayes; The Rachel Maddow Show; The Last Word with Lawrence O'Donnell; The Beat with Ari Melber
- Spouse: Drew Grant (m. 2013; div. 2017)

Ari Naftali Melber (born March 31, 1980) is an American attorney and journalist who is chief legal correspondent at MS NOW and host of The Beat with Ari Melber.

Melber won a 2016 Emmy Award for Supreme Court reporting and was nominated for Emmy Awards in 2020 and 2025 in the "Outstanding Live Interview" category.

== Early life and education ==
Melber is Jewish, the son of an Israeli immigrant. His grandparents were Holocaust survivors.

Melber attended Garfield High School in Seattle, Washington. He then attended the University of Michigan, where he graduated with an A.B. in political science in 2002. After college, he moved to Washington, D.C., and worked for Senator Maria Cantwell. He then joined Senator John Kerry's presidential campaign, working the Iowa caucus and as California deputy political director. When Kerry lost, Melber attended Cornell Law School, where he was an editor of the Cornell Journal of Law and Public Policy and graduated with a J.D. in 2009. He interned at New York County Defender Services, a public defender's office.

Melber worked for First Amendment lawyer Floyd Abrams at Cahill Gordon & Reindel from 2009 to 2013. He also began writing for news outlets like The Nation, The Atlantic, Reuters, and Politico. MSNBC asked him to serve as a guest host. In April 2015, Melber was named the network's chief legal correspondent.

== Media career ==
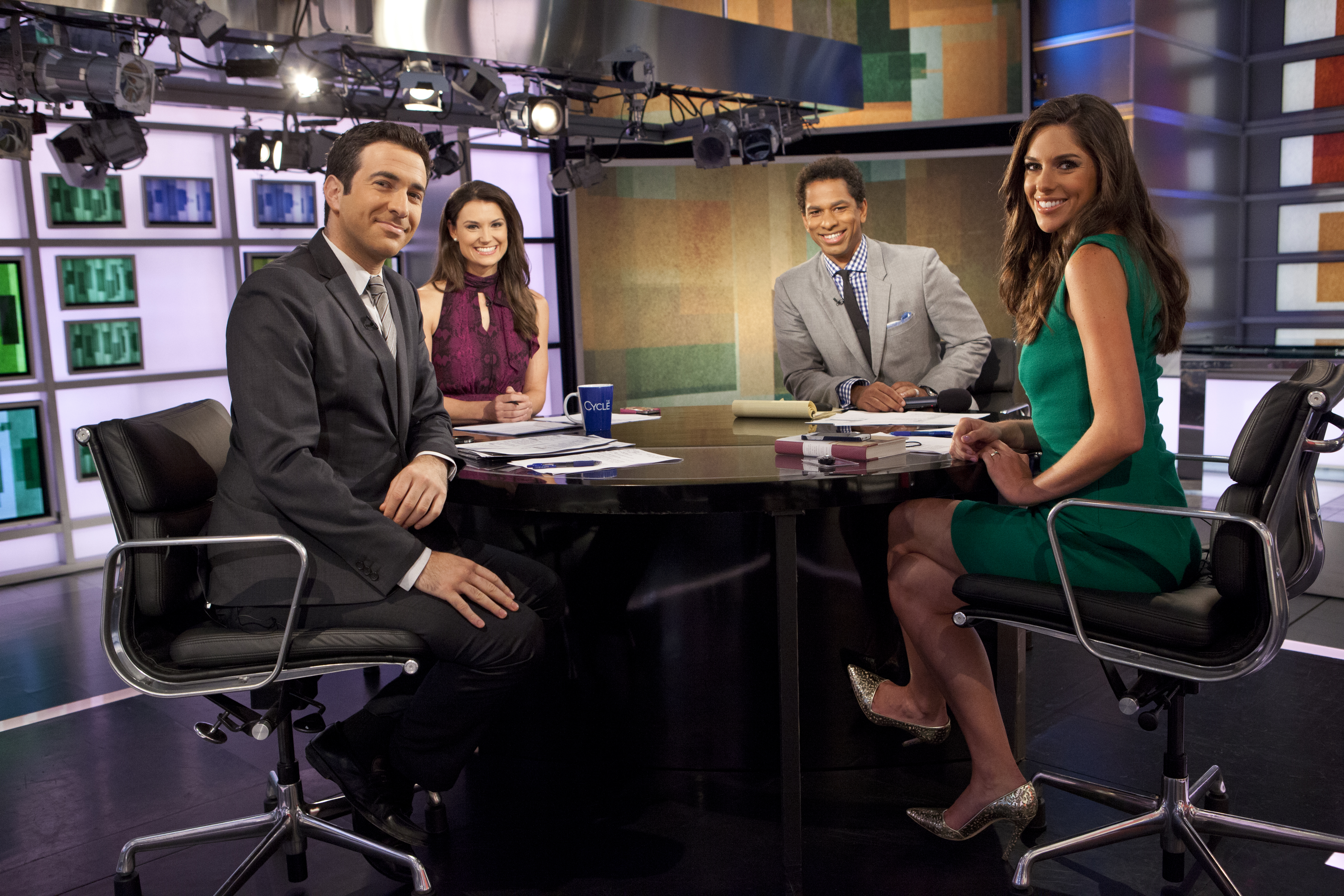
The Cycle: Ari Melber, Krystal Ball, Touré, and Abby Huntsman (2013)

=== 2013–2015 ===
In April 2013, Melber was named a co-host of "The Cycle" with S.E. Cupp, Krystal Ball, Touré, and Steve Kornacki. "The Cycle" was canceled in July 2015, and Melber continued working for the network as chief legal correspondent. Melber was a substitute host on The Rachel Maddow Show.

=== 2015–2018 ===
Melber is a legal analyst at NBC News as well as MSNBC's chief legal correspondent, covering the Department of Justice, the FBI, and the Supreme Court.

He has won an Emmy Award for his Supreme Court coverage. In 2017, Melber hosted The Point on Sundays on MSNBC.

The Beat premiered on July 24, 2017, and became the "longest-running" show at "MSNBC's 6 p.m. hour in network history" in 2021.

Melber reported that the firing of FBI Director James Comey could trigger an investigation into obstruction of justice on May 9, 2017 — the day Comey was fired. A probe was announced on May 18, 2017, which included an obstruction investigation.

Melber reported that President Trump's actions toward Ukraine provided a potential case of impeachment for "bribery" in October 2019. The next month, top Democrats began making the bribery case, showing "Democrats agreed with the MSNBC host," and a Republican congressman cited a bribery segment from The Beat at an impeachment hearing.

Melber broke the story that a state investigator was exploring jurisdiction to charge potential defendants in the Mueller probe with state crimes, meaning a conviction would not be eligible for a federal pardon. Politico followed up on Melber's scoop the next day, and New York State prosecutors ultimately filed separate charges against Paul Manafort in 2019.

=== 2019 ===
Melber interviewed former Trump campaign manager Corey Lewandowski in February 2019 about whether Trump asked Lewandowski to interfere in the Mueller probe; Melber later reported that Lewandowski's response was false. In a 2019 congressional hearing, investigators aired the Beat clip and questioned Lewandowski about the answer.

Melber broke the story of police repeatedly tasing a Virginia man until he died in police custody, an investigative report that led to an FBI investigation of the officers' conduct.

On the night of the 2018 midterms, Melber broke a story that Democrats on the Ways and Means Committee "intend to request President Trump's tax returns." In April 2019, United States House Committee on Ways and Means Chairman Richard Neal carried out that plan.

The Beat with Ari Melber has featured newsworthy interviews, such as of Sheriff Joe Arpaio, who talked to Melber after receiving the first pardon of Trump's administration; Eric Holder, Kamala Harris, Trump attorneys Jay Sekulow, Drew Findling, and Joe Tacopina; White House aide Stephen Miller, Peter Navarro, Dave Chappelle, Robert De Niro, Meek Mill, Erykah Badu, Snoop Dogg, Ken Starr, and a range of witnesses in the Mueller probe, including Steve Bannon, whose Beat interview was his first-ever appearance on MSNBC.

Melber has drawn attention for his interviewing skills and was nominated for "Outstanding Live Interview" at the 41st News and Documentary Emmy Awards for interviewing four key witnesses in the Mueller probe at once.

Columbia Journalism Review stated Melber is "a remarkably effective interviewer", adding "his veins appear to contain ice water; he betrays no emotion at all" during intense exchanges. The A.P. reports "Melber is respected enough as a lawyer that some figures in Trump world, like Peter Navarro and lawyer Joe Tacopina, have appeared on The Beat to tell their stories."

The New York Times columnist Peter Wehner, a former Republican official, said, "Melber is an outstanding interviewer, among the best on television." Director Lee Daniels got emotional in a 2019 interview about his life and career with Melber, saying it was the only time he would ever "cry on television".

=== 2020 ===
In June 2020, conservative commentator Tiana Lowe wrote, "Ari Melber on MSNBC" runs a "good straight news hour."

Mediaite wrote The Beat is a "thought-provoking" and "idiosyncratic show" that "avoids the singular focus on Trump's misdeeds that consumes some other hosts", adding Melber's interviewing style uses "the facts of the story and logical reasoning, [not] partisan cheap shots" for "fascinating" exchanges.

Melber was nominated for a 2025 Emmy in the "Outstanding Live Interview" category, "for an interview with Trump aide Stephen Miller."

=== January 6 reporting ===
Melber conducted several newsworthy interviews with former Trump aide Peter Navarro, and one of the interviews was cited as evidence by Congress to hold Navarro in contempt, which led to his DOJ indictment and subsequent conviction.

Melber wrote a foreword to the HarperCollins edition of the January 6 Report, which became a #1 New York Times bestseller.

=== The Beat Streaming ===
"Melber’s reach goes well beyond the dwindling number of people who watch cable television," wrote the Los Angeles Times in a 2023 profile, reporting The Beat's YouTube ratings were higher "than any other personality‘s at the network." The Beat hit 1.5 billion total online views in 2024 and can average 700,000 views per day.

Semafor reported on the "enormous numbers," noting "on YouTube, The Beat just crossed 1.5 billion views, and averages over 500,000 views a clip — good engagement by any measure of YouTube success."

In 2024, The Ankler's Lachlan Cartwright reported "MSNBC has become the most-watched news network" on YouTube, "thanks to Ari Melber posting there regularly" along with videos by Rachel Maddow. The Beat has been credited as the "most streamed MSNBC show on YouTube", with some of the most-watched MSNBC segments online.

AdWeek asked Melber about the show's large YouTube audience, and he discussed the show's 1.6 billion views and why interviews with Bill Gates, 50 Cent, and Robert De Niro did well. ("The Internet likes quality, length and 'big' people or topics.") Melber's show is one of the most-viewed shows online (Daily Beast), and drawing over a billion streams is a "notable feat for a cable news program" (Reliable Sources).

=== Music and Culture ===
Melber regularly uses hip hop lyrics to explain political or legal scenarios. A Vanity Fair article about MSNBC dubbed him the "secret fourth Beastie Boy", writing he is "shockingly smart and well read."

SNL's Marcello Hernández played Melber in a cold-open skit, portraying several anchors during "MSNBC Special Coverage."

Apple Music launched a music show hosted by Melber, Nevuary Radio, in 2019.

In 2022, Melber did a special report on the song "God Did" by Jay-Z and DJ Khaled, with "acutely detailed dissection" of his verse, and Jay Z then released audio of Melber's report as a new Jay-Z track, "Hov Did," on streaming music platforms. Melber wrote an essay for the 2024 Jay Z book, "Book of HOV."

Meek Mill references The Beat in his music video "Mandela Freestyle," as does rapper Benny the Butcher in another song; Harlem rapper Dave East cites the show in the chorus of his song "Eyes Can See."

Melber was a correspondent for The Nation, and he has been published in The Atlantic, Reuters, and Politico and in several books; he also wrote a report about Organizing for America.

== Personal life ==
Melber lives in Prospect Heights, Brooklyn. He has been divorced from Drew Grant, managing editor of Passionfruit, since 2017. He is a member of the New York State Bar Association.
