= Chris Cillizza =

American political journalist (born 1976)

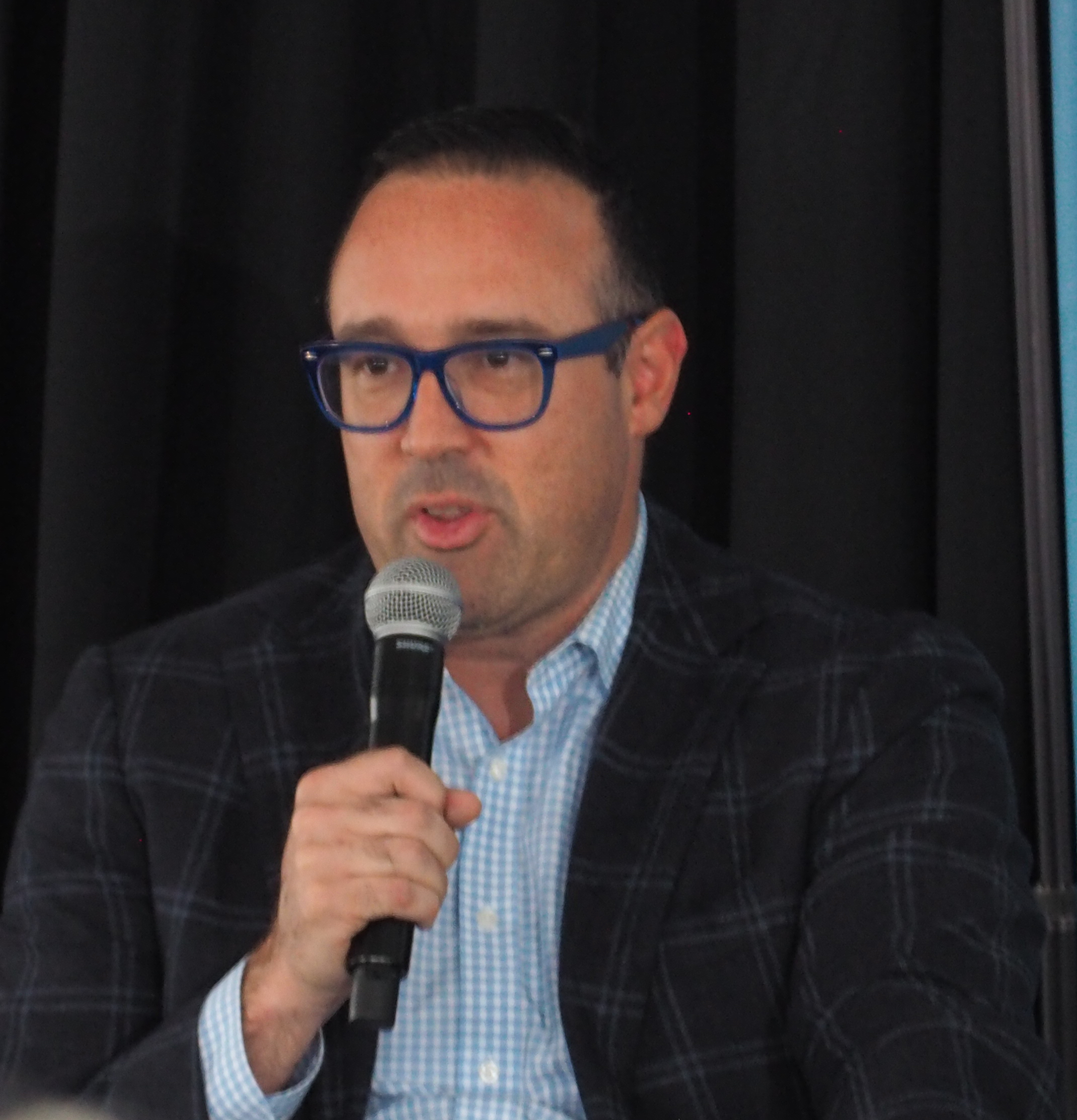
- Cillizza at the 2024 Gaithersburg Book Festival
- Born: Christopher Michael Cillizza; February 20, 1976 (age 50); Marlborough, Connecticut, U.S.
- Education: Georgetown University (BA)
- Occupation: Political commentator
- Spouse: Gia Cillizza
- Website: youtube.com/@chriscillizza

Christopher Michael Cillizza (/sɪˈlɪzə/sil-IZ-uh; born February 20, 1976) is an American political commentator, who worked for the television news channel CNN from 2017 to 2022. Prior to joining CNN, he wrote for The Fix, the daily political blog of The Washington Post, and was a regular contributor to the Post on political issues, a frequent panelist on Meet the Press, and an MSNBC political analyst.

Currently, he maintains a political blog on Substack titled So What.

== Early life and education ==
Cillizza was born and raised in Marlborough, Connecticut. He attended The Loomis Chaffee School, an independent boarding school in Windsor, Connecticut, and graduated in 1994. He attended Georgetown University from 1994 to 1998, where he graduated with a B.A. in English. He currently resides in Falls Church, Virginia with his wife and two children. He is of Sicilian and Irish descent.

== Career ==
Cillizza initially aspired to be a novelist, but struggled to get published. In his sophomore year at Georgetown, Cillizza was an intern for conservative writer George Will. Through Will, he learned of an opening at The Cook Political Report, and interviewed with Charlie Cook, who hired him as a political reporter in 1998. For The Cook Political Report, Cillizza covered gubernatorial races and southern House races. He later worked on the Washington, D.C. newspaper Roll Call prior to joining The Washington Post. He also wrote a column on politics for Congress Daily. During his four years at Roll Call, which he joined in June 2001, he reported on campaign politics from the presidential to the congressional level, finishing his time there as the paper's White House correspondent.

His freelance work has appeared in publications such as The Atlantic Monthly, Washingtonian, and Slate. He has also been a guest on CNN, Fox News Channel and MSNBC. After multiple guest appearances on the network, he was named an MSNBC Political Analyst, a position he resigned when he accepted a position at CNN in 2017. He is also a frequent panelist on Meet the Press.

He is an adjunct faculty member at the S.I. Newhouse School of Public Communications of Syracuse University.

=== The Fix ===
Cillizza founded the blog The Fix in 2005 and wrote for it on a regular basis until he joined CNN in 2017. The blog's focus was American electoral politics, with Cillizza commenting on gubernatorial, Congressional and presidential elections. He hosted the weekly Fix live chat.

=== Media ===
From 2007 to 2008, Cillizza was a co-host of the MySpace/MTV Presidential Dialogues, which hosted John McCain, Barack Obama, and others in a live-streamed, interactive Presidential event series. Cillizza and fellow The Washington Post columnist Dana Milbank appeared in a series of humor videos called Mouthpiece Theater, hosted by The Washington Post. An outcry followed a video in which, during a discussion of the White House "Beer Summit", they chose new brands for a number of people, including "Mad Bitch Beer" for Hillary Clinton. Both men apologized for the video and the series was canceled.

In July 2012, Cillizza released his book, The Gospel According to the Fix. Written in a blog-like format, it contains lists such as "The 10 Best/Worst Negative Ads", as well as coverage of the "deep personal hatreds that politics provoke", and predictions for the 2012 and 2016 presidential elections.

Since 2014, Cillizza has served a regular co-host of The Tony Kornheiser Show.

=== CNN ===
On April 3, 2017, Cillizza joined CNN as a "political reporter and digital editor-at-large," contributing online and on television.

On June 28, 2017, CNN Politics announced the launch of "The Point with Chris Cillizza." According to the official press release, the new "multiplatform brand" will include "daily columns, on-air analysis, an evening newsletter, [a] podcast, and the launch of trivia night events in Washington, DC." The show which was on YouTube released political analysis videos hosted by Cillizza every Tuesday and Thursday.

On December 1, 2022, Cillizza was laid off from CNN.

=== NewsNation ===
Cillizza joined NewsNation in March 2025.

=== YouTube ===
On January 18, 2023, Chris Cillizza launched a YouTube show titled So What? With Chris Cillizza, featuring political analysis and other topics. He maintains maintains a blog of the same name on Substack.

== Reception ==
Lyz Lenz, writing for the Columbia Journalism Review, described Cillizza's informal, "everyman" style as being popular with readers, while noting that he has also frequently been the subject of criticism. According to Lenz, "Chris Cillizza might be the only person in America who can have goofy fun talking about Trumpcare, Russian election interference, and the emoluments clause [...] That would be great, except Cillizza's analysis—much like cheese curds, the hors d'oeuvres of the everyman he exudes—is delightful, easy-to-eat, yet often problematic upon digestion. Consequently, Cillizza tends to be a fly trap for criticism about his criticism."

Jay Rosen has compared Cillizza's approach to journalism to infotainment which turns political analysis into gamesmanship detached from real-world implications. Soledad O'Brien has described Cillizza's analysis as "facile" and "mediocre", and urged him to "be thoughtful about the stories you tell and how you tell them". David Weigel has called Cillizza a "many-times-a-day pronouncer of what 'will matter' in politics", and criticized him for focusing on predictions rather than factual analysis. In September 2020, Cillizza wrote an article stating that the three major models predicting the outcome of the then-upcoming presidential election showed Donald Trump as having "almost no chance", citing FiveThirtyEight, Decision Desk HQ, and The Economist, which gave Trump odds of 21%, 17.8%, and 13%, respectively. FiveThirtyEight's Nate Silver criticized Cillizza's interpretation, tweeting "If you don't do any reporting, have never demonstrated any insight about politics, and don't even write particularly well, you'd think you could at the very least understand that 20% ≠ 0%."

Cillizza, along with Mark Halperin and Ron Fournier, was cited by Felix Biederman and Virgil Texas as one of the inspirations for their centrist parody political pundit Carl Diggler.
