= Krystal Ball =

American journalist and TV host (born 1981)

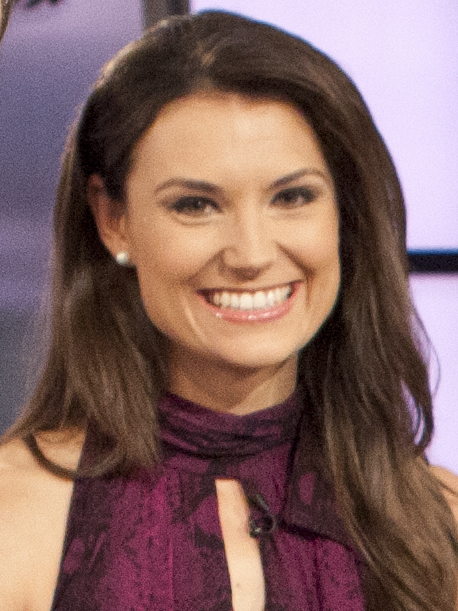
- Ball in 2013
- Born: Krystal Marie Ball; November 24, 1981 (age 44); King George, Virginia, U.S.
- Education: Clemson University (attended); University of Virginia (BA)
- Political party: Democratic
- Spouse(s): Aaron Peterson (m. 2006; div. 2007) Jonathan Dariyanani (m. 2008; div. 2021) Kyle Kulinski (m. 2023)
- Children: 3

Krystal Marie Ball (born November 24, 1981) is an American political commentator and political podcast host currently co-hosting the American political news and opinion series Breaking Points alongside Saagar Enjeti. She was previously a co-host on the MSNBC show The Cycle, a regular contributor to The Huffington Post, and a co-host of The Hill's Rising along with Enjeti. In May 2021, Ball and Enjeti announced that they were leaving the show in order to launch their own independent project titled Breaking Points with Krystal and Saagar. Ball is the co-host, alongside her husband Kyle Kulinski, of the podcast Krystal Kyle & Friends.

Ball has also been a political candidate; she was the Democratic nominee for Virginia's 1st congressional district in the 2010 election, losing to Republican incumbent Rob Wittman. In May 2017, she created the People's House Project, a political action committee working on behalf of Democratic causes.

== Early life and education ==
Ball was born on November 24, 1981, in King George County, Virginia, 60 miles south of Washington, D.C. Her father, Edward Ball, is a physicist, and mother, Rose Marie Ball, a teacher. The name Krystal came from her father, who wrote his dissertation on crystals. She has two older sisters.

Ball graduated from King George High School in King George, Virginia and then attended Clemson University for one year before transferring to the University of Virginia, where she received a bachelor's degree in economics.

== Career ==
Ball is a business owner and a certified public accountant. She previously worked for the federal contractor CGI Inc.. Leaving CGI, she went on to design educational software in a business owned with her husband, working internationally. She is a former columnist for The Atlantic.

=== 2010 U.S. House campaign ===
In 2010, Ball ran to represent Virginia's 1st congressional district in the U.S. House of Representatives against Republican incumbent Rob Wittman. During the campaign, Ball supported education reform, including charter schools, using technology, alternative certification of teachers, and paying teachers six-figure salaries. She also called for a lifetime ban on lobbying by former members of Congress, banning lobbyist gifts, increasing disclosure, and establishing a new Independent Ethics Commission to investigate and audit influence by special interests. 72% of her fundraising came from out-of-state donors. In total, she raised $1.06 million, 20% less than Wittman.

One month before the election, bloggers posted sexually suggestive photos of Ball with her then-husband from a Christmas party in 2004. Her campaign had little national attention before the incident. Ball initially blamed her opponent, Wittman, for the leak as being part of a smear campaign. Wittman released a statement opposing the leak and asked the bloggers to take it down. Ball also complained about the double standard of expectations for male and female candidates given the scant attention Scott Brown had received for previously posing nude in Cosmopolitan. She took the experience as a warning of a potential chilling effect the Internet might have on future political candidates, arguing people should not be shamed out of a race because of mistakes made in their youth.

Ball lost to Wittman by a margin of 63.90% to 34.76%.

=== 2012–2017: The Cycle and PAC ===
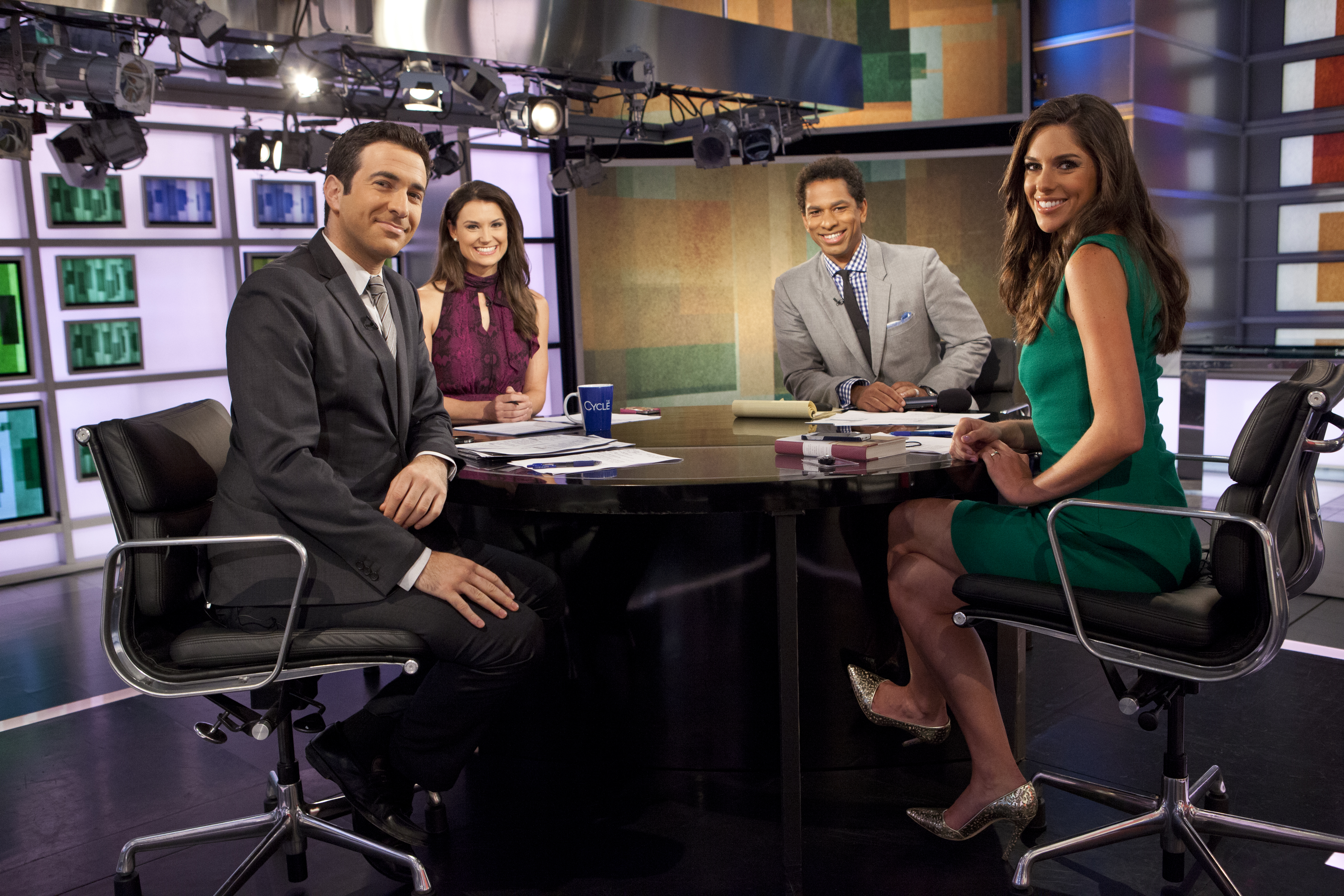
Hosts of The Cycle in 2013: Ari Melber, Krystal Ball, Touré and Abby Huntsman

In part due to the photo scandal from the 2010 campaign, Ball appeared on Fox News, CNN, and CNBC, and became a regular contributor for MSNBC. She was a regular contributor to the HuffPost. From June 25, 2012, to July 31, 2015, Ball co-hosted the MSNBC show, The Cycle, with Touré, Steve Kornacki, and S. E. Cupp. Interviewed by Jill Filipovic, she explained how she launched a new career as a political commentator on television. One of her most discussed monologues on the show was a 2014 critique of Hillary Clinton which urged her not to run for President.

In 2012, Ball launched a website calling for a boycott of advertisers on The Rush Limbaugh Show after Limbaugh's comments about Sandra Fluke. ThinkProgress reported on March 2, 2012, that over 50 advertisers were confirmed to have dropped the show. She was a Senior Fellow of the New Leaders Council. Ball's first book, Reversing the Apocalypse: Hijacking the Democratic Party to Save the World, was published in 2017, in which she argued that the Democratic Party needed to return to its New Deal roots by emulating Franklin D. Roosevelt and advocating a more economically interventionist agenda than it has done in recent decades.

==== People's House Project PAC ====
In May 2017, Ball created the People's House Project (PHP), a political action committee (PAC) working on behalf of Democratic causes. It was among the largest contributors to Richard Ojeda's campaign for the West Virginia Senate.

In May 2018, Alex Roarty of McClatchyDC wrote of her PAC: "But thus far, nobody has benefited more financially from the group than Ball herself. Of the $445,000 Ball raised for the group, she paid herself more than a third of that—$174,000—in salary, according to documents filed with the Federal Election Commission. The majority of her salary—$104,000—came in the first three months of this year alone. That's nearly eight times more than the nearly $22,000 the PHP has used to support its dozen endorsed candidates, some of whom have received just a single $1,000 contribution." Roarty questioned the discrepancy between personal salary and candidate contributions, and how much PHP was actually doing to support campaigns.

Ball responded to Roarty's claims, stating that PHP does not operate in the same way as a typical PAC, in that it is not a "direct conduit" of funds, and that she herself is effectively a manager for each of the candidates she works with. Roarty noted that the candidates and campaign officials Ball had assisted had said that she "was a go-to adviser for all manner of problems and questions. Her help was especially valuable, they added, because most of them couldn't afford the kind of high-priced consultants who usually guide campaigns, especially for first-time candidates... There's no doubt that Ball actually helps the candidates they endorse. They've just backed a very different kind of candidates, and unlike most groups, they've prioritized political advice over direct financial assistance."

Ball also noted that, because the PAC receives money in fits and starts, she paid herself a lump sum in the first months of 2018 as backpay for what she would have earned in 2017, and that her pay "was comparable to what other PAC directors typically make". At the time, running PHP was her full-time, and only, job.

=== 2018–2021: Rising ===
In 2018, Ball started hosting a webcast called Rising on The Hill. She originally co-hosted the webcast with Buck Sexton, but Sexton was later replaced by Saagar Enjeti. Ball's second book, co-authored with Enjeti, is The Populist's Guide to 2020: A New Right and New Left Are Rising, released on February 8, 2020.

Ball supported Bernie Sanders's 2020 presidential campaign. During the 2020 impeachment inquiry into Donald Trump, she speculated that Democrats were using the Senate trial to keep Senators Elizabeth Warren and Bernie Sanders in Washington, D.C. when they would otherwise be campaigning.

In May 2021, Ball announced she was leaving Rising in order to produce her own independent show with Enjeti titled Breaking Points.

=== 2021–present: Breaking Points ===
Krystal Ball and Saagar Enjeti left The Hill in June 2021 and established an independent program published as both a podcast and a video news show on YouTube. The show, titled Breaking Points with Krystal and Saagar, achieved around three hundred thousand subscribers the first week. In late June 2023, Breaking Points exceeded 1,000,000 subscribers on YouTube.

On January 1, 2021, Krystal Ball and Kyle Kulinski launched a new podcast called Krystal Kyle & Friends.

== Personal life ==
Ball was first married to Aaron Peterson in 2006.

In 2008, she married Jonathan Dariyanani, an entrepreneur in educational software. Ball attributes her further interest in politics to her experience after becoming a new mother during the 2008 primaries and also watching the outcome of the 2008 U.S. presidential election while working in Jordan with Dariyanani. She saw how it affected people in that country and thereby gained an appreciation for the global impact of U.S. politics.

Ball became engaged to fellow YouTube political commentator and co-host Kyle Kulinski in September 2022. The two were married in May 2023.

== Published works ==
- Reversing the Apocalypse: Hijacking the Democratic Party to Save the World (Pelican Media, 2017, eBook)
- The Populist's Guide to 2020: A New Right and New Left Are Rising (with Saagar Enjeti; Strong Arm Press, 2020, ISBN 978-1947492455)

== Electoral history ==
2010 Virginia's 1st congressional district election
Party	Candidate	Votes	%
Republican	Rob Wittman (incumbent)	135,564	63.9
Democratic	Krystal Ball	73,824	34.8
Independent Greens	G. Gail Parker	2,544	1.2
Write-in		304	0.1
Total votes		212,236	100
Republican hold			
