= Soul City (disambiguation) =

Soul City, North Carolina, is a community in the United States.

Soul City may also refer to:

- Soul City (novel), a 2005 American novel by Touré
- Soul City Records (American label), a record label founded in 1966 by Johnny Rivers
- Soul City Records (British label), a soul-music record label founded in 1969
- Soul City Sirens, a women's roller derby league in Augusta, Georgia, U.S.
- Soul City, a 1986 single by The Partland Brothers
- Soul City, a 2019 album by Garou
