= Kyle Kulinski =

American political commentator (born 1988)

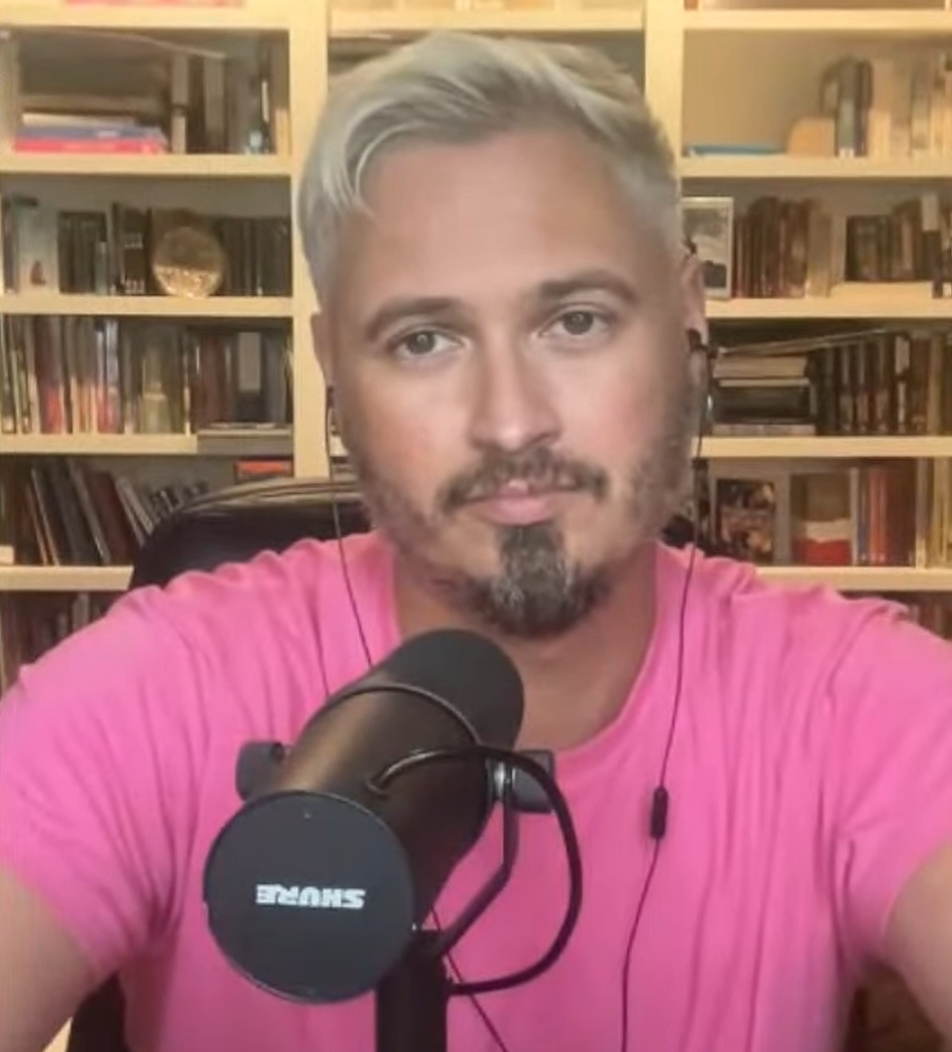
- Kulinski in August 2025
- Born: January 31, 1988 (age 38); Westchester County, New York, U.S.
- Education: Iona College (BA)
- Occupations: Political commentator; media host
- Political party: Democratic
- Spouse: Krystal Ball (m. 2023)

YouTube information
- Channel: Secular Talk
- Genre: Political commentary
- Subscribers: 2.0 million
- Views: 1.6 billion
- Kulinski's voice On the importance of alternative media in politics
- Last updated: December 25, 2025

Kyle Edward Kulinski (born January 31, 1988) is an American progressive political commentator and media host. He is the host and producer of The Kyle Kulinski Show on his YouTube channel Secular Talk, co-host on the Kyle & Corin Podcast on the YouTube channel Corin's World, and co-host with his wife Krystal Ball on the progressive podcast Krystal Kyle & Friends. A self-described social democrat, Kulinski is a co-founder of Justice Democrats, a progressive political action committee (PAC) founded on the principles that the candidates it endorses must refuse donations from corporate PACs. Kulinski's style of discourse has been characterised as an example of the "Dark Woke" phenomenon.

== Early life ==
Kulinski was born on January 31, 1988, to a family of Polish and Italian descent. He was born and raised in Westchester County, New York. He graduated from New Rochelle High School in 2006 and Iona College in 2010 with a bachelor's degree in political science and a minor in psychology. His father, Albert Kulinski (1954–2011), owned a Chevrolet dealership in New Rochelle.

Kulinski credits his father's premature death (which he believes was due to inadequate healthcare), the 2003 invasion of Iraq in his teenage years, and the works of Noam Chomsky as influences that helped shape his political views.

== Career ==
=== The Kyle Kulinski Show ===
Kulinski started a YouTube channel in spring 2008, named "Secular Talk," while studying as a political science student. From the beginning of his channel, Kulinski indicated that he leaned heavily to the left and supported criticisms of creationism. On the channel, he presents the news with a "brash" and "in-your-face" tone along with jokes and profanity, in sharp contrast to the formal presentation style found in mainstream news outlets.

Disillusioned with U.S. president Barack Obama by the end of his first term, Kulinski began publishing videos full time and started broadcasting on BlogTalkRadio as The Kyle Kulinski Show. This surge in activity pushed his YouTube subscriber count above 100,000. By 2015, Kulinski was making a living from Secular Talk. Since then, his videos regularly get hundreds of thousands of views. On December 16, 2022, the channel crossed 1 billion views on YouTube. In September 2025 the show ranked as the 37th top-rated podcast on YouTube in the United States.

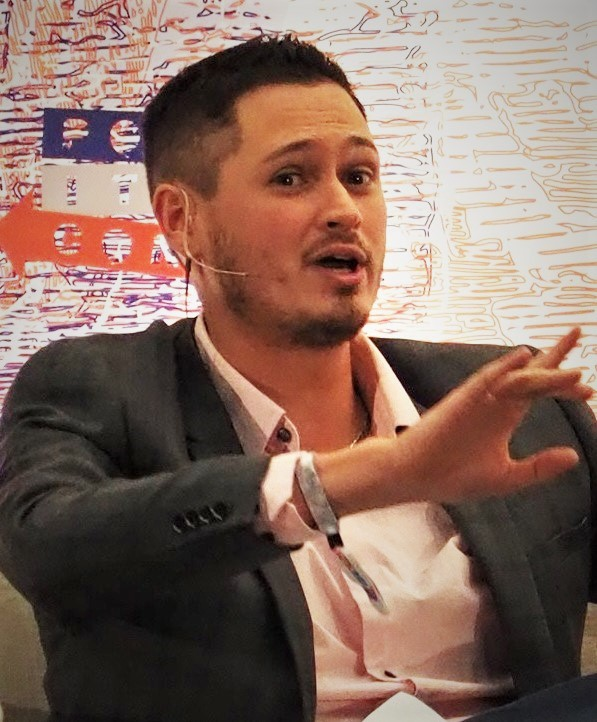
Kulinski at Politicon 2018

=== Justice Democrats ===
In December 2016, after the 2016 United States presidential election, Kulinski—alongside Cenk Uygur of The Young Turks, Saikat Chakrabarti and Zack Exley of the 2016 Bernie Sanders presidential campaign—created Justice Democrats, a political action committee with the goal of supporting progressive candidates in primary elections against more moderate Democratic members of congress. Uygur and Kulinski resigned from the group in late 2017. Since leaving, Kulinski has expressed disapproval with Justice Democrats' political strategy, and has criticized congresspeople aligned with Justice Democrats for not withholding their votes from House Speaker Nancy Pelosi in exchange for a House vote on Medicare for All.

=== Krystal Kyle & Friends ===
On January 1, 2021, Kulinski and Krystal Ball started a podcast titled Krystal Kyle & Friends, where they are both co-hosts. Notable podcast guests have included Jordan Peterson, Russell Brand, Noam Chomsky, Thomas Frank, Glenn Greenwald, Carl Hart, Justin Jackson, Bernie Sanders, Matt Taibbi, Nina Turner, Cornel West, Marianne Williamson, Richard D. Wolff, Vaush and Andrew Yang.

== Views ==
Kulinski is cited as a progressive commentator. Kulinski has been noted by The Hill for his commentary regarding various presidential candidates, including Bernie Sanders, Joe Biden and Hillary Clinton.

He has described himself as a social democrat, left-libertarian, agnostic atheist, secular humanist and an "international centrist". Kulinski advocates single-payer healthcare, free tuition at public colleges and universities, a federal living wage, reduction in military spending, military non-interventionism, abolition of capital punishment, infrastructure spending, the legalization of euthanasia, and the legalization, regulation, and taxation of drugs and prostitution. Kulinski has praised the Nordic model implemented in Scandinavian countries.

In Bridgewater State University's journal The Graduate Review, Kulinski has been described as one of the "new organic intellectuals of YouTube." Brock University's student paper The Brock Press states that Kulinski's shows proved "to be excellent pipelines for impressionable right-wingers to hear from the other side of the aisle in a rhetorical manner that appeals to them".

=== Abortion ===
Kulinski has criticized religiously motivated opposition to abortion, arguing that, according to his interpretation of the Bible, abortion is permissible in Christianity.

=== Campaign finance ===
Kulinski believes that campaign finance policy is what distinguishes progressive candidates from the mainstream of the Democratic Party, which he referred to as "just Republican-lite." When advocating for candidates endorsed by Justice Democrats, Kulinski stated "if somebody gives you a check for a tremendous amount of money, you’re going to look out for them. The Democratic Party is a shell of its former self. Get rid of the corporate money. We need to focus on the issues."

=== Israeli–Palestinian conflict ===
Kulinski considers the 2023 Israeli invasion of the Gaza Strip a genocide against the Palestinian people. He also voiced support for 2024 pro-Palestinian protests on university campuses, comparing them with protests against the Iraq War and against the Vietnam War. In each of these circumstances, Kulinski believes the protesters were "100% correct".

=== Labor ===
Kulinski opposes the use of biometrics for the purpose of employee management, characterizing this use as "rank authoritarianism disguised as corporate efficiency for consumer satisfaction."

=== LGBTQ+ ===
In 2014, when then-Fox News host Oliver North made a speech comparing fighting against gay rights to fighting against slavery, Kulinski covered the speech by saying: "Not only is there no comparison, if anything the opposition position on those issues is more like opposing slavery." Kulinski added: "To be in favor of gay rights and to try to treat people equally under the law—that is definitely a movement that is more in line with the idea behind the abolitionists of treating people equal and treating people right."

In 2022, Kulinski received Jordan Peterson on Krystal Kyle & Friends, and argued with him on the issue of transgender identity. Kulinski disputed Peterson's remark that Elliot Page's Esquire magazine cover picture was an attempt to convert children to become transgender.

=== Social media ===
Kulinski is an advocate of free speech on social media platforms such as Twitter and YouTube. He opposes limiting the reach of YouTube channels or de-platforming, arguing that freedom of speech should apply to everyone. He believes that, due to the pressure of advertisers, his own channel is being suppressed by the YouTube algorithm.

Kulinski expressed support for the journalists involved with the Twitter Files, and believes their revelations should be covered more by the news media.

== Electoral politics ==
=== 2016 ===
Kulinski supported Bernie Sanders in the 2016 Democratic primary election, and later voted for Jill Stein. While critical of Hillary Clinton, he described her as the "lesser of two evils" in the general election against Donald Trump and said that people in swing states should vote for Clinton to stop Trump from winning.

After Trump's election, Kulinski expressed his belief that progressives and liberals could successfully lobby President Trump to pursue policies such as infrastructure spending and economic protectionism. Kulinski criticizes the Never Trump movement and discourages praising Republicans who criticize Trump, stating "establishment Republicans want Trump to do every single thing he’s doing, minus the mean tweets."

=== 2020 ===
Kulinski again supported Sanders in the 2020 Democratic Party presidential primaries. After then-candidate Joe Biden became the presumptive winner of the primaries, Kulinski stated that he would not support Biden. When commenting on this position, Kulinski mentioned that he encourages his critics to "blame him" if Donald Trump were to win re-election, as he believed such an outcome would have demonstrated that candidates such as Biden require the support of progressives in order to win. Journalist Mehdi Hasan criticized Kulinski for this view, stating: "If you’re ok with a white nationalist winning a second term, I question your 'left-wing' credentials." Television host Joy Reid concurred with Hasan's criticism of Kulinski's position.

=== 2024 ===
In March 2023, Kulinski attended Marianne Williamson's 2024 presidential campaign launch event at Washington Union Station in Washington, D.C. Kulinski covered the early days of her campaign extensively, and Williamson credits him for bringing many young male supporters to her cause.

2028

On the August 4, 2026 episode of the Kyle & Corin Podcast, Kulinski endorsed writer Dan Greaney for the 2028 Republican Party Presidential Primaries, stating “Imagine having a Republican who is pro-Medicare for All and Green New Deal”.

== Personal life ==
Kulinski became engaged to fellow political commentator Krystal Ball in September 2022. On May 6, 2023, Kulinski and Ball got married.
