= Abby Huntsman =

American journalist and television personality

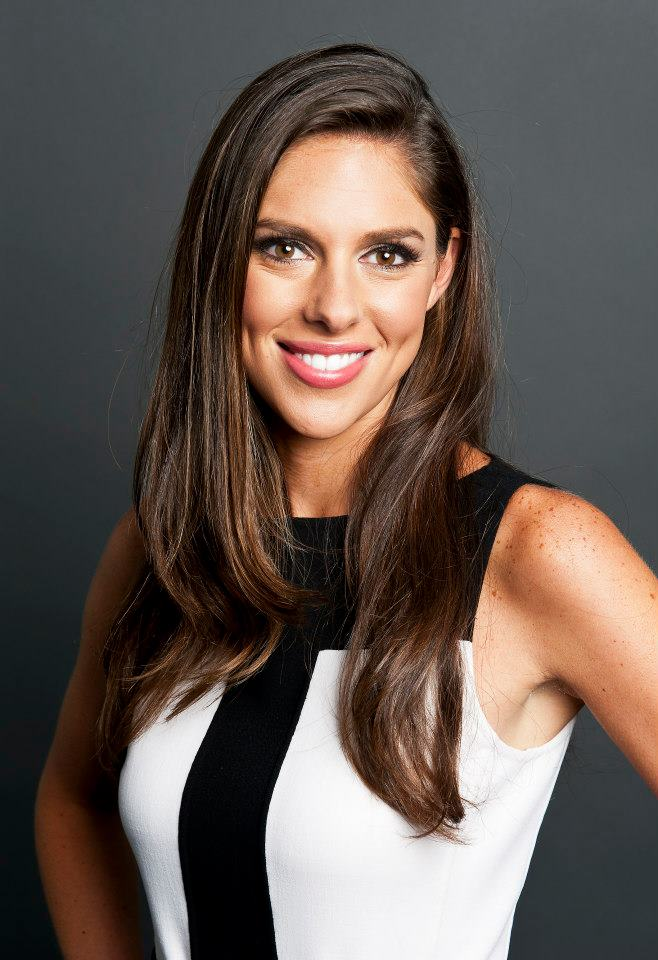
- Huntsman in August 2012
- Born: Abigail Haight Huntsman; May 1, 1986 (age 40); Philadelphia, Pennsylvania, U.S.
- Education: University of Utah; University of Pennsylvania (BA)
- Occupations: Co-Host, The View (talk show)
- Television: ABC
- Political party: Republican
- Spouse: Jeffrey Livingston (m. 2010)
- Children: 3
- Parent(s): Jon Huntsman Jr. Mary Kaye Huntsman
- Relatives: Jon Huntsman Sr. (grandfather)

Abigail Haight Huntsman (born May 1, 1986) is an American journalist and television personality. The daughter of former Utah governor Jon Huntsman Jr. and Mary Kaye Huntsman, Huntsman rose to prominence as a host on MSNBC and NBC News. She then became a general assignment reporter for Fox News Channel and later a co-host of Fox & Friends Weekend. Huntsman co-hosted the ABC talk show The View from September 2018 to January 2020.

== Early life and education ==
Huntsman was born in Philadelphia, Pennsylvania, on May 1, 1986. She was raised in Utah but spent several years in Taiwan and Singapore during her father's foreign postings as a U.S. ambassador.

Huntsman graduated from East High School. She attended the University of Utah for her freshman year of college while her father was running for governor. She transferred to the University of Pennsylvania, where she graduated in 2008 with a Bachelor of Arts degree in political science and communications.

== Career ==
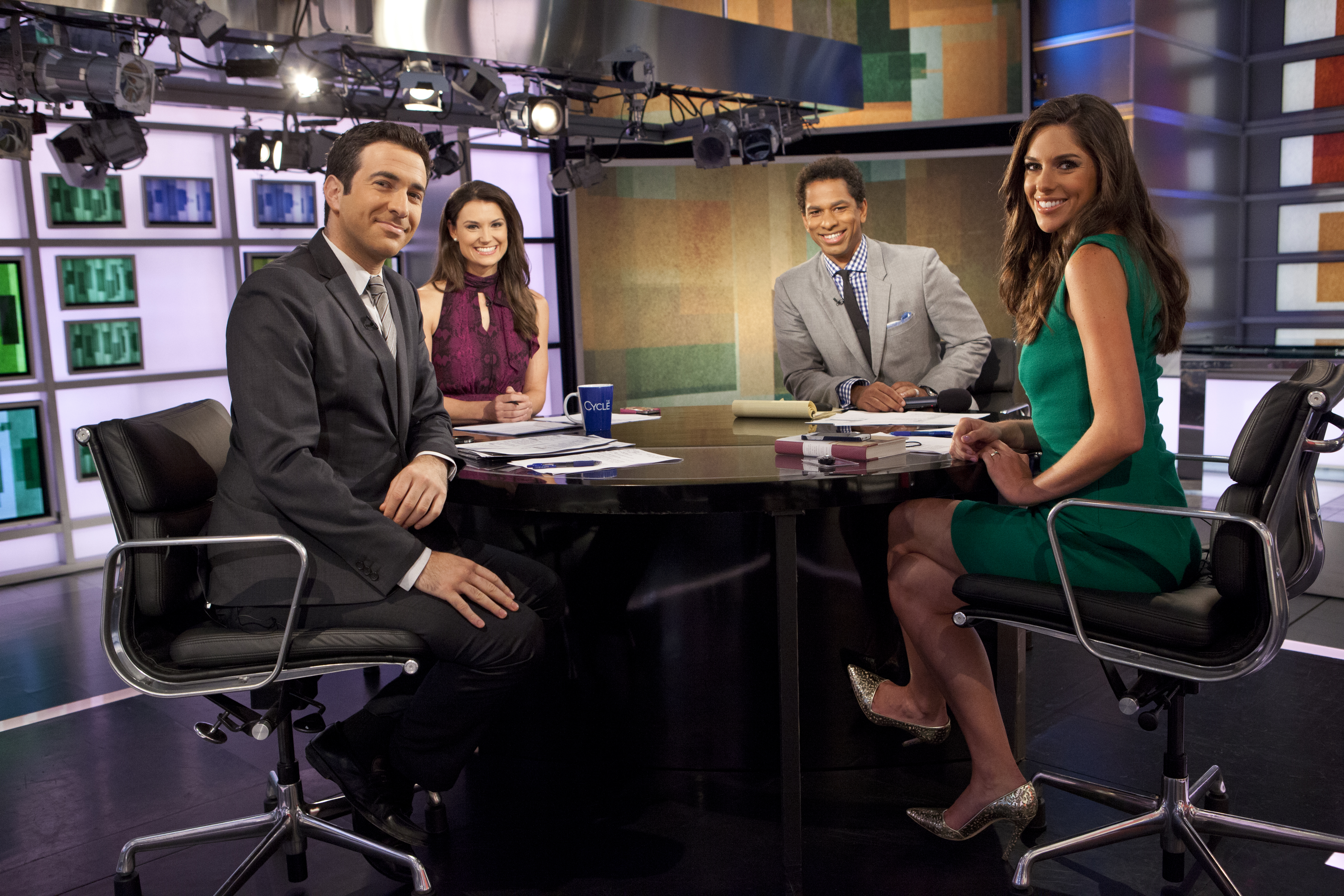
Ari Melber, Krystal Ball, Touré, and Huntsman on The Cycle on MSNBC in July 2013

At age 16, Huntsman worked a behind-the-scenes position at Good Morning America. She disliked it so much that she contemplated giving up on television "forever". While attending the University of Pennsylvania, Huntsman interned with Diane Sawyer. Sawyer's representation of herself and manner of presenting news impressed her. "I always think of her as someone that I hope I can try to be like," she said in October 2015.

She later became a host and producer for HuffPost Live, the HuffPost's streaming network. She had also been a frequent guest on CNN.

Huntsman worked on her father's 2012 presidential campaign as a media advisor and surrogate, during which she and her sisters were profiled by The New Yorker, GQ, and BuzzFeed.

Huntsman appeared as a political commentator for ABC News in Washington, D.C. and Good Morning America in New York City.

In October 2012, Huntsman was profiled in ABC News's "Five Questions", a part of This Week with George Stephanopoulos. In August 2012, she was interviewed by Brian Williams on Rock Center about Mitt Romney's run for president and her own relationship with the Mormon faith. Previously, she held a position at the international public relations firm Burson-Marsteller.

In 2013, she was listed as number 26 on the Forbes 30 under 30 list of up and coming members in media.

In July 2013, Huntsman joined MSNBC's The Cycle, filling a vacancy created by the departure of former panelist S. E. Cupp. Huntsman was the second replacement host to join the show after Ari Melber. She sought to bring conservative views to the program, and denied that her relation to the Huntsman family had anything to do with her acquiring the position since she, in her own words, "went through the same audition process as everybody else", against a field she recalled featured several hundred candidates. Two years later, in July 2015, MSNBC canceled the show, and Huntsman left the network.

In October 2015, Huntsman was hired by Fox News as a general assignment reporter. She covered the news of the day across the network's daytime and primetime programming. Two months later, in December 2016, she was named a new co-host of Fox & Friends Weekend. On August 12, 2018, she made her final appearance as co-host of the program.

On September 4, 2018, Huntsman joined the long-running ABC talk show The View as one of five co-hosts along with Joy Behar, Whoopi Goldberg, Sunny Hostin, and Meghan McCain. In 2019, along with her co-hosts, she was nominated for a Daytime Emmy Award for Outstanding Entertainment Talk Show Host.

In January 2020, Huntsman announced that she was departing The View after two seasons to become a senior advisor to her father's 2020 campaign for governor of Utah; she made her final appearance as a co-host on the January 17, 2020 episode. Her father lost Utah's 2020 Republican gubernatorial primary to Spencer Cox.

== Personal life ==
In August 2010, Huntsman married her University of Pennsylvania boyfriend, Jeffrey Bruce Livingston, in 2010 in an Episcopal service at Washington National Cathedral. The couple has three children: two daughters and a son, and live in Greenwich, Connecticut.

Huntsman is a Republican.

In early 2013, she recorded an advertisement with Margaret Hoover and Meghan McCain supporting same-sex marriage. "I think it's a generational issue, and I think over time you're going to see more and more Republicans support the freedom to marry. I'm happy and proud of that movement," she said in support of the ad.

In October 2016, she said she is no longer an active member of the Church of Jesus Christ of Latter-day Saints.

Media offices
| Preceded by Paula Faris; Sara Haines | The View co-host 2018–2020 | Succeeded by Sara Haines |
