= Losing Our Religion =

2010 book by S. E. Cupp

Losing Our Religion: The Liberal Media's Attack on Christianity
- Author: S. E. Cupp
- Language: English
- Subject: Religion, Media bias in the United States
- Publisher: Threshold Editions
- Publication date: April 27, 2010
- Publication place: United States
- Media type: Hardcover
- Pages: 288
- ISBN: 1-4391-7316-8

Losing Our Religion: The Liberal Media's Attack on Christianity (2010) is a book-length critique of media bias by author, journalist, and conservative political commentator S. E. Cupp.

== Summary ==
Cupp declares "the liberal media" are unreliable, irresponsible, and partisan, and are inciting a "revolution" that will destabilize and dilute Christian America. She also declares The New York Times, The Washington Post, CNN, and Newsweek, etc. "mock, subvert, pervert, corrupt, debase, and extinguish" the Judeo-Christian ethic and back believers into a dark, irrelevant, morally void corner of American society.

In her book Cupp wrote, according to Newsweek, that:

- Secularist media have attempted to portray religious expression as a marginal "subculture." They overreacted to presidential candidate Mike Huckabee’s 2007 Christmas commercial by concentrating on a "strategically placed" cross formed by bookshelves in the unfocused background.
- Major media outlets did not cover President Barack Obama’s failure to acknowledge the National Day of Prayer.
- Newsweek’s review of the bestselling dispensationalist Christian fiction series, Left Behind, said, "Sociologists tell us that the United States is experiencing a religious revival, but if the bestseller lists are any guide, the revival looks more like a collective leaving of the senses."
- Film reviews of the Christian-themed Chronicles of Narnia were lukewarm despite it being a box office hit. Reviews for The Golden Compass, which attacks religion in general and the Christian faith in particular, were positive although the movie did not do well at the box office.
- Cupp also wrote that the press downplays what she calls Obama’s discomfort with religious America, and barely wrote about his covering up of religious imagery in the backdrop when he gave a speech at Georgetown University.

== Criticism ==
=== Science and religion ===
The Washington Post asked the National Center for Science Education's Joshua Rosenau "to weigh in on Cupp's scholarship" on the issue of evolution. He responded by saying that Cupp's handling of science and religion misrepresents the nature of evolution, obscures the science of biology, and dismisses the deeply held religious views of most Christians outside of the fundamentalist subculture. This is the sort of misrepresentation which Rosenau believes leads her to concoct an anti-Christian conspiracy on the part of reporters, and to say that Darwin is "quite literally the antichrist" for liberals.

In a book review in the Washington Times, Steven Livingston claims that Cupp considers science (especially evolution) to be the "enemy" of religion.

== See also ==
- Godless: The Church of Liberalism by Ann Coulter
- Slander: Liberal Lies About the American Right by Ann Coulter
