= Soul City (novel) =

2005 novel by Touré

Soul City: A Novel
- Author: Touré
- Language: English
- Genre: Fiction
- Publisher: Macmillan Publishers
- Publication date: 2005
- Publication place: United States

Soul City: A Novel is a 2005 American novel written by Touré.

== Plot ==
In a utopian setting named Soul City, Cadillac Jackson, a reporter for Chocolate City Magazine, arrives in Soul City to cover the mayoral election and falls in love with a woman named Mahogany.

== Reception ==
The Washington Post wrote that the novel was set in an African American utopia.
