= The Cycle (talk show) =

Political talk show (2012–2015)

- Genre: Political commentary
- Presented by: Krystal Ball; Ari Melber; Touré; Abby Huntsman
- Country of origin: United States
- Original language: English

Production
- Running time: 60 minutes

Original release
- Network: MSNBC
- Release: June 25, 2012 – July 31, 2015

The Cycle was an ensemble news and political talk show that was broadcast on MSNBC and hosted by four network analysts/commentators: Republican Abby Huntsman, author and culture critic Touré, The Nation correspondent Ari Melber, and former congressional candidate turned Democratic strategist Krystal Ball. Per its ensemble format, all four hosts appear on every show, with each host taking turns to facilitate the discussions.

The program debuted on June 25, 2012, and ran until July 31, 2015. On July 30, 2015, MSNBC President Phil Griffin announced that the series had been canceled in an effort to transition the network's daytime programming to more breaking news reporting and less political commentary and opinion.

== Format ==
The Cycle was an ensemble program, with all four hosts appearing on every broadcast, each one taking turns to facilitating the discussion. Usually, the segment was named after the host leading the discussion: "Touré TV", "Abby's Road", "Ari's Angle", and "Krystal Clear". "Spin Cycle" was a segment in which each host discusses a story (usually political) from their point of view. "Guest Spot" was a topical discussion with a featured guest of the day. The format was similar to The Five on rival news network Fox News, although the hosts and producers have denied that The Cycle is derivative. Ball, Melber and Touré are self-proclaimed liberal commentators while Huntsman is a self-proclaimed conservative.

== History ==
Dylan Ratigan's departure from MSNBC in June 2012 left a vacancy to fill in the network's schedule. Reports emerged that MSNBC planned to replace his show with a rotating group of hosts from the network's regular contributors.

On June 21, 2012, MSNBC announced the show's name, format and hosts, which included former Congressional candidate Krystal Ball, author Touré, Salon writer Steve Kornacki, and Daily News columnist S. E. Cupp. All four hosts were introduced during the penultimate broadcast of The Dylan Ratigan Show on June 21, 2012. The show is seen as continuing a trend of network's emphasis on political talk, and away from newscasts.

The show premiered on June 25, 2012. It occupied Martin Bashir's previous time slot at 3 pm on weekdays, with Bashir moving to the 4 pm hour, replacing Ratigan.

On March 20, 2013, Kornacki left The Cycle to become the new host of MSNBC's weekend morning program Up, after Up host Chris Hayes was given Ed Schultz's primetime slot.

On April 3, 2013, Ari Melber joined The Cycle as the permanent replacement of Steve Kornacki.

On June 27, 2013, S.E. Cupp left the program, one day after she was announced as a co-host of CNN's revival of Crossfire.

On July 17, 2013, MSNBC announced that Abby Huntsman would become the newest member to co-host The Cycle, effective July 29, 2013, to serve as the conservative replacement for S.E. Cupp

== Controversy ==
On the June 27, 2012, broadcast of the program, co-host Touré hinted that U.S. Army Ranger and former professional American football player Pat Tillman's death was suspicious, due to the fact that the U.S. Military wouldn't have wanted such a high-profile soldier criticizing the mission in Afghanistan in 2004.

On the July 5, 2012, broadcast, atheist co-host S.E. Cupp said that she "would never vote for an atheist president". When asked to explain, Cupp said she felt that a president must not represent only 10 to 15 percent of the American populace and that faith served as a "check" on presidential power.

On the July 6, 2012, broadcast, Cupp accused Ann Romney, wife of Republican presidential candidate Mitt Romney, of lying about her husband's potential running mate picks.

On the August 16, 2012, broadcast, Touré caused a controversy by stating that by calling President Barack Obama "angry", Republican presidential nominee Mitt Romney was engaging in the "niggerization" of the president. He apologized for using the word the next day.

== Hosts ==
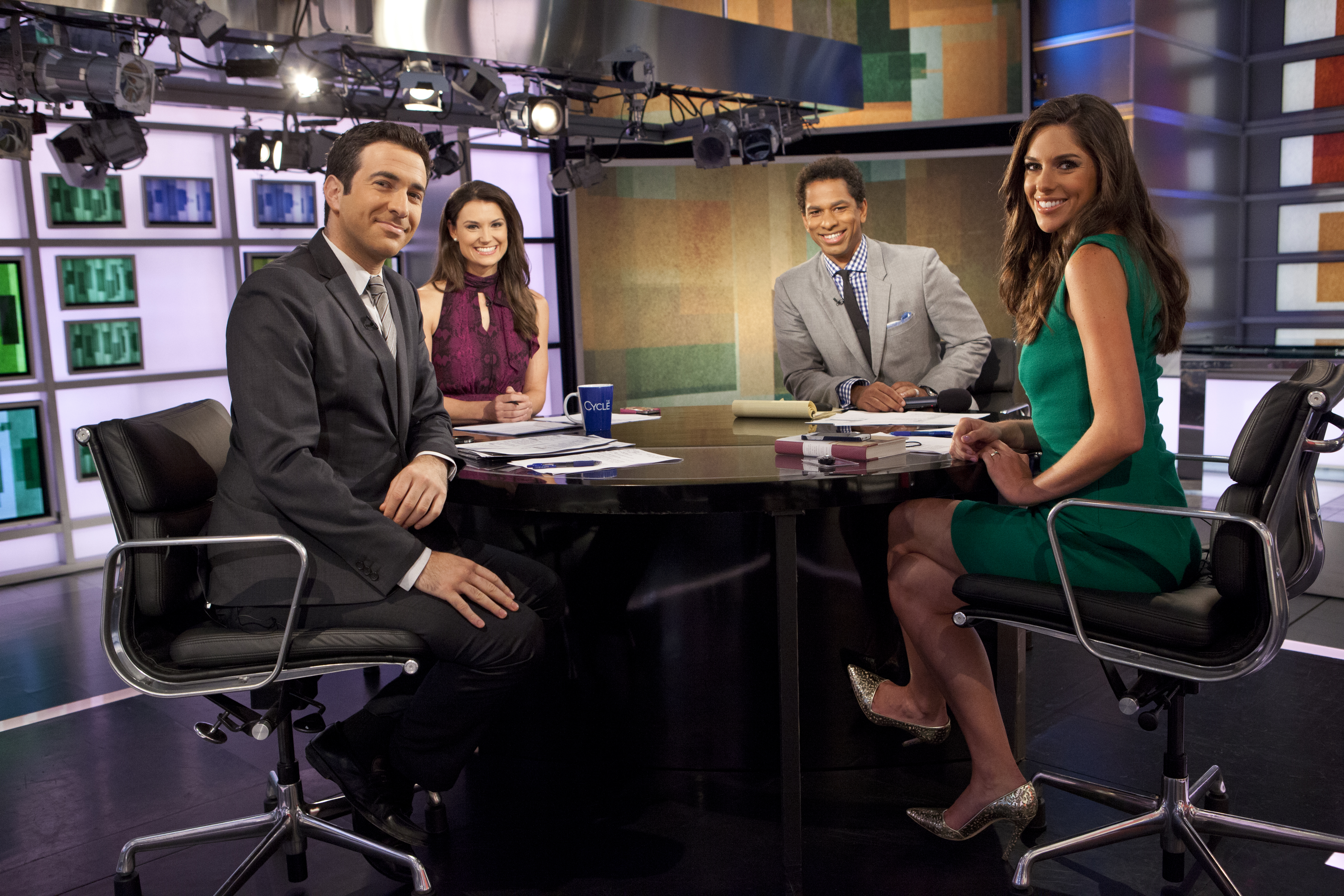
Hosts in 2013: Ari Melber, Krystal Ball, Touré, and Abby Huntsman

- Krystal Ball (2012–2015)
- S.E. Cupp (2012–2013)
- Steve Kornacki (2012–2013)
- Touré (2012–2015)
- Ari Melber (2013–2015)
- Abby Huntsman (2013–2015)

== Ratings ==
In June 2012, The Cycle debuted third in the ratings for its first week broadcast, with 105,000 in the 25- to 54-year-old demographic, and 425,000 in Total Viewers.

In July 2012, The Cycle was down 39% in the 25- to 54-year-old demo compared to July 2011.

Ratings rebounded in August 2012. "The Cycle" topped CNN in A25-54 by 16% (111,000 vs. 96,000) and ranked #1 with the younger demo of A18-34. Compared to August 2011, “The Cycle” was up 9% in A25-54, 2% with total viewers, and 113% with A18-34, the only cable news program to post growth in the hour.

In the fourth quarter of 2012, "The Cycle" was "up 89% in 25- to 54-year-olds, [up] 55% in Total Viewers and [up] 114% among 18- to 34-year-olds – more growth than all other cable news programs in the hour combined."

On June 12, 2013, "The Cycle" hit an all-time low in ratings. The program was watched by just 233,000 people in total and 34,000 people in the key 25 to 54 news demographic. Nielsen Company designates fewer than 50,000 viewers in the news demographic as a "scratch."
