= Steve Kornacki =

American journalist (born 1979)

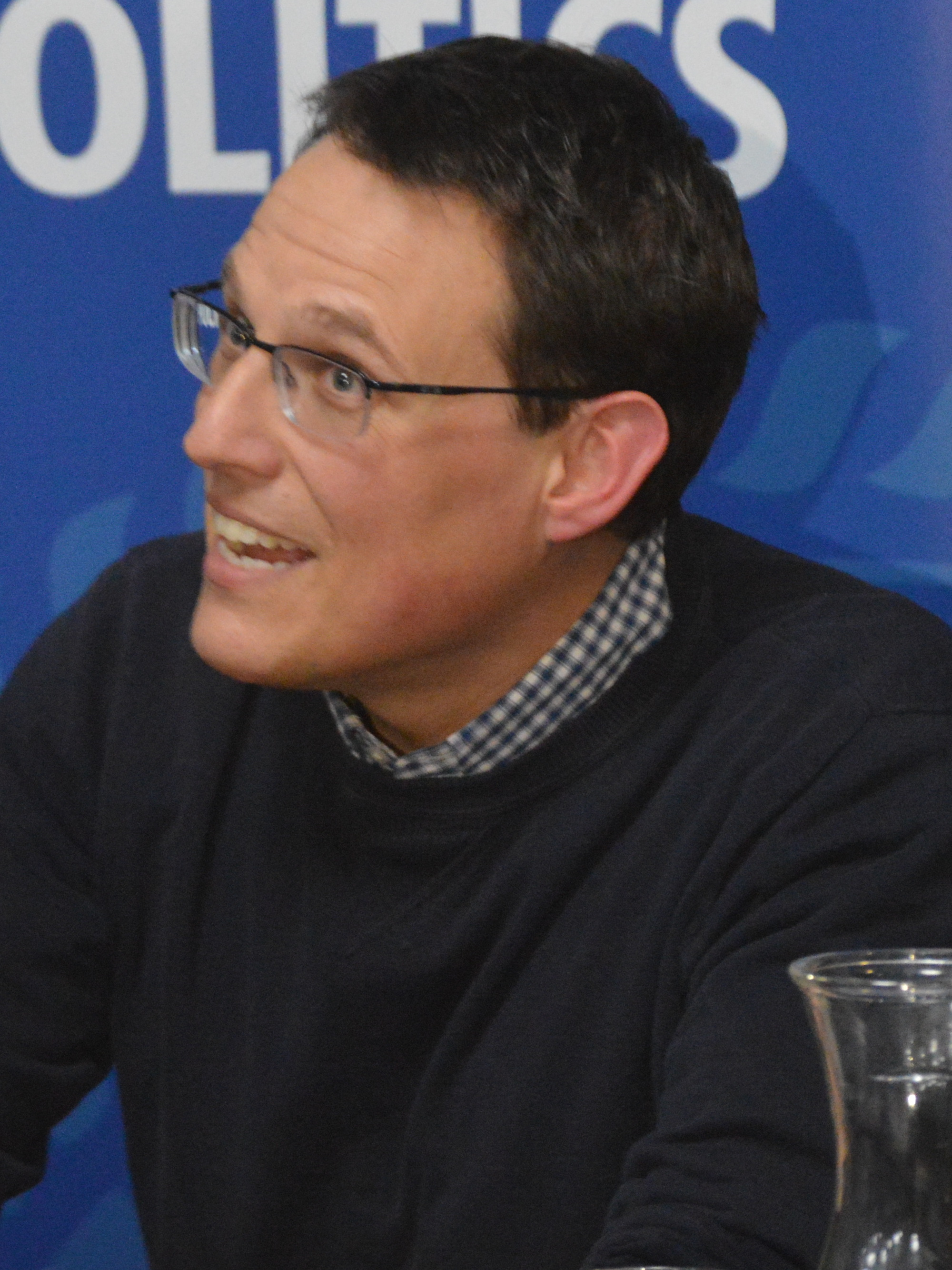
- Kornacki at the Eagleton Institute of Politics at Rutgers University in 2019
- Born: Stephan Joseph Kornacki Jr. August 22, 1979 (age 47); Groton, Massachusetts, U.S.
- Education: Boston University (BA)
- Occupations: Journalist; TV presenter; commentator
- Years active: 2002–present
- Employers: MSNBC; NBC News; NBC Sports

Stephan Joseph Kornacki Jr. (born August 22, 1979) is an American political journalist, writer, psephologist, and television presenter. Kornacki is a national political correspondent for NBC News. He has written articles for Salon, The New York Observer, The Wall Street Journal, The New York Times, New York Daily News, New York Post, The Boston Globe, and The Daily Beast. Kornacki was the multimedia anchor for much of MSNBC's The Place for Politics campaign coverage, having led the network's analysis of voting results for Election Day in the United States from 2014 to 2024.

== Early life and education ==
Kornacki was born in Groton, Massachusetts, to Stephan Joseph Kornacki Sr. and Anne Bernadette (Ramonas). He has an older sister, Kathryn Kornacki, who is a professor at Caldwell University. He went to Groton-Dunstable Regional High School. Kornacki attended Boston University and graduated with a degree in film and television.

== Career ==
He started his journalism career as a reporter for PoliticsNJ.com, a New Jersey political news site owned by David Wildstein, where he worked from 2002 to 2006. He formerly co-hosted a political news series on News 12 New Jersey and reported on the U.S. Congress for Roll Call. His articles have been published in the New York Observer, The Wall Street Journal, The New York Times, the New York Daily News, the New York Post, The Boston Globe, and The Daily Beast. He is a former politics editor at Salon.

From 2012 to 2013, Kornacki co-hosted The Cycle on MSNBC with political strategist Krystal Ball, pop-culture commentator Touré Neblett, and conservative columnist S.E. Cupp. He subsequently took over another MSNBC program, Up, airing Saturdays and Sundays from 8 a.m. to 10 a.m., starting in April 2013. From 2014 to 2024 he was MSNBC's election coverage map correspondent.

Beginning in 2016, Kornacki hosted a daily program from 4 p.m. to 5 p.m., and frequently guest-hosted Hardball with Chris Matthews, All in with Chris Hayes and The Rachel Maddow Show. On May 8, 2017, Kornacki was named National Political Correspondent for NBC News Group, with plans to continue co-hosting the 4 p.m. edition of MSNBC Live with Nicolle Wallace. In 2018 he published a book entitled The Red and the Blue: The 1990s and the Birth of Political Tribalism, which chronicles "the polarization of politics". In October 2019, Kornacki began hosting a podcast for NBC News covering the congressional inquiry and first impeachment of Donald Trump called Article II: Inside Impeachment.

Following his work on the 2020 United States presidential election, Kornacki was named by People as one of the sexiest men alive, with his use of Gap khakis eventually becoming a fashion trend on its own, colloquially referred to as "Kornacki Khakis". He was also approached to bring his unique analytic style to NBC Sports, first appearing on Football Night in America in December 2020 to break down playoff scenarios for the remainder of the 2020 NFL season. He would later make appearances on NBC's coverage of the 2020 Summer Olympics and the 2021 Kentucky Derby, where he was the only personality to correctly predict Medina Spirit as the apparent winner of the race (although the win was later given to Mandaloun after a positive drug test by Medina Spirit).

Ahead of Comcast's planned spin-off of MSNBC and other cable networks from NBCUniversal, it was announced in April 2025 that Kornacki would depart MSNBC and serve as chief data analyst for NBC News and NBC Sports. In 2026, NBC launched the Kornacki Cam for election coverage, a livestream of Kornacki analyzing incoming data.

== Personal life ==
Kornacki is gay and publicly came out in 2011 through a column in Salon. As of 2014, he resides in the East Village of Manhattan.

== Publications ==
- The Red and the Blue: The 1990s and the Birth of Political Tribalism (2018). ISBN 9780062439000. OCLC 1099946942.

== See also ==
- LGBT culture in New York City
- List of LGBT people from New York City
- New Yorkers in journalism
- NYC Pride March
