= Ron Fournier =

American business executive and former journalist

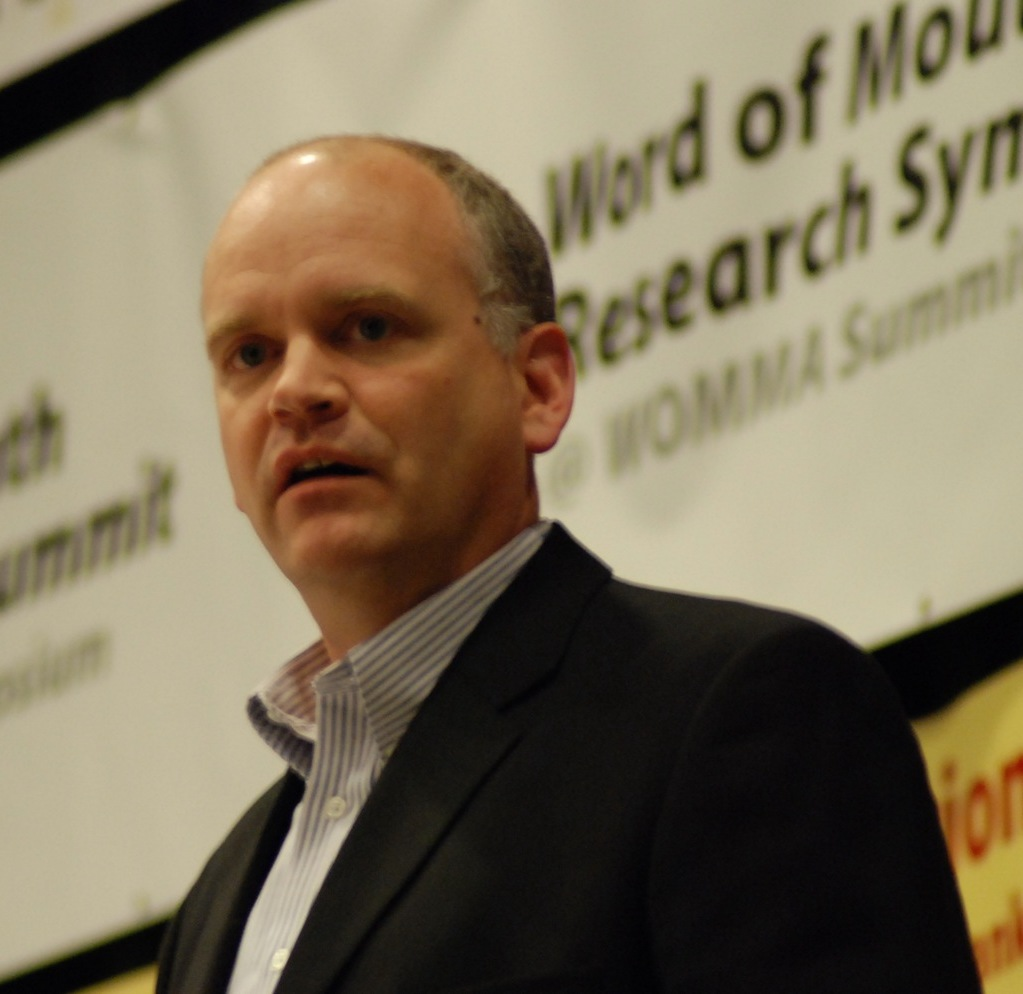
Ron Fournier

Ron Fournier (born 1963) is an American business executive and former journalist. Until 2018, he was the publisher and editor of Crain's Detroit Business. Previously he worked at Atlantic Magazine and the National Journal and as Washington bureau chief at the Associated Press (AP) until leaving in June 2010. He is a senior advisor at the public relations and lobbying firm Truscott Rossman.

== Background ==
Fournier is a native of Detroit, Michigan. He attended the University of Detroit. His wife, Lori, is also a graduate of the University of Detroit. They have three children, Holly, Gabrielle, and Tyler, all reared in Arlington County, Virginia.

== Career ==
Fournier began his journalism career in 1985 at The Sentinel-Record in Hot Springs, Arkansas. Two years later, he moved to the Arkansas Democrat in Little Rock, Arkansas. He stayed there for another two years before joining the Little Rock bureau of the AP in 1989. While there, he covered Bill Clinton during his final term as governor. When Clinton was elected president, Fournier moved to the AP's Washington bureau.

Fournier first left the AP in 2004 to take a Harvard Institute of Politics fellowship. During that period, he also co-wrote the book Applebee's America with Matthew Dowd, then-Republican strategist who went on to be Independent, and Doug Sosnik, a Democratic strategist. In 2006, he took a position as editor-in-chief of a new Internet website called Hotsoup.com, which aimed to foster discussion on a number of topics including politics. The site failed to catch on, however, and Fournier returned to the AP in March 2007 as its Online Political Editor, after considering “a senior advisory role” with Republican Senator John McCain's presidential campaign.

In May 2008, Fournier was named the acting Washington bureau chief, replacing his "mentor" Sandy Johnson. Michael Calderone wrote that since taking over the position, Fournier has led a dramatic shift in the AP's policy, moving it away from the neutral and objective tone it had become known for and toward a more opinionated style that would make judgments when conflicting opinions were presented in a story.

Fournier joined Crain's Detroit Business in 2016, becoming publisher and editor in 2017. About this time, he wrote a second book – Love That Boy: What Two Presidents, Eight Road Trips, and My Son Taught Me About a Parent's Expectations. Published in 2016, the book chronicles what he learned about being a parent on a series of road trips with his son, Tyler, who has Asperger syndrome.

Fournier currently serves on the board of directors of the Autism Alliance of Michigan. He also is a trustee of the University of Detroit Mercy.

He won the Society of Professional Journalists' 2000 Sigma Delta Chi Award for coverage of the 2000 United States presidential election. He received a 2012 Sidney Award honorable mention for the article "In Nothing We Trust", coauthored with Sophie Quinton. He is also a three-time winner of the White House Correspondents' Association Merriman Smith award.

=== Controversies ===
In February 2013, Fournier wrote a column about breaking ties with a White House official after a pattern of "vulgarity, abusive language" and "veiled threat(s)", but did not identify the official due to his policy of granting blanket automatic anonymity to all his sources. Fournier received some criticism from commentator Glenn Greenwald for behaving in a "petulant" manner and for his policy on anonymity for sources.

In 2016, Fournier was duped into interacting with fictional journalist Carl Diggler on Twitter, a character written by Felix Biederman and Virgil Texas of Chapo Trap House for CAFE to satirize "all that is vacuous, elitist and ridiculous about the media class." Fournier himself was the principal inspiration for the character, once referred to as "the real life Carl Diggler."
