= S. E. Cupp =

American political commentator and writer (born 1979)

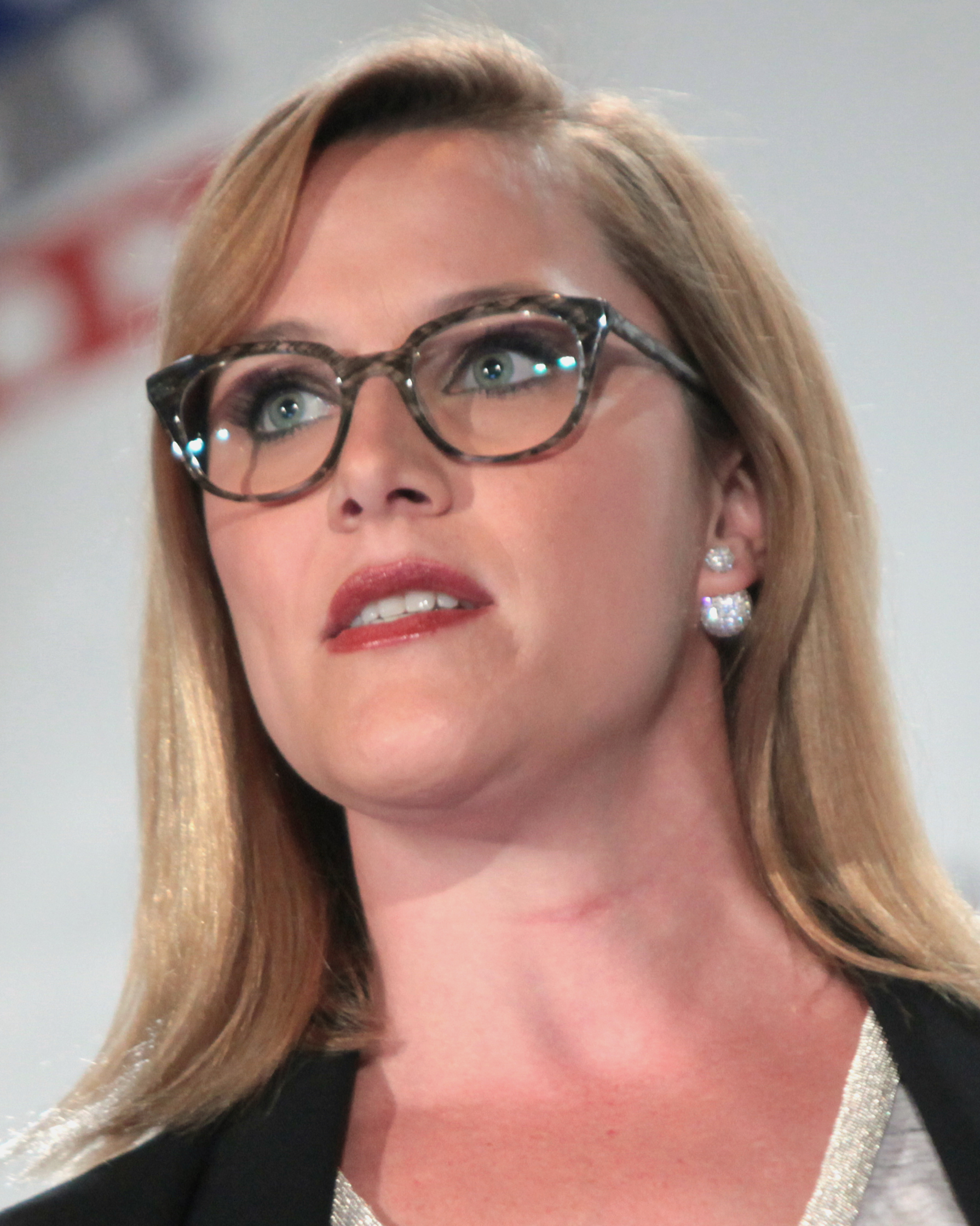
- Cupp at the 2016 Politicon
- Born: Sarah Elizabeth Cupp; February 23, 1979 (age 47); Oceanside, California, U.S.
- Education: Cornell University (BA); New York University (MA)
- Occupations: Political correspondent; television personality
- Political party: Republican
- Spouse: John Goodwin (m. 2013)
- Children: 1

Sarah Elizabeth Cupp (born February 23, 1979) is an American television host, political commentator, and writer. In August 2017, she began hosting S. E. Cupp: Unfiltered, a political panel show, co-hosted by Andrew Levy, on HLN and later CNN.

She is a former panelist on the CNN political debate show Crossfire, author of Losing Our Religion: The Liberal Media's Attack on Christianity and co-author of Why You're Wrong About the Right. She was a panelist on Real News on TheBlaze, a co-host of the MSNBC talk show The Cycle, and a frequent guest host on the Fox News late night talk show Red Eye w/ Greg Gutfeld. She is a frequent guest panelist on Real Time with Bill Maher.

== Early life ==
Cupp was born in Oceanside, California. While growing up, she lived in Andover, Massachusetts, and attended the Academy of Notre Dame. From age six until her late teens, she studied ballet. While attending ballet school, she suffered from eating disorders and experienced a relapse during her college years. In 2000, Cupp graduated from Cornell University with a Bachelor of Arts degree in art history. While attending Cornell, she worked for The Cornell Daily Sun. In 2010, she earned a Master of Arts degree from the Gallatin School of Individualized Study at New York University with a concentration in religious studies.

== Media career ==
After graduating from Cornell, Cupp worked for an online magazine and a public relations company. She was also a contributor to Politico.com's The Arena and has been a frequent guest on all three major cable news channels – CNN, Fox News, and MSNBC.

Her writings have appeared in several publications, including The Washington Post, New York Daily News, The American Spectator, Townhall, Newsmax, Human Events, Slate, Maxim, and The Daily Caller.

In 2009, Cupp was hired as a columnist at the New York Daily News. In 2011, she was hired as a writer and commentator for Mercury Radio Arts, the organization owned and operated by Glenn Beck. Shortly after being hired by Beck, Cupp was given her show, S.E. Cupp, on the Insider Extreme broadcast on Glennbeck.com. The show was moved to GBTV (now TheBlaze TV).

On June 25, 2012, she began co-hosting The Cycle on MSNBC with political strategist Krystal Ball, pop-culture commentator Touré, and senior Salon political writer Steve Kornacki.

After living and working in New York City for over a decade, Cupp moved to Washington, D.C., in 2013, after CNN hired her to join the panel of a new version of Crossfire, with panelists Newt Gingrich, Stephanie Cutter, and Van Jones. Consequently, Cupp left MSNBC and The Cycle, following her final appearance on June 27, 2013.

On March 13, 2017, CNN's sister network, HLN, announced that Cupp would host a new evening program, S. E. Cupp Unfiltered, in June. In August 2018, the program moved to CNN as a weekly program on Saturday evenings.

She began hosting a political show leading up to the 2024 United States presidential election, called Battleground, on Fox in 2024.

=== Political views ===
Throughout her career, Cupp has described herself as a "mainstream conservative" and a supporter of "limited government, self-reliance, self-empowerment, lower taxes".

Although an atheist herself, on July 5, 2012, Cupp said on The Cycle that she "would never vote for an atheist president". When asked to explain, Cupp said she felt that a president must not represent only 10 to 15 percent of the American populace and that faith served as a "check" on presidential power.

In March 2013, Cupp pulled out of a CPAC appearance because of its stances on homosexuality and gay marriage, saying she "became increasingly uncomfortable [aligning] with an event, a great event in many ways, that had nonetheless attempted to marginalize a significant group of conservatives working on our behalf." She has since joined Young Conservatives for the Freedom to Marry. She has said that Republicans should be "natural allies" for same-sex marriage.

During Ron Paul's 2012 presidential campaign, Cupp criticized his non-interventionist foreign policy, saying the United States has an obligation to "[fight] brutal regimes and human rights abuses around the world".

Cupp was strongly critical of Donald Trump's presidency, saying "I don't know these Republicans [that support Trump]. This isn't what drew me to this party." She voted for Joe Biden in the 2020 United States presidential election.

Cupp personally opposes abortion, but believes it should be legal and opposed the overturning of Roe v. Wade.

== Personal life ==
Since 1995, Cupp has been an atheist, but has consistently stated that she is open to theism, and once said in an interview with C-SPAN, "I really aspire to be a person of faith some day."

Cupp met John Goodwin, a former chief of staff to Representative Raúl Labrador, at the 2008 Republican Convention, and they began dating in 2011. They married in November 2013, and have one son. In 2017, Goodwin became head of communications for The Weather Channel, and that year, the family moved from Washington, D.C., to Darien, Connecticut.

== Works ==
- Cupp, S. E.; Brett Joshpe (2008). Why You're Wrong about the Right: Behind the Myths. New York: Threshold Editions. ISBN 978-1-4165-6282-5.
- Cupp, S. E. (2010). Losing Our Religion: The Liberal Media's Attack on Christianity. New York: Threshold Editions. ISBN 978-1-4391-7316-9.

== See also ==
- New Yorkers in journalism
