= Touré (journalist) =

American author (born 1971)

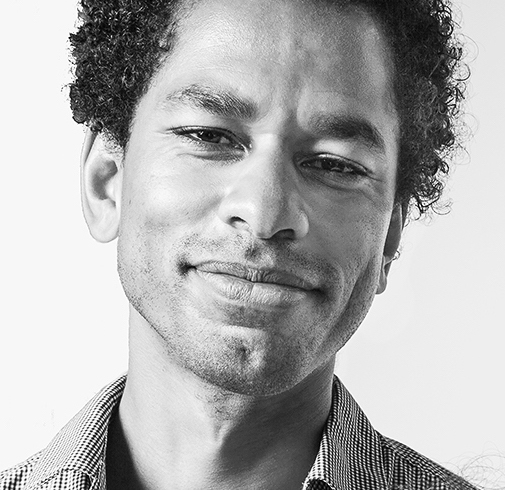
- Touré in 2014
- Born: Touré Neblett; March 20, 1971 (age 55); Boston, Massachusetts, U.S.
- Occupations: Television host; novelist; journalist; critic
- Spouse: Rita Nakouzi (m. 2005)
- Children: 2
- Website: toure.com

Touré (born Touré Neblett; March 20, 1971) is an American writer, music journalist, cultural critic, podcaster, and television personality. He was a co-host of the TV show The Cycle on MSNBC. He was also a contributor to MSNBC's The Dylan Ratigan Show, and the host of Fuse's Hiphop Shop and On the Record. He serves on the Rock and Roll Hall of Fame Nominating Committee. He taught a course on the history of hip-hop at the Clive Davis Institute of Recorded Music, part of the Tisch School of the Arts in New York.

Touré is the author of several books, including The Portable Promised Land (2003), Soul City (2005), Who's Afraid of Post-Blackness? What It Means To Be Black Now (2011) and I Would Die 4 U: Why Prince Became an Icon (2013). He is also a frequent contributor at The Daily Beast and The Grio.

== Early life, family and education ==
Touré was born Touré Neblett in Boston, Massachusetts, on March 20, 1971. His father, Roy E. Neblett, was an accountant and a member of the personal staff of Boston mayor Kevin White. Touré's parents met while Roy was studying at Suffolk University Law School, and his mother Patricia also worked at the Neblett accounting firm. Touré's paternal grandparents were immigrants to Harlem, Manhattan, New York City, New York, from Barbados and the British Virgin Islands.

He attended Milton Academy, and then Emory University, but dropped out after his junior year. In 1996, he attended Columbia University's MFA writing program for one year.

== Career ==
=== Writing career ===
While a student at Emory University, Touré founded a Black student newspaper, The Fire This Time. Touré began his writing career as an intern at Rolling Stone in 1992. He has contributed essays and articles to Rolling Stone, Essence, The New Yorker, The New York Times, Playboy, Time, The Village Voice, Vibe, The Washington Post and Ebony. His Rolling Stone article "Kurt is My Co-Pilot," about Dale Earnhardt Jr., was included in The Best American Sports Writing 2001. His writing has also been featured in the collections Best American Essays of 1999, the Da Capo Best Music Writing of 2004 and Best American Erotica of 2004.

Touré has written five books. In 2002, his short story collection Portable Promised Land was published. He also wrote a novel, Soul City (2005), set in an African-American utopia, according to The Washington Post. His 2006 essay collection, Never Drank the Kool-Aid, included the personal essay "What's Inside You, Brother?" which was considered for inclusion in Houghton Mifflin Harcourt's Best American Essays of 1996. In 2012, Touré published Who's Afraid of Post-Blackness?: What it Means to be Black Now, a book on race in modern America based on a collection of interviews Touré conducted with over 100 prominent African-American icons. Who’s Afraid of Post-Blackness? was named one of the most influential books of 2011 by both The New York Times and The Washington Post, and the book earned Touré a nomination for an NAACP Image Award for Outstanding Literary Work in Non-Fiction. In 2013, Touré published I Would Die 4 U: Why Prince Became an Icon, a biography of Prince that discusses the pop artist's works and legacy in a religious context. The book is based on a series of lectures Touré delivered at Harvard University in 2012.

=== Television ===
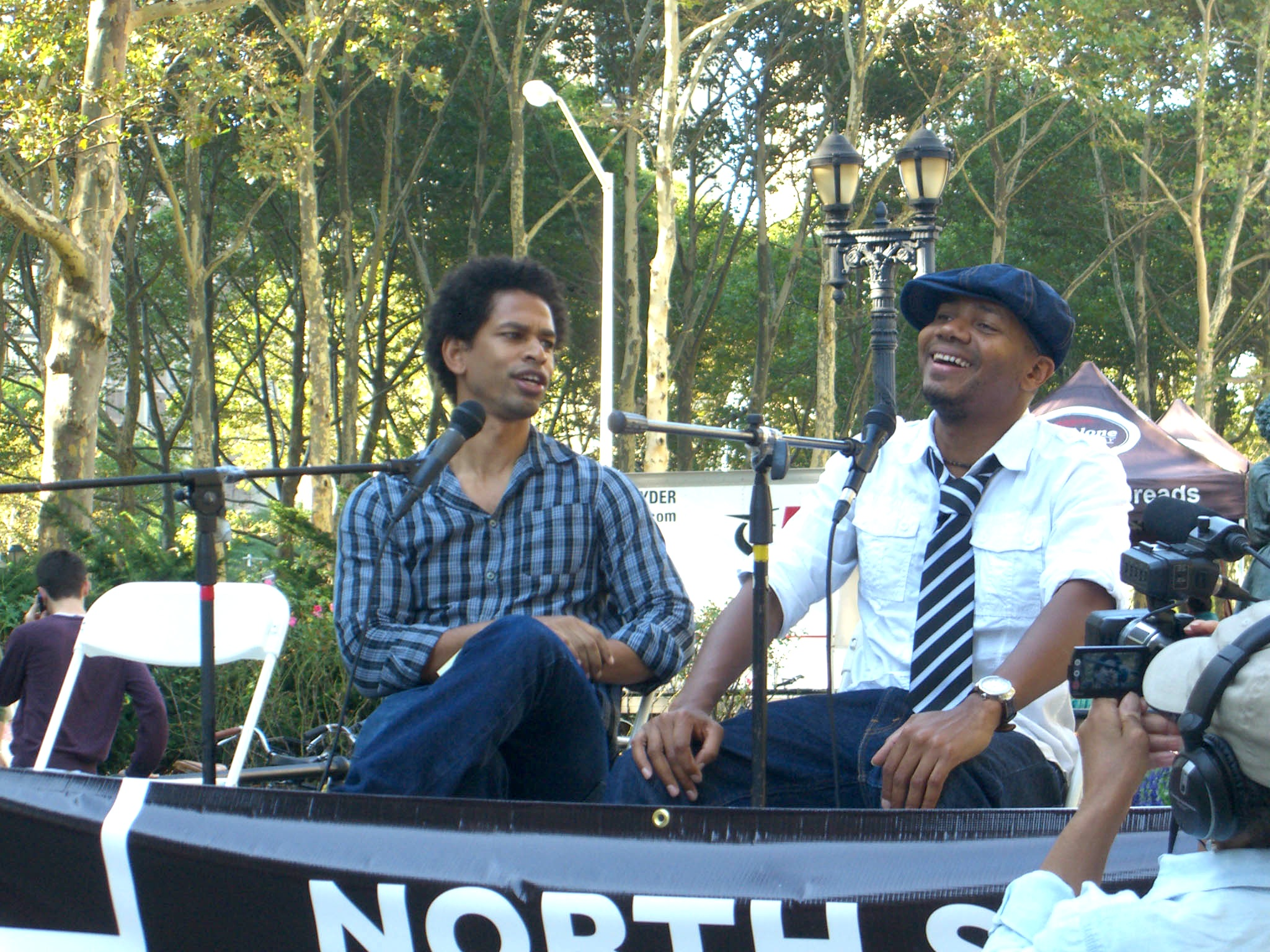
Touré interviewing DJ Spooky at the 2009 Brooklyn Book Festival

In 2002, Touré appeared opposite Paula Zahn on CNN's American Morning and was later featured three times a week on a panel called "90-Second Pop." He was subsequently hired as CNN's first pop culture correspondent. In 2005, BET hired Touré to cover BET News and Public Affairs programming.

He also hosted the series Community Surface on Tennis Channel and MTV's Spoke N' Heard, and was interviewed on the life of Eminem for the rapper's A&E Biography episode. In 2008, he hosted the reality show I'll Try Anything Once, in which he tried a variety of jobs and activities, including rodeo clowning and lumberjacking.

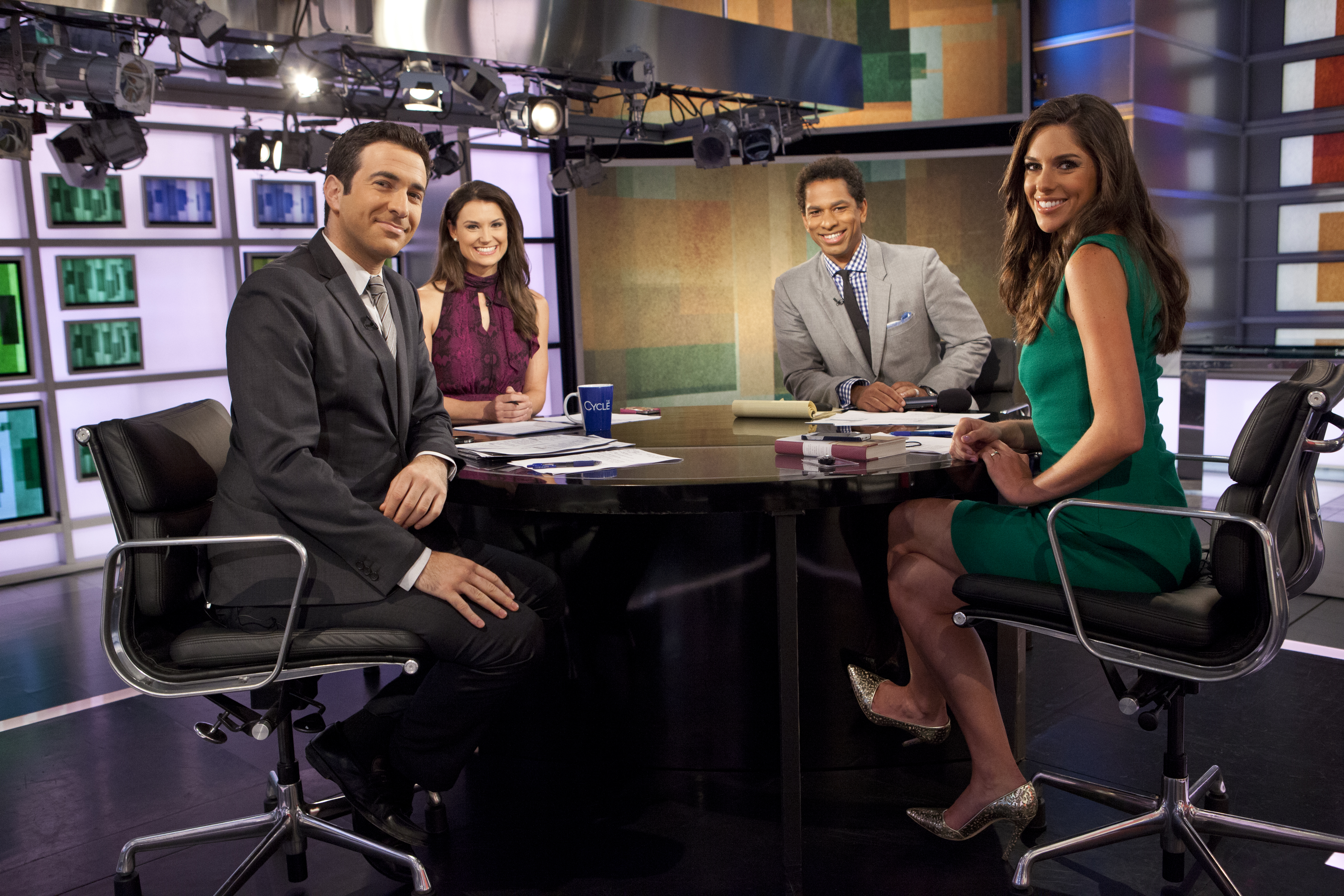
Hosts of The Cycle in 2013: Ari Melber, Krystal Ball, Touré and Abby Huntsman

From June 25, 2012, to July 31, 2015, he co-hosted The Cycle on MSNBC with former congressional candidate Krystal Ball, moderate Republican Abby Huntsman, and The Nation correspondent Ari Melber. The Cycle's key demographic was initially made up of Generation X viewers, and its success in this age bracket was attributed to the engaging personalities of its unusually young hosts. Touré often introduced race theory into political discussion on the show. On July 24, 2015, media outlets reported that MSNBC was restructuring its television lineup to eliminate shows such as The Cycle due to disappointingly low ratings. MSNBC confirmed the cancellation on July 30.

Touré criticized and debated with Piers Morgan over the latter's March 2012 interview with George Zimmerman's brother, particularly over what Touré saw as Morgan's lack of response to Robert Zimmerman's problematic replies.

In August 2012, as part of a discussion on The Cycle, Touré claimed Republican presidential nominee Mitt Romney had engaged in racial coding by calling President Barack Obama "angry," and referred to this as "niggerization." Touré apologized for using the word the next day.

In May 2014, Touré drew criticism from the Simon Wiesenthal Center for implying Holocaust survivors succeeded in the U.S. after the Second World War because they were white: a blogger from the website Yo, Dat's Racis'!! tweeted at Touré, "My family survived a concentration camp, came to the US w/ nothing, LEGALLY, and made it work" to which Touré replied, "the power of whiteness." Touré later apologized for his comment, saying, "In an attempt to comment on racism in post World War II America, I used a shorthand that was insensitive and wrong."

== Personal life ==
On March 19, 2005, Touré married Lebanese American novelist and pop culture commentator Rita Nakouzi. They have two children. Rev. Run from Run-DMC was the officiant, and Nelson George served as the best man. Touré and his wife live in the Fort Greene neighborhood of Brooklyn, New York.

On January 11, 2019, Touré was accused of workplace sexual harassment by a makeup artist who had worked with him in 2017. Touré publicly apologized for his behavior, saying, "On the show, our team, including myself, engaged in edgy, crass banter, that at the time I did not think was offensive for our tight-knit group. I am sorry for my language and for making her feel uncomfortable in any way. As a lead on the show, I should have refrained from this behavior. I have learned and grown from this experience."

== Bibliography ==
- The Portable Promised Land: Stories. New York: Back Bay Books. 2003. ISBN 978-0-316-73836-1.
- Soul City: A Novel. New York: Macmillan. 2005. ISBN 978-0-312-42516-6.
- Never Drank the Kool-Aid: Essays. New York: Macmillan. 2006. ISBN 978-0-312-42578-4.
- Who's Afraid of Post-Blackness? What It Means to Be Black Now. New York: Simon and Schuster. 2011. ISBN 978-1-4391-7756-3.
- I Would Die 4 U: Why Prince Became an Icon. New York: Atria Books. 2013. ISBN 978-1476705491.
