= Pundit =

Someone who offers their opinion via mass media

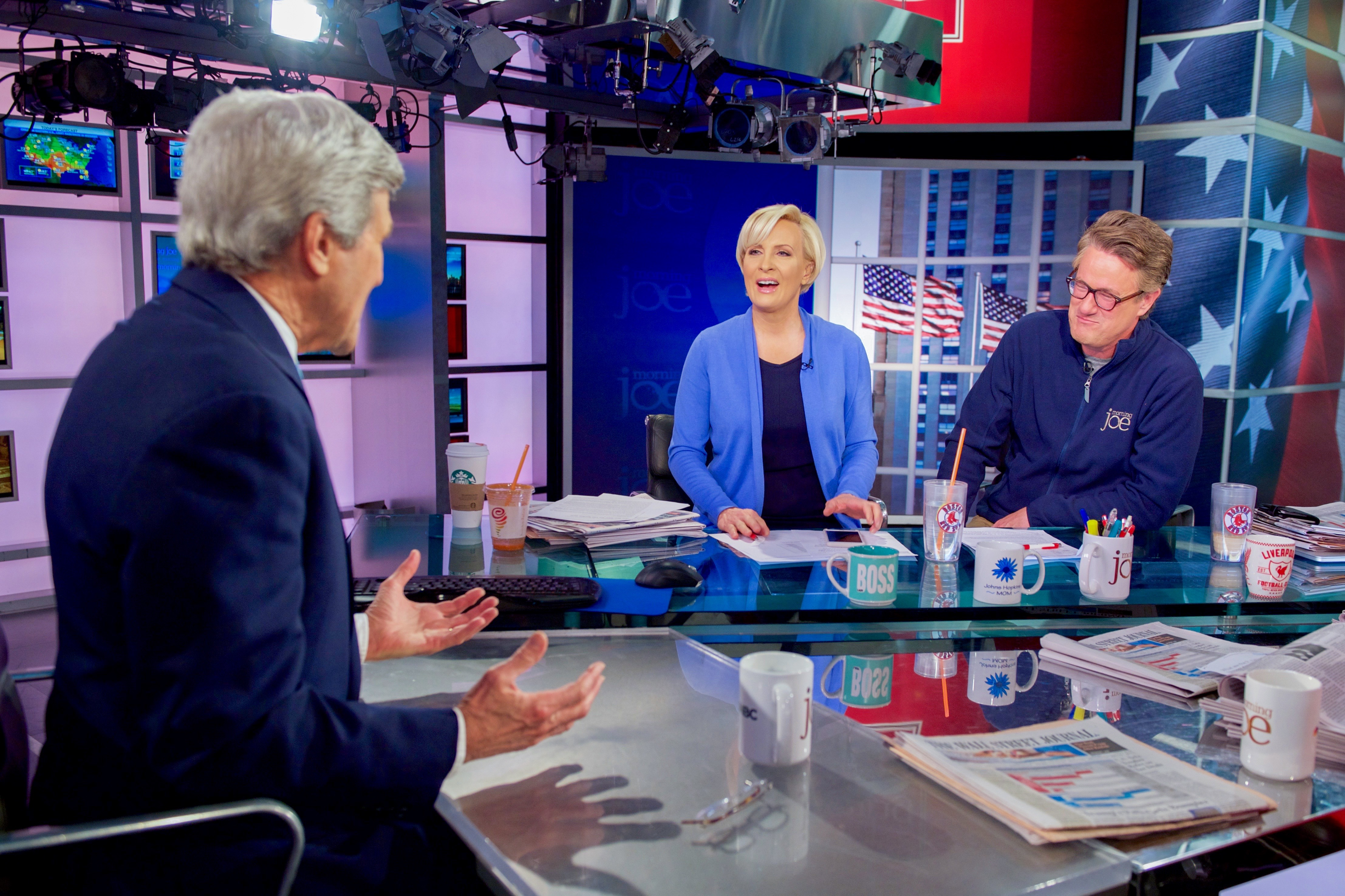
Joe Scarborough and Mika Brzezinski of MSNBC's Morning Joe are examples of political pundits.

A pundit is a person who offers opinion in an authoritative manner on a particular subject area—typically politics, the social sciences, technology or sport—in mass media.

== Etymology ==
The term pundit originates from the Sanskrit pandit (paṇḍitá पण्डित), meaning "knowledge owner" or "learned man". It refers to someone who is erudite in various subjects and who conducts religious ceremonies and offers counsel to the king and usually referred to a person from the Hindu Brahmin but may also refer to the siddhas, Siddhars, Naths, ascetics, sadhus, or yogis (rishi).

From at least the early 19th century, a pundit of the supreme court in Colonial India was an officer of the judiciary who advised British judges on questions of Hindu law. In Anglo-Indian use, pundit also referred to a native of India who was trained and employed by the British to survey inaccessible regions beyond the British frontier.

== History ==
Josef Joffe's book chapter The Decline of the Public Intellectual and the Rise of the Pundit describes a change in the role of public experts and relates to developments in the audience and the media itself. In the second half of the 20th century, Hannah Arendt, Jürgen Habermas and others gained a certain position in the US as public intellectuals due to the (over)specialization of US academics, according to Richard A. Posner

A pundit now combines the roles of a public intellectual and has a certain expertise as a media practitioner. They play an increasing role in disseminating ideas and views in an accessible way to the public. From Joffe's view, Karl Marx in Europe and e.g. in the US, Mark Twain were early and relentless pundits. In addition, the growing role of think tanks and research institutions like the Brookings Institution, the American Enterprise Institute and the Manhattan Institute provided a place for those dealing with 'big issues' in public language.

The term talking head—in existence since 1964—may refer to pundits. It has derogatory overtones. For example, the judge in the David Westerfield trial in San Diego in 2002 said "The talking heads are doing nothing but speculating about what the jury may or may not be thinking".

Punditry has become a more popular vehicle in nightly newscasts on American cable news networks. A rise of partisanship among popular pundits began with Bill O'Reilly of Fox News Channel. His opinion-oriented format led him to ratings success and has led others, including Bill Maher, Keith Olbermann, and Nancy Grace to express their opinions on matters on their own programs.

In sports commentating, a "pundit" or color commentator may be partnered with a play-by-play announcer who will describe the action while asking the pundit for analysis.

Pundette is sometimes used as a female version of the term. According to Stephen Klein, Assistant Teaching Professor of Political Communication at the University of Missouri, pundettes "seemed to capitalize on a combination of conservative identity, confrontational rhetorical style and sexual attractiveness in order to gain media attention". The term is sometimes used dismissively by those that disagree with a pundette's position. Women described as pundettes, however, often embrace the term. More recently the term has expanded to include women commentators in a variety of fields, political views and races.

== Examples ==
Popular in the United States during 2007 according to a Forbes top 10 list:

- Politics and current events
  - Al Franken
  - Bill Maher
  - Bill O'Reilly
  - Geraldo Rivera
  - Greta Van Susteren
  - Lou Dobbs
  - Rosie O'Donnell
  - Rush Limbaugh
  - Ann Coulter
  - Kellyanne (Fitzpatrick) Conway
  - Maureen Dowd
  - Nancy Giles
  - Laura Ingraham
  - Heather Nauert
  - Barbara Olson
- Film
  - Roger Ebert
  - Leonard Maltin

== See also ==
- Columnist
- Opinion leadership
- Carl Diggler – fictional character parodying contemporary American political pundits
- Stephen Colbert (character)
- Talk radio
- Talk show
