= Trumped (2017 film) =

Trumped: Inside the Greatest Political Upset of All Time
- Promotional poster
- Directed by: Ted Bourne; Mary Robertson; Banks Tarver
- Produced by: Kevin Vargas
- Starring: Donald Trump; Mark Halperin; John Heilemann; Mark McKinnon
- Music by: Paul Brill
- Production company: Left/Right Productions
- Distributed by: Showtime
- Release dates: January 27, 2017 (Sundance Film Festival); February 3, 2017 (United States)
- Running time: 102 minutes
- Country: United States
- Language: English

Trumped: Inside the Greatest Political Upset of All Time is a 2017 American documentary film that chronicles the presidential campaign of Donald Trump, leading up to his electoral victory in November 2016. The film was directed by Ted Bourne, Mary Robertson, and Banks Tarver, and was created from footage that was shot for the Showtime television documentary series, The Circus: Inside the Greatest Political Show on Earth, starring Mark Halperin, John Heilemann, and Mark McKinnon; the three also appear in the film.

The film premiered at the Sundance Film Festival in January 2017, and later premiered on Showtime on February 3, 2017. Trumped received mostly negative reviews, being criticized for feeling rushed and for not going into enough detail on how Trump won the election. Critics also believed that the film was released too soon after the election.

== Overview ==
Trumped: Inside the Greatest Political Upset of All Time chronicles Donald Trump's 2016 presidential campaign, from the time it was announced in June 2015, to the time of Trump's victory in November 2016. Mark Halperin, John Heilemann, and Mark McKinnon appear in the film, which includes interviews with individuals associated with Trump's campaign, including Roger Stone.

== Production ==
During the 2016 U.S. presidential election, Heilemann, Halperin, and McKinnon starred on Showtime's television documentary series, The Circus: Inside the Greatest Political Show on Earth. Heilemann had daily access to Trump and other presidential candidates from January 2016 to November 2016. After Trump's unexpected election victory in November 2016, the production team chose to create a film to chronicle Trump's campaign.

The film's directors, Ted Bourne, Mary Robertson, and Banks Tarver, looked through thousands of hours of footage shot for The Circus to search for material that could be included in the film. Trumped was quickly put together in time for a premiere at the Sundance Film Festival. The film was announced on January 9, 2017, with plans to premiere it at the festival later that month.

== Release ==
The film debuted for film critics at the Sundance Film Festival on January 23, 2017. The film had its official premiere at the festival on January 27, 2017. In the United States, the film publicly premiered on Showtime on February 3, 2017. The film was also released on February 5, 2017, on Stan., an Australian streaming service.

== Reception ==
On Rotten Tomatoes, the film has an approval rating of 36% based on 11 reviews, with an average rating of 4.1/10. Joe McGovern of Entertainment Weekly gave the film a "C" and wrote that the "rushed nature" of the film "basically predetermined its mediocre quality. There is no step backwards here for any type of deep examination–indeed, self-examination – of the media's role. Neither is there of the candidates, their staffs, or their constituencies. And thanks to that, Trumped is something that the election, admittedly, never was: a staggering bore." McGovern further stated: "The vanilla approach, especially given Trump's eventful first 10 days in office, renders the movie as nothing more than a cash grab." Owen Gleiberman of Variety said that the film mostly "re-assembles a great many things that we have seen."

Brian Tallerico of RogerEbert.com gave the film two stars out of four and called it a "hastily thrown-together documentary" that was "likely trying to get on the air before Donald Trump has done enough to warrant a sequel or two. It's true that so much has happened on the national scene in just the last ten days that 'Trumped: Inside the Greatest Political Upset of All Time' already feels a bit dated. [...] 'Trumped' plays way too much like a highlight reel from the last year, offering not nearly enough insight into the questions surrounding Trump's campaign and now-Presidency. This is more of a movie that chronicles that he won, not how he won – those are two very different things. Just in the chronicling, a few interesting tidbits and insights come forward, but it was likely too soon to make this movie, as we don't fully comprehend what happened in the Election Year of 2016 quite yet. There will be a great documentary about it eventually. This will do until then." Tallerico also wrote, "When the people behind the show offer insight into how Trump is handling issues or how the media is handling him, 'Trumped' comes to life. But that's simply not often enough to recommend it."

Bryan Bishop of The Verge, who felt that the film was "rushed," wrote, "There's a tremendous opportunity in taking the events of the last 19 months and reassessing what happened, particularly in the interest of understanding what socio-political trends led to November 8th, and whether some of the more sinister revelations of recent weeks had been telegraphed much sooner. Unfortunately, Trumped isn't interested in any of that. [...] As a historical document, there may very well be value to this kind of tick-tock timeline, but it's hard to see what purpose it serves now, other than letting Showtime capitalize upon people's feelings about the election." Bishop further noted that "by not explaining the forces behind Trump's rise – the socio-political trends, the recent behavior of the parties, the interference and hacking from foreign governments–the film does something even more nefarious: it gives off the impression that it was just some unknowable, Trump-ian magic that led to the election results. Pair that with the full title – Trumped: Inside the Greatest Political Upset of All Time – and the movie starts to feel more like reality TV mythmaking than journalism."

Jude Dry of IndieWire gave Trumped a "C" and considered the film as "a kind of epilogue" to The Circus. Dry called the film "deja vu without the fun" and wrote, "Certainly, historical documentaries have told familiar stories before. But how historical is a documentary when the events are so close in the rearview mirror they're still causing accidents?" Dry also considered Showtime's claim of the film's "unprecedented access" to be dubious. Jenna Marotta of Decider wrote, "I so wish I could have watched the 102-minute film with no knowledge of the characters or outcome, unearthing Trumped as a historical relic of a bygone era. [...] Then again, if now's not the right time to examine the origin of our country's current leadership – as our new president issues a quick succession of executive orders prompting widespread protests–then when?"

Alissa Wilkinson of Vox wrote, "It's a competent documentary, though calling it entertaining is a stretch–that will depend on who's watching. But its very existence brings to life some of the problems that most plague American political culture – without, unfortunately, really reflecting on what it's doing. Trumped is a missed opportunity. [...] The 'inside look' that Trumped promises is not much of an inside look at the title candidate at all. In fairness, that's not really the filmmakers' fault; Trump's brand is built on letting it all hang out, tax returns and physician's reports notwithstanding. Thus, finding something to say that hasn't already been tweeted or stated on camera is almost impossible." John DeFore of The Hollywood Reporter called it a "hastily assembled" film and wrote, "If you recently returned to the U.S. after a year-long Peace Corps stint in a remote village with no electricity or mail service, then Trumped: Inside the Greatest Political Upset of All Time will serve as a reasonable primer on the nightmare you missed."

Travis Johnson of Australia's Filmink wrote "Trumped really just tells us things we already know – that nobody thought he could possibly win, that the white working class turned out in droves, that he was seemingly immune to scandal, that his election was – and is – wildly controversial. It feels somewhat unnecessary at this close a remove, seeing as how we just lived through all this stuff, but there is a kind of car-crash fascination in watching the events unfold now with the benefit of foreknowledge." Luke Buckmaster of Australia's Daily Review gave the film three stars out of five and wrote, "Perhaps a result of the film's quick turnaround time, there is an element of extended Wikipedia entry in its structure. The directors cover off on the requisite beats, starting with Trump's underdog status as contender for Republican nominee and moving forward. Americans who followed the election reasonably closely will likely feel they've seen this stuff before, though that's not the case for all audiences."
