= Bloomberg News =

American news agency

- Formerly: Bloomberg Business News (1990–1997)
- Type: Division
- Industry: News agency
- Founded: 1990; 36 years ago
- Founders: Michael Bloomberg; Matthew Winkler
- Headquarters: Bloomberg Tower, 731 Lexington Avenue, Manhattan, New York City; Bloomberg London (London and Europe); Marina Bay Financial Centre, Singapore (Asia–Pacific); Petronas Towers, Kuala Lumpur City Centre, Kuala Lumpur (Asia–Pacific); Pacific Place Jakarta, Sudirman Central Business District, Jakarta (Asia–Pacific)
- Key people: John Micklethwait (editor-in-chief)
- Number of employees: 2,300
- Parent: Bloomberg L.P.
- Website: bloomberg.com

Bloomberg News (originally Bloomberg Business News) is an American news agency headquartered in New York City, and a division of Bloomberg L.P. Content produced by Bloomberg News is disseminated through Bloomberg Terminals, Bloomberg Television, Bloomberg Radio, Bloomberg Businessweek, Bloomberg Markets, Bloomberg.com, and Bloomberg's mobile platforms. Since 2015, John Micklethwait has been editor-in-chief.

== History ==
Bloomberg News was founded by Michael Bloomberg and Matthew Winkler in 1990 to deliver financial news reporting to Bloomberg Terminal subscribers.

The agency was established in 1990 with a team of six people. Winkler was first editor-in-chief. In 2010, Bloomberg News included more than 2,300 editors and reporters in 72 countries and 146 news bureaus worldwide.

=== Beginnings (1990–1995) ===
Bloomberg Business News was created to expand the services offered through the terminals. According to Matthew Winkler, then a writer for The Wall Street Journal, Michael Bloomberg telephoned him in November 1989 and asked, "What would it take to get into the news business?"

In his book, The Bloomberg Way, Winkler recalls a conversation with Bloomberg about a hypothetical ethical dilemma that could have arisen from Bloomberg's interest in creating a newspaper:

"You have just published a story that says the chairman—and I mean chairman—of your biggest customer has taken $5 million from the corporate till. He is with his secretary at a Rio de Janeiro resort, and the secretary's spurned boyfriend calls to tip you off. You get an independent verification that the story is true. Then the phone rings. The customer's public-relations person says, 'Kill the story or we will return all the terminals we currently rent from you.'"

"What would you do?" Winkler asked.

"Go with the story," Bloomberg replied. "Our lawyers will love the fees you generate."

Winkler recalls this as his "deciding moment", the time at which he became willing to help Bloomberg build his news organization.

The publication was created to provide concise, timely financial news. As a new company in 1990, Bloomberg hoped that the news service would spread the company name, sell more Bloomberg Terminals and end Bloomberg's reliance on the Dow Jones News Services.

The creation of Bloomberg Business News required Winkler to open a Bloomberg office in Washington, D.C., to report political effects on the business world. However, the Standing Committee of Correspondents (SCC) in Washington required Bloomberg News to be formally accredited as a legitimate news source, a title that Bloomberg Business News only earned after agreeing to provide free terminals to major newspapers in exchange for news space in the publications. During this growth period, Bloomberg News opened a small television station in New York, purchased New York radio station WNEW, launched fifteen-minute weekday business news programs for broadcast on PBS, and opened offices in Hong Kong and Frankfurt, Germany.

=== 1995–2000 ===
The initial goal of Bloomberg Business News to increase terminal sales was met by the mid-1990s, and the company refocused the scope of its news service to rival the profitability of other media groups such as Reuters and Dow Jones. This led to the creation of Bloomberg's magazine, Bloomberg Personal, in 1995, which was carried in the Sunday edition of 18 U.S. papers. In 1994, Bloomberg launched a 24-hour financial news service through Bloomberg Information Television, which was broadcast on DirecTV. Bloomberg also launched a website to provide audio feeds of its radio broadcasts. Bloomberg Business News was renamed Bloomberg News in 1997.

=== 2000–2014 ===
In 2009 Bloomberg News and The Washington Post launched a global news service known as The Washington Post News Service with Bloomberg News, to provide economic and political news.

In April 2014, Bloomberg News launched the Bloomberg Luxury lifestyle section of its paper. The section's content covers topics including travel, wine news, dining, auto news, gadgets, technology news, and more. It also highlights content from Bloomberg's quarterly lifestyle and luxury magazine, Pursuits.

==== Business in China ====
In 2012, Bloomberg News published an investigative series titled "Revolution to Riches", which focused on China's political elite. The series won that year's George Polk Award for International Reporting. One story in the series delved into the family wealth of Chinese leader Xi Jinping. However, before publishing the Xi story, Bloomberg executives and senior editors met with Chinese diplomats twice, without informing the journalists working on the story. Zhang Yesui, the Chinese ambassador to the United States, reportedly threatened Bloomberg with consequences for its Chinese operations if it published the story. Bloomberg's editor-in-chief, Matthew Winkler, reportedly refused to stop the story from being published. Then-CEO Daniel Doctoroff also reportedly defended the investigation and insisted on publishing it, although he insisted on changes to soften the story's impact. After the story was published in June 2012, the Chinese government ordered state enterprises not to subscribe to Bloomberg News. The company's website was also blocked on Chinese servers, and it was unable to obtain visas for journalists it wanted to send to China.

The following year, Bloomberg shut down an ongoing investigation into the financial ties between a wealthy Chinese businessman and the families of top Chinese leaders. Another planned article, "about the children of senior Chinese officials employed by foreign banks," was also killed, according to Bloomberg employees. At least five journalists and editors, including the lead writer on the Xi story, left the company after news reports about the decision appeared. One of the journalists said Bloomberg had disparaged "the team that worked so hard to execute an incredibly demanding story" and claimed it threatened the journalists who worked on the story with legal action if they discussed the incident publicly.

Bloomberg's top editors, including the senior editor on the stories, Laurie Hays, and editor-in-chief Matthew Winkler, denied that the stories were killed. However, this was contradicted by several anonymous Bloomberg employees. According to one employee, Winkler had said, "If we run the story, we'll be kicked out of China." Michael Bloomberg, founder of the company, also denied the accusation, but noted that he had recused himself from the company's operations as he was mayor of New York.

After the incidents, Bloomberg set about repairing its relationship with the Chinese government. By 2015, Bloomberg's reporters began receiving visas again. Bloomberg Chairman Peter Grauer told the staff at the Bloomberg Hong Kong bureau that the company's sales team had done a "heroic job" of mending relations with Chinese officials who had indicated their displeasure about the publication of the Xi revelations. He also warned that if Bloomberg "were to do anything like" the Xi story again, the company would "be straight back in the shit-box."

Bloomberg was widely criticized for how it handled the controversy. Howard French, a professor of journalism, wrote that Bloomberg had "tainted its corporate identity and journalism brand to a degree that could last for years."

=== 2015 refocus ===
In 2015, an internal memo written by editor-in-chief John Micklethwait was leaked to the public. This memo indicated an intent to refocus the agency to better target its core audience, "the clever customer who is short of time", and better achieve the goal of being "the definitive 'chronicle of capitalism.'" This change led to a reduction in reporting on general interest topics in favor of content related to business and economics.

=== 2018 redesign and paywall ===
In 2018, Micklethwait announced a new digital design for Bloomberg News. Bloomberg uses a metered paywall to charge visitors for content, limiting users to 10 free articles per month with an unlimited re-read option, and to 30 minutes of Bloomberg Television per day, with a reset at local midnight.

In 2018, Bloomberg Businessweek, a subsidiary of Bloomberg News, published an article alleging that the Chinese government had hacked several American companies, including Apple Inc. and Amazon, by placing secret integrated circuits into their computers. Apple and Amazon strongly denied the report. The incident became a long-running dispute between Bloomberg, the U.S. Department of Homeland Security, and the U.K. National Cyber Security Centre, and both issued statements supporting the companies' denials of the story. In 2021, Bloomberg published a follow-up article standing by its allegations.

In 2016, Bloomberg published a news release claiming to be from Vinci SA, a French construction company, that it had discovered accounting irregularities and had to revise its earnings reports. The news release turned out to be a hoax. Vinci's stock briefly fell by 18% when Bloomberg published the report, but it quickly recovered once it became clear it was not true. In 2019, France's stock markets regulator, the Autorité des marchés financiers, fined Bloomberg €5 million for publishing the report, stating that it should have known it was false. An appeals court reduced the fine to €3 million in 2021.

=== Michael Bloomberg presidential campaign ===
In November 2019, as Michael Bloomberg announced his presidential campaign, editor-in-chief John Micklethwait ordered his staff not to investigate their boss, nor any other Democratic candidates, while investigations into Donald Trump would continue, "as the government of the day". Subsequent reporting said Micklethwait was referring to a team of specialized investigative reporters, as opposed to the overall political team, but he would not elaborate or issue a public clarification despite newsroom staff wishing for him to do so. Investigative journalists and political reporters operate separately, but reporting indicates this distinction would not be clear to the general public.

Following Bloomberg's announcement, the Houston Chronicle dropped Bloomberg as a source for the 2020 Presidential campaign, saying that "journalists should not choose targets based on their political affiliation." Former Bloomberg News DC Bureau Chief Megan Murphy also criticized the decision, saying it bars "talented reporters and editors from covering massive, crucial aspects of one of the defining elections of our time" and calling the decision to avoid coverage "not journalism". Responding to the controversy, Michael Bloomberg told CBS News: "We just have to learn to live with some things." He added that his reporters "get a paycheck. But with your paycheck comes some restrictions and responsibilities."

Bloomberg suspended his campaign on March 4, 2020, the day after Super Tuesday.

=== 2024 Russian prisoner exchange ===
While the 2024 Russian prisoner exchange was still in progress, Bloomberg News broke a news embargo by reporting information provided by the White House. Other publications, including the Wall Street Journal, criticized Bloomberg for breaking the embargo, potentially jeopardizing the exchange, and for a Bloomberg editor's apparent boasting about being the one to first publish a breaking news story.

== Bloomberg Businessweek ==
Bloomberg L.P. bought weekly business magazine Businessweek from McGraw-Hill in 2009. The company acquired the magazine to attract general business to its media audience composed primarily of terminal subscribers. Following the acquisition, Businessweek was renamed Bloomberg Businessweek. Bloomberg Businessweek became a part of Bloomberg News after the acquisition from Bloomberg L.P.

== Bloomberg Television ==
Bloomberg Television is a 24-hour financial news television network. It was introduced in 1994 as a subscription service transmitted on satellite television provider DirecTV, 13 hours a day, 7 days a week. In 1995, the network entered the cable television market and by 2000, Bloomberg's 24-hour news programming was being aired to 200 million households. Justin Smith is CEO of the Bloomberg Media Group which includes Bloomberg Radio, Bloomberg Television and mobile, online and advertising-supported components of Bloomberg's media offerings.

== Bloomberg Markets ==
Originally launched in July 1992 under the title Bloomberg: A Magazine for Bloomberg Users, Bloomberg Markets was a monthly magazine given to all Bloomberg Professional Service subscribers. In addition to providing international financial news to industry professionals, the magazine included points for navigating terminal functionality. In 2010, the magazine was redesigned in an effort to update its readership beyond terminal users. Ron Henkoff has been editor of Bloomberg Markets since 1999 and Michael Dukmejian has been the magazine's publisher since 2009.

== Bloomberg Opinion ==
Bloomberg Opinion, formerly Bloomberg View, is an editorial division of Bloomberg News which launched in May 2011, and provides content from columnists, authors and editors about current news issues. Timothy L. O'Brien, a former New York Times reporter and editor, is senior executive editor of the division.

Bloomberg Editor-in-Chief John Micklethwait admitted in an email to staffers that Michael Bloomberg controls the editorial output of the Opinion section, stating "our editorials have reflected his views". In 2015, Michael Bloomberg threatened to close Bloomberg View, part of the Bloomberg Opinion, after John Paulson, a billionaire hedge fund manager gave him a call. Paulson was upset about a column by Matt Levine that suggested his record-breaking donation to Harvard should have gone to "literally any other charity." Bloomberg changed his mind over the weekend, but the columnist was given a talking to, according to people familiar with the incident.

== Bloomberg Politics ==
Bloomberg Politics provides political coverage via digital, print and broadcast media. The multimedia venture, which debuted in October 2014, featured the daily television news program With All Due Respect, hosted by Bloomberg Politics Managing Editors Mark Halperin and John Heilemann. The program came to an end on December 2, 2016.

In 2016, Bloomberg Politics produced a documentary on the 2016 US presidential election called The Circus: Inside the Greatest Political Show on Earth.

As of 2024, Bloomberg Politics covers political events in the Americas, United Kingdom, Europe, Asia, and the Middle East. Bloomberg's section on U.S. politics primarily covers national news and American foreign policy.
