= Game Change (film) =

2012 television film directed by Jay Roach

- Television release poster
- Genre: Political drama
- Based on: Game Change by: Mark Halperin; John Heilemann
- Written by: Danny Strong
- Directed by: Jay Roach
- Starring: Julianne Moore; Woody Harrelson; Ed Harris
- Music by: Theodore Shapiro
- Country of origin: United States
- Original language: English

Production
- Executive producers: Tom Hanks; Gary Goetzman; Jay Roach
- Producer: Amy Sayres
- Cinematography: Jim Denault
- Editor: Lucia Zucchetti
- Running time: 118 minutes
- Production companies: HBO Films; Playtone

Original release
- Network: HBO
- Release: March 10, 2012

Game Change is a 2012 American political drama television film based on events of the 2008 United States presidential election campaign of John McCain, directed by Jay Roach and written by Danny Strong, based on the 2010 book of the same title documenting the campaign by political journalists Mark Halperin and John Heilemann. The film stars Julianne Moore, Woody Harrelson, and Ed Harris, and focuses on the chapters about the selection and performance of Governor of Alaska Sarah Palin (Moore) as running mate to Senator John McCain (Harris) in the presidential campaign.

The plot features a 2010 interview of the campaign's senior strategist Steve Schmidt (Harrelson), using flashbacks to portray McCain and Palin during their ultimately unsuccessful campaign. The film aired on HBO on March 10, 2012. It was well received by critics, with Moore's portrayal of Palin garnering praise. Schmidt praised the film, while Palin and McCain both stated they had no intention of seeing it. Alessandra Stanley of The New York Times described Moore's depiction of Palin as "a sharp-edged but not unsympathetic portrait of a flawed heroine, colored more in pity than in admiration." Game Change has earned many awards, including a Critics' Choice Television Award, a Directors Guild of America Award, a Golden Nymph Award, three Golden Globe Awards, a Producers Guild of America Award, five Primetime Emmy Awards, and a Writers Guild of America Award.

== Synopsis ==
The film opens in 2010 with a frame story: Republican strategist Steve Schmidt is being interviewed by Anderson Cooper for 60 Minutes. Cooper poses a difficult question regarding former vice presidential nominee Sarah Palin: was she selected because she would make the best vice president or because she would win the election?

The story flashes back to Senator John McCain's 2008 presidential campaign, which is struggling to compete with other Republican candidates during the primary season. McCain asks Schmidt to reconsider his promise to sit the election out. Months later, Schmidt is serving as McCain's senior campaign strategist, which culminates in McCain winning the Republican nomination.

McCain's preferred running mate, Senator Joe Lieberman, is rejected by Schmidt and the majority of his senior advisers. They quickly look for a "game change" candidate who will excite the conservative base, win over independents, distance the campaign from the Bush administration and close the gender gap. Investigating prominent female Republican politicians, the campaign finds Palin, the governor of Alaska, to have the qualities they want. She is selected after an exceptionally brief vetting process. Palin's eventual public reveal creates the buzz that Schmidt and McCain were looking for, bringing them to even or better with Obama in the polls.

While Palin's acceptance speech at the Republican National Convention is well received, the campaign becomes concerned that she is ignorant about many political issues and grossly unprepared. Schmidt handles controversies from her past, such as Troopergate and the Bridge to Nowhere, while other staff attempt to fill broad gaps in her understanding of domestic and foreign politics. While prepping for the interviews, she is preoccupied with her approval ratings in Alaska and the absence of her family while campaigning, eventually becoming unresponsive to advisers who begin to question her mental state. Her disastrous interview with Katie Couric becomes a source of mockery in the media and frustration in the campaign. Palin lashes out at Nicolle Wallace, claiming that it was a deliberate attempt to embarrass her. Wallace tells Schmidt she is done with Palin.

The staff also comes to accept that Palin is better at memorizing and delivering lines than she is at actually understanding issues. Thus, they grudgingly prepare her for the vice presidential debate by simply having Palin memorize about forty minutes' worth of talking points, which manages to get her through the debate without major incident. However, Palin's growing popularity with the Republican base, even as she alienates mainstream voters, soon overshadows the campaign; Palin becomes uncooperative, rejecting – and conflicting with – Schmidt and the rest of the campaign staff, touting her own following as making her more important than McCain. Later on, with prospects appearing poor, the campaign staff boosts a negative campaign against Obama's past associations with the liberal elite, which Palin supports but McCain resists. McCain, meanwhile, becomes discouraged by the negative campaigning, watching growing hostility and vitriol emerge toward Obama among McCain's supporters. With Election Day approaching, senior campaigners express regret that Palin turned out to be style without substance, with Schmidt lamenting that they neglected to vet her competency. McCain consoles Schmidt by reaffirming that taking a risk with Palin was better than fading away.

Obama wins by more than double the electoral college vote; on Election Night, Schmidt has to stop a rebellious Palin from giving a concession speech along with McCain's. She appeals to McCain, who agrees with Schmidt. He tells Palin that she is now one of the party leaders and warns her not to let herself be hijacked by extremism. Rick Davis (McCain's campaign manager) comments that Palin will soon be forgotten. During McCain's concession speech, he thanks Palin, who receives enormous and sustained applause, chants, and enthusiasm from the crowd, which is noted in the faces of McCain's advisors. The film returns to the 2010 interview; regarding Cooper's question about whether he would pick Palin again if he had the chance to go back, Schmidt replies that life does not give do-overs.

== Cast ==
- Julianne Moore as Sarah Palin, Governor of Alaska
- Woody Harrelson as Steve Schmidt, Senior Campaign Strategist
- Ed Harris as John McCain, U.S. Senator from Arizona
- Ron Livingston as Mark Wallace, Senior Adviser
- Peter MacNicol as Rick Davis, Campaign Manager
- Sarah Paulson as Nicolle Wallace, Director of Communications
- Jamey Sheridan as Mark Salter, Senior Adviser and Speechwriter
- Bruce Altman as Fred Davis, Chief Media Strategist
- Colby French as Tucker Eskew, Senior Media Adviser
- Spencer Garrett as Steve Biegun, Foreign Policy Adviser
- David Barry Gray as Todd Palin, Sarah's husband
- Brian Howe as Randy Scheunemann, Foreign Policy Adviser
- Austin Pendleton as Joe Lieberman, U.S. Senator from Connecticut
- John Rothman as Arthur B. Culvahouse, Jr., Vetting Attorney

The authors of the book Game Change, Mark Halperin and John Heilemann, appear in a cameo as two reporters questioning Schmidt. Actual footage from the 2008 campaign portrayed the Democratic candidates Barack Obama and Joe Biden as well as numerous reporters, including Anderson Cooper, Katie Couric, Wolf Blitzer, Candy Crowley, Charles Gibson, and John King. At times, the film employed doubles and editing to make it appear that the actors are interacting with historical footage, such as in the presidential debate scenes featuring the real Obama, the real Wolf Blitzer, and Harris as McCain.

== Production ==
HBO optioned the book Game Change, by John Heilemann and Mark Halperin, in January 2010. In February 2011, development began with Danny Strong writing and Jay Roach directing. The two had collaborated as writer and director on the 2008 HBO film Recount, about the controversial result of the 2000 U.S. presidential election. Although Strong and Roach based the film on the part of the book dealing with the McCain–Palin campaign, they had also considered a film dealing with Obama's primary battle against Hillary Clinton – an idea ultimately dropped due to the length and complexity of that story, among other reasons. Strong said he interviewed 25 people from the McCain–Palin campaign and referenced other books and articles, including Palin's memoir Going Rogue, in addition to the book on which the film was based.

The main cast was announced in March 2011, starting with Julianne Moore as Palin, Ed Harris as John McCain, with Woody Harrelson, who plays McCain campaign chair Steve Schmidt, coming aboard soon thereafter. The film was primarily shot in Maryland, along with a hotel scene shot in Wilmington, Delaware. The film was also shot and produced in Albuquerque and Santa Fe, New Mexico. The film premiered at the Newseum in Washington, D.C., on March 8 prior to its public debut on HBO on March 10, 2012. Principal photography began on April 27, 2011, and completed shooting on June 22, 2011.

== Reception ==
=== Ratings ===
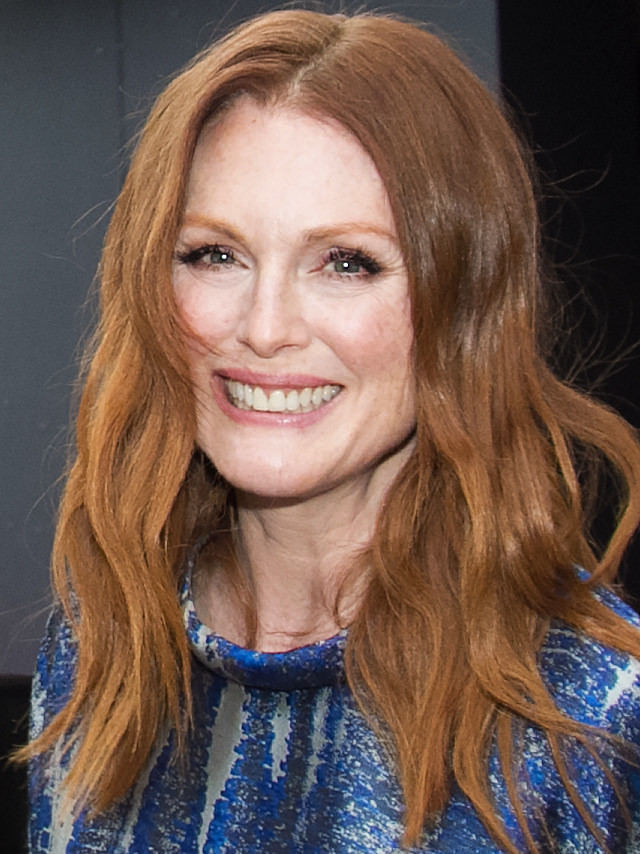
Moore's performance was met with critical acclaim, winning a Primetime Emmy Award for Outstanding Lead Actress in a Miniseries or Movie.

Game Change was watched by 2.1 million people on its debut night, which marked the highest ratings for an HBO original film since their 2004 film Something the Lord Made.

=== Reviews ===
Game Change received generally positive reviews, with 65% of the critics polled by Rotten Tomatoes giving it favorable reviews (based on 37 reviews), with an averaged score of 6.9 out of 10. Metacritic lists the film as scoring 74 out of 100, based on 25 reviews by critics, signifying a "generally favorable" critical response.

David Hinckley of The New York Daily News wrote, "Julianne Moore's physical Palin in Game Change, which debuts March 10, is even more dead-on than Tina Fey's." Fey, who was noted for her physical resemblance to Palin, won a Primetime Emmy Award for Outstanding Guest Actress in a Comedy Series in 2009 for her satirical impersonation of Palin on the sketch comedy TV show Saturday Night Live. Several excerpts from these impersonations were used in the film.

The Hollywood Reporter's Tim Goodman wrote that the movie "boldly raises the question about whether Palin is mentally unbalanced." He called Moore's performance "virtuoso (and likely Emmy-winning)." Roger Ebert gave the movie three and a half stars. Entertainment Weekly's Ken Tucker gave it an A−.

The Los Angeles Times wrote: "The overall atmosphere of the film is surprisingly kind to all, much more fatalistic than hypercritical and certainly not derisive. Palin's rise and fall is depicted as series of bad decisions made in relatively good faith that lead up to a hideous car crash." Newsday commented: "Moore's performance ... is superb. ... A luminous and fully alive portrait by a first-rate actress." The San Francisco Chronicle also praised the acting: "Game Change is graced by three extraordinary performances in the leading roles, beginning with Moore's portrayal of Palin, which is both complex and entirely credible." The Boston Globe wrote: "Whether “Game Change’’ is a definitive accounting of what happened, and whether some viewers will accept it as such is unknowable. But from a dramatic standpoint is the film entertaining? You betcha."

=== Response from the McCain campaign ===
Palin herself said Game Change was based on a "false narrative" and that she did not intend to see it. The film, and the book it is based upon, have been described by John and Cindy McCain as inaccurate. Like Palin, McCain said he did not intend to see it, and took issue with the "exceeding amount of coarse language" that was attributed to him in the film. Many of Sarah Palin's campaign aides have criticized the accuracy of the film. Randy Scheunemann, who tutored Palin on foreign policy matters during the campaign, said: "To call this movie fiction gives fiction a bad name." According to her campaign staff, many had not been contacted by the filmmakers or the authors of the book on which it is based.

However, Steve Schmidt, the campaign's chief strategist, stated: "Ten weeks of the campaign are condensed into a two-hour movie. But it tells the truth of the campaign. That is the story of what happened." He later said that watching the film was tantamount to "an out-of-body experience."

Nicolle Wallace, a chief Palin 2008 aide, said she found Game Change highly credible, saying the film "captured the spirit and emotion of the campaign." Wallace also told ABC News Chief Political Correspondent George Stephanopoulos that the film was "true enough to make me squirm." Both Wallace and Schmidt have had public feuds with Sarah Palin since the 2008 campaign ended.

Melissa Farman, who played Bristol Palin, said it was never the film's intention to portray Sarah Palin in a negative light because the film was not meant to be about Palin, but about "politics at large" and what it means to be a politician in this era.

== Accolades ==
Year	Award	Category	Nominee(s)	Result	Ref.
2012	Artios Awards	Outstanding Achievement in Casting – Television Movie/Mini Series	David Rubin, Richard Hicks, Pat Moran, Kathleen Chopin, and Anne Davison	Nominated	
2012	Critics' Choice Television Awards	Best Movie/Miniseries		Nominated	
2012	Critics' Choice Television Awards	Best Actor in a Movie/Miniseries	Woody Harrelson	Nominated	
2012	Critics' Choice Television Awards	Best Actress in a Movie/Miniseries	Julianne Moore	Won	
2012	Golden Nymph Awards	Best Television Film		Nominated	
2012	Golden Nymph Awards	Best Direction	Jay Roach	Nominated	
2012	Golden Nymph Awards	Outstanding Actor	Woody Harrelson	Won	
2012	Golden Nymph Awards	Outstanding Actor	Ed Harris	Nominated	
2012	Golden Nymph Awards	Outstanding Actress	Julianne Moore	Nominated	
2012	Primetime Emmy Awards	Outstanding Television Movie	Tom Hanks, Gary Goetzman, Jay Roach, Danny Strong, Steven Shareshian, and Amy Sayres	Won	
2012	Primetime Emmy Awards	Outstanding Lead Actor in a Miniseries or a Movie	Woody Harrelson	Nominated	
2012	Primetime Emmy Awards	Outstanding Lead Actress in a Miniseries or Movie	Julianne Moore	Won	
2012	Primetime Emmy Awards	Outstanding Supporting Actor in a Miniseries or Movie	Ed Harris	Nominated	
2012	Primetime Emmy Awards	Outstanding Supporting Actress in a Miniseries or Movie	Sarah Paulson	Nominated	
2012	Primetime Emmy Awards	Outstanding Directing for a Miniseries, Movie or Dramatic Special	Jay Roach	Won	
2012	Primetime Emmy Awards	Outstanding Writing for a Miniseries, Movie or Dramatic Special	Danny Strong	Won	
2012	Primetime Creative Arts Emmy Awards	Outstanding Casting for a Miniseries, Movie, or Special	David Rubin, Richard Hicks, Pat Moran, and Kathleen Chopin	Won	
2012	Primetime Creative Arts Emmy Awards	Outstanding Cinematography for a Miniseries or Movie	Jim Denault	Nominated	
2012	Primetime Creative Arts Emmy Awards	Outstanding Music Composition for a Miniseries, Movie or a Special (Original Dramatic Score)	Theodore Shapiro	Nominated	
2012	Primetime Creative Arts Emmy Awards	Outstanding Single-Camera Picture Editing for a Miniseries or Movie	Lucia Zucchetti	Nominated	
2012	Primetime Creative Arts Emmy Awards	Outstanding Sound Mixing for a Miniseries or a Movie	David MacMillan, Leslie Shatz, and Gabriel J. Serrano	Nominated	
2012	Satellite Awards	Miniseries or Motion Picture Made for Television		Nominated	
2012	Satellite Awards	Best Actor in a Miniseries or a Motion Picture Made for Television	Woody Harrelson	Nominated	
2012	Satellite Awards	Best Actress in a Miniseries or a Motion Picture Made for Television	Julianne Moore	Won	
2012	Satellite Awards	Best Actress in a Supporting Role in a Series, Miniseries or Motion Picture Made for Television	Sarah Paulson	Nominated	
2012	Television Critics Association Awards	Outstanding Achievement in Movies, Miniseries, and Specials		Nominated	
2012	Women's Image Network Awards	Made for Television Movie		Won	
2012	Women's Image Network Awards	Actress Made for Television Movie	Julianne Moore	Nominated	
2013	American Cinema Editors Awards	Best Edited Miniseries or Motion Picture for Television	Lucia Zucchetti	Nominated	
2013	American Film Institute Awards	Top 10 Television Programs		Won	
2013	Art Directors Guild Awards	Excellence in Production Design Award – Television Movie or Miniseries	Michael Corenblith, Samantha Avila, Kuo Pao Lian, Kenneth Roman, Francesca Gerlach, and Tiffany Zappulla	Nominated	
2013	Cinema Audio Society Awards	Outstanding Achievement in Sound Mixing for Television Movies and Mini-Series	David MacMillan, Gabriel J. Serrano, Leslie Shatz, Chris Fogel, Travis MacKay, and Tor McAfee Kingdon	Nominated	
2013	Directors Guild of America Awards	Outstanding Directorial Achievement in Movies for Television and Miniseries	Jay Roach	Won	
2013	Dorian Awards	TV Performance of the Year – Actress	Julianne Moore	Nominated	
2013	Golden Globe Awards	Best Miniseries or Television Film		Won	
2013	Golden Globe Awards	Best Actor in a Miniseries or Television Film	Woody Harrelson	Nominated	
2013	Golden Globe Awards	Best Actress in a Miniseries or Television Film	Julianne Moore	Won	
2013	Golden Globe Awards	Best Supporting Actor in a Series, Miniseries or Television Film	Ed Harris	Won	
2013	Golden Globe Awards	Best Supporting Actress in a Series, Miniseries or Television Film	Sarah Paulson	Nominated	
2013	Gracie Awards	Outstanding Female Actor in a Leading Role in a Drama Special	Julianne Moore	Won	
2013	Guild of Music Supervisors Awards	Best Music Supervision – TV Long Form (Movies and Mini-Series)	Evyen Klean and Deva Anderson	Won	
2013	Peabody Awards		Playtone Productions and Everyman Pictures, in association with HBO Films	Won	
2013	Producers Guild of America Awards	David L. Wolper Award for Outstanding Producer of Long-Form Television	Gary Goetzman, Tom Hanks, Jay Roach, Amy Sayres, Steven Shareshian, and Danny Strong	Won	
2013	Screen Actors Guild Awards	Outstanding Performance by a Male Actor in a Miniseries or Television Movie	Woody Harrelson	Nominated	
2013	Screen Actors Guild Awards	Outstanding Performance by a Male Actor in a Miniseries or Television Movie	Ed Harris	Nominated	
2013	Screen Actors Guild Awards	Outstanding Performance by a Female Actor in a Miniseries or Television Movie	Julianne Moore	Won	
2013	Writers Guild of America Awards	Long Form – Adapted	Danny Strong; Based on the book by Mark Halperin and John Heilemann	Won	
