= Mark McKinnon =

American political consultant

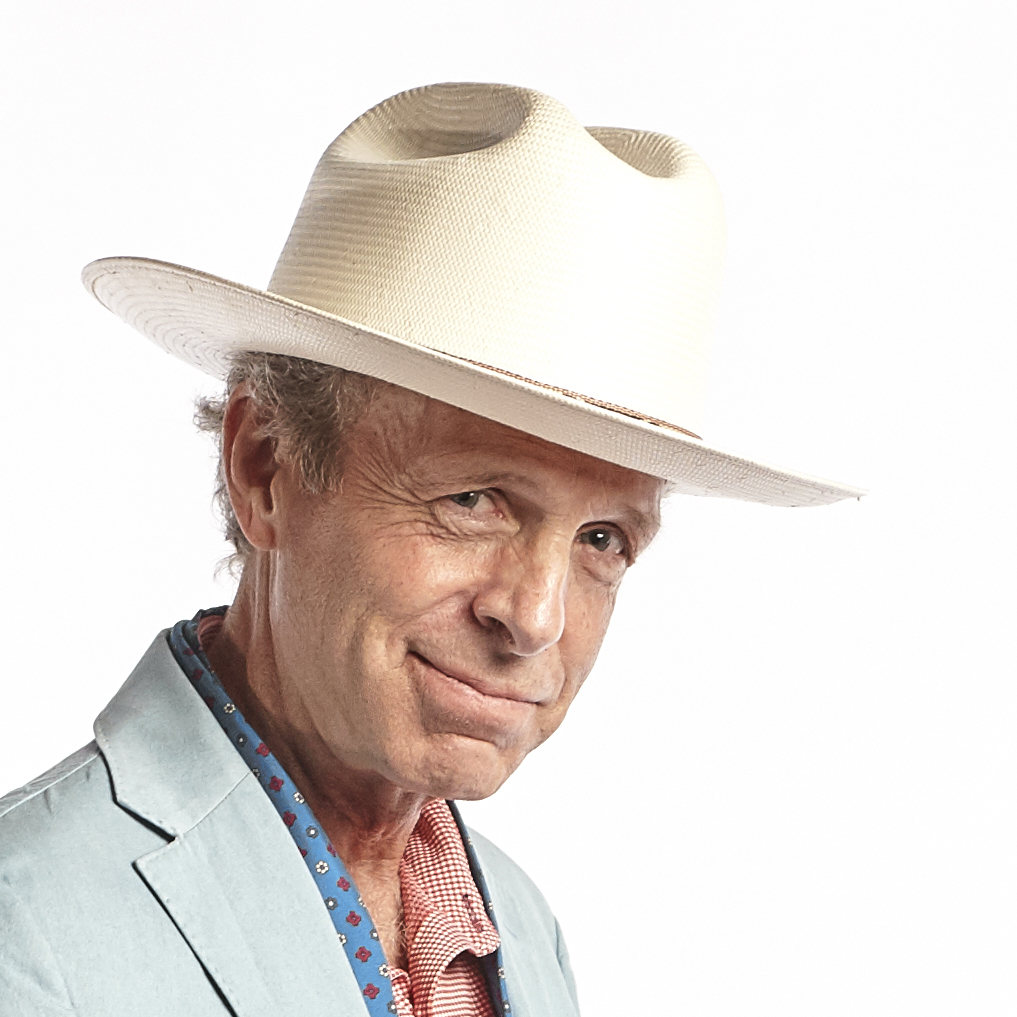

Member of the Broadcasting Board of Governors
- In office January 4, 2007 – December 31, 2007; Recess appointment
- Appointed by: George W. Bush
- Preceded by: Veronique Rodman
- Succeeded by: Michael Lynton

Personal details
- Born: Mark David McKinnon; May 5, 1955 (age 71) Boulder, Colorado, U.S.
- Party: Democratic (until 1998); Republican (1998-present)
- Spouse: Annie Miller
- Children: 2
- Education: University of Texas at Austin
- Occupation: Political consultant; columnist; television producer

Mark David McKinnon (born May 5, 1955) is an American political advisor, reform advocate, media columnist, and television producer. He was the chief media advisor to five successful presidential primary and general election campaigns, and is a co-founder of No Labels, an organization dedicated to bipartisanship and political problem solving. He served as vice chairman of Public Strategies, Inc., which was acquired by the international communications consultancy Hill & Knowlton Strategies, and was president of Maverick Media. McKinnon is the co-creator, co-executive producer, and co-host of Showtime's The Circus: Inside the Greatest Political Show on Earth and consulted on the HBO series The Newsroom and Netflix's House of Cards. He was a regular columnist for The Daily Beast and The Daily Telegraph (London).

McKinnon has worked for many causes, companies and candidates, including former president George W. Bush, Senator John McCain, Texas governor Ann Richards, Congressman Charlie Wilson, and musician and philanthropist Bono. He has served on the boards of numerous organizations dedicated to reforming the influence of money in politics. McKinnon was on the advisory board of Americans Elect, a defunct political organization known primarily for its efforts to stage a national online primary for the 2012 United States presidential election. In 2014, McKinnon launched Mayday PAC to force ethics reform in the United States Congress, along with Harvard Professor Larry Lessig—who would later run for president on a related push for ethics and campaign finance reform—and tech moguls Steve Wozniak, Fred Wilson, Peter Thiel, and Reid Hoffman. McKinnon and Julian Castro served as co-chairs of Southerners for the Freedom to Marry, before Obergefell v. Hodges affirmed that the fundamental right to marry is guaranteed to same-sex couples. He currently serves on the boards of Take Back Our Republic and the Austin Film Society, and is a member of the George Foster Peabody Awards board of jurors as well as the Advisory Council of Represent.Us, a nonpartisan anti-corruption organization.

== Career ==
=== Early career ===
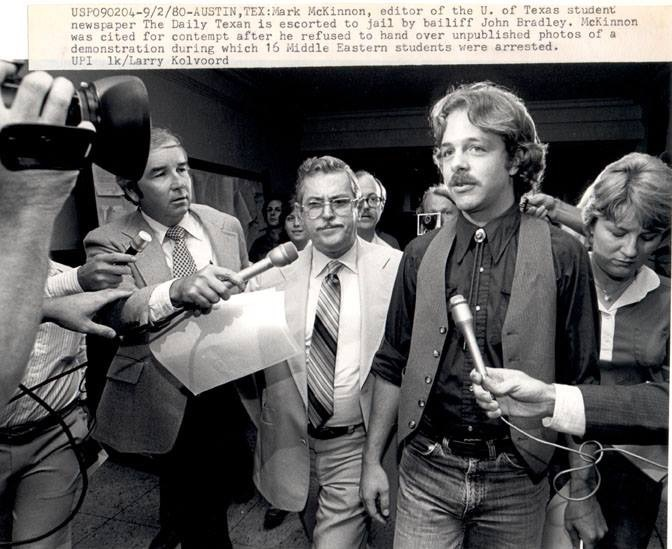
McKinnon being arrested for refusing to provide photographs of an Iranian student protest to police, 1980

Mark McKinnon was born in Boulder, Colorado, and was raised in Denver. He performed in a band called Daybreak and, following his junior year, dropped out of high school and hitchhiked to Nashville, Tennessee. There he began his career as a songwriter and worked alongside Kris Kristofferson. McKinnon returned to Denver to complete high school, then made his way back to Nashville to continue pursuing music. He was named the "New Folk" winner at the 1975 Kerrville Folk Festival.

In 1976, McKinnon moved to Austin, Texas, where he earned a living as a musician. McKinnon enrolled at the University of Texas at Austin and served as editor of the student newspaper The Daily Texan during 1980–1981. While working for the newspaper, he was jailed briefly on a First Amendment issue after refusing to provide to police unpublished photographs of an Iranian student protest. During this period he also investigated Child prostitution rings he alleged operated within Texas, discussing his findings on the public access TV show, Alternative Views. He left the university before completing his undergraduate work.

=== Democratic campaigns ===
McKinnon's first political campaign experience was volunteering for then Texas State Senator Lloyd Doggett's 1984 U.S. Senate campaign, where he worked with James Carville and Paul Begala, who promoted McKinnon to the role of press secretary. McKinnon then worked for former Texas Governor Mark White during his 1985–1986 re-election campaign, followed by former Louisiana Governor Buddy Roemer's campaign in 1987. In the late-1980s, he went to work for the New York-based international political media consulting company Sawyer Miller Group.

After returning to Texas, McKinnon joined the firm Public Strategies, Inc. in 1990, serving as its vice chairman beginning in 1991. He spent the next several years working on many Texas Democratic winning campaigns, including those of Governor Ann Richards (1990), former Houston Mayor Bob Lanier (2001), and the Congressman Charlie Wilson. In 1994, McKinnon worked on Bob Bullock's re-election campaign for Lieutenant Governor of Texas. In 1996, he announced that he was shifting gears and leaving partisan politics. In his Texas Monthly article entitled "The Spin Doctor Is Out", McKinnon wrote that he "won't miss desperate candidates, manic campaign managers and last-minute attack and response ads".

=== Work for George W. Bush ===
McKinnon returned to politics after meeting then Governor George W. Bush at a dinner at the governor's mansion. Following this encounter, McKinnon and Bush developed a personal relationship. According to Karl Rove, "Bush and McKinnon clicked from moment one. In a bow to McKinnon's cool image, Bush dubbed him 'M-Kat.'" Of his relationship with Bush, McKinnon said, "We had a personal relationship before we had a professional relationship. And when Texas' Democratic lieutenant governor Bob Bullock endorsed Bush over the Democratic gubernatorial nominee — his own god-son — well that's when I crossed the bridge. But it was not an easy decision."

During a Frontline interview describing the former president's ascendance into the national political arena, McKinnon said, "Governor Bush was doing some things that really got my attention. He was talking about education reform. He was talking about immigration reform. He was talking about issues that had typically been Democratic issues. He was talking about them in a really compassionate way." McKinnon said that he was particularly "impressed with how he'd gotten ahead of the Republican Party".

After being recommended to Bush by Bullock, McKinnon led the advertising and media team for Bush's gubernatorial campaign in 1998. That same year, he became president of Maverick Media, which was created for the purpose of electing Bush as president. He worked on Bush's first presidential campaign as the chief media advisor, directing the advertising effort in 2000, a role he would reprise in the 2004 elections. President Bush appointed McKinnon to serve as a member of the Broadcasting Board of Governors, the independent, autonomous entity responsible for all U.S. government sponsored, non-military, international broadcasting.

=== Work for John McCain ===
McKinnon began serving as the principal media advisor for Senator McCain's presidential bid for the Republican primaries in January, 2007, but decided to leave the campaign on May 21, 2008. Explaining his decision, McKinnon said that he preferred not to campaign against Illinois Senator Barack Obama, the presumptive Democratic Party nominee for president because Obama's election "would send a great message to the country and the world." In leaving his advisory role, McKinnon said he preferred to be a "fan, friend, and cheerleader" for McCain's campaign, but preferred not to be the "tip of the spear in attacking him [Obama]."

On August 27, 2008, the Dallas Morning News reported that McKinnon helped Cindy McCain in her preparation for her GOP convention speech. At this time McKinnon clarified that he was not returning to his role as media advisor to the McCain campaign, but that he was instead helping the McCains out of his "friendship" to them. According to Rory O'Connor from The Huffington Post, McKinnon felt that he was keeping true to his pledge in not attacking Obama by only "acting as a facilitator to help with Cindy's speech. That means helping to identify speechwriters, Mari Will and Lionel Chetwynd, and working with them and Cindy on the speech." O'Connor also noted that McKinnon said that he was not helping the McCain campaign with advertising.

Although it was also reported by Vanity Fair that McKinnon had returned to the McCain campaign to prepare Sarah Palin for the United States vice-presidential debate, 2008, in their book Game Change (2010), journalists John Heilemann and Mark Halperin suggest that McKinnon was extremely reluctant to help coach Palin for the debate. According to the duo, "(Rick) Davis had pleaded with Mark McKinnon, who had decided to sit out the general election because he wanted no part of flaying Obama, to ride to their rescue; he agreed, but just for that one night." In Game Change, it is reported that McKinnon was not impressed with Palin's performance during the run-through before the debate. When one of McCain's campaign advisors asked him what he thought about Palin's practice runs, McKinnon replied "Oh.My.God."

=== Media career and political reform efforts ===
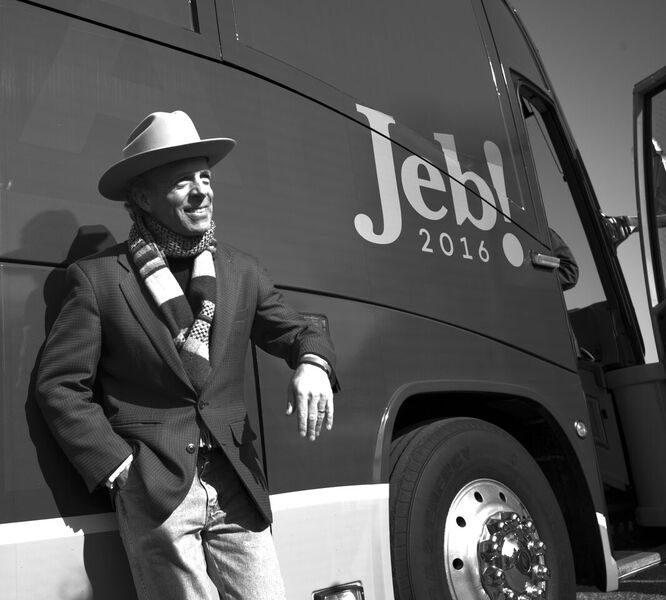
McKinnon in front of a Jeb Bush bus

McKinnon developed the show concept, co-created, co-hosts, and serves as co-executive producer of Showtime's real-time political documentary series, The Circus: Inside the Greatest Political Show on Earth. He also served as a consultant for the political drama television series, The Newsroom (HBO) and House of Cards (Netflix). McKinnon has been a regular columnist for The Daily Beast and The Daily Telegraph (London).

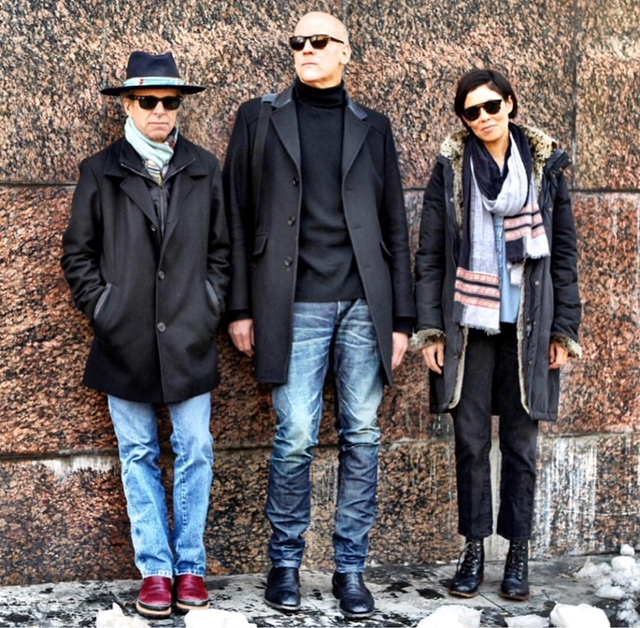
Mark McKinnon, John Heilemann, and Alex Wagner (left to right) of the Showtime series The Circus

He was a fellow at the John F. Kennedy School of Government at Harvard University's Shorenstein Center on Media, Politics and Public Policy (2007, 2011) and the Harvard Institute of Politics (2012). In addition to Harvard, McKinnon has lectured at the Lyndon B. Johnson School of Public Affairs at the University of Texas at Austin. He currently serves on the advisory board for the Austin Film Society.

McKinnon has also dedicated much effort toward political reform. He is a co-founder of the bi-partisan organization No Labels, which advocates nonpartisan solutions to political and social problems. He has served on the boards of non-profit organizations countering the influence of money in politics, including CounterPAC, Mayday PAC, and Take Back Our Republic. He co-chaired for Arts+Labs and served on the boards of the Livestrong Foundation and Change Congress, an organization dedicated to campaign finance reform. Following Lance Armstrong's admission to doping, McKinnon felt "betrayed" by Armstrong and supported the board's effort to distance the organization from its founder.

McKinnon helped lead the effort to overturn the United States' same-sex marriage ban by serving as co-chair of Southerners for the Freedom to Marry, alongside Julian Castro. In 2013, he was a signatory to an amicus curiae brief submitted to the Supreme Court in support of same-sex marriage during the Hollingsworth v. Perry case.

== Personal life ==
McKinnon is a two-time Ironman Triathlon finisher and an avid bicyclist. He has a tattoo on his right arm of the number "40," in remembrance of the NFL football player and US soldier, Pat Tillman, who was killed by friendly fire in Afghanistan. He met his wife Annie before he could drive; they now have two grown daughters.
