= Download (disambiguation) =

Download is transferring a file to or from another computer.

Download may also refer to:

== Computing ==
- File sharing, the uploading and downloading of files over a distributed peer network
- Music download, the transferral of music from an Internet-facing computer or website to a user's local desktop computer
- Download.com, the world's largest Internet download directory website
- Download!, a former Nokia application store

== Music ==
- Download (band), a band with Cevin Key and Phil Western
- "Download" (song), a 2009 song by rapper Lil' Kim
- Download Festival, a British rock festival
- "Download", a Super Furry Animals song from Radiator, 1997

== Film and television ==
- Downloaded (film), a 2013 documentary film
- Download (TV series), an Australian television series
- Download (game show), a 2000–2002 Australian children's game show for Nine Network
- Download The True Story of the Internet, a documentary television series about Internet history
- Downloaded (Battlestar Galactica), a 2006 Battlestar Galactica Season 2 episode

== Other uses ==
- Download (video game), a PC Engine title
- Decommissioned highway, when a highway is "downloaded" to a municipality as a local road
