= Double Down: Game Change 2012 =

2013 book by John Heilemann and Mark Halperin

- Author: John Heilemann and Mark Halperin
- Language: English
- Subject: 2012 United States presidential election
- Genre: Non-fiction
- Publisher: Penguin Press
- Publication date: November 5, 2013
- Publication place: United States
- Media type: Print
- Pages: 476
- ISBN: 978-1594204401
- Preceded by: Game Change

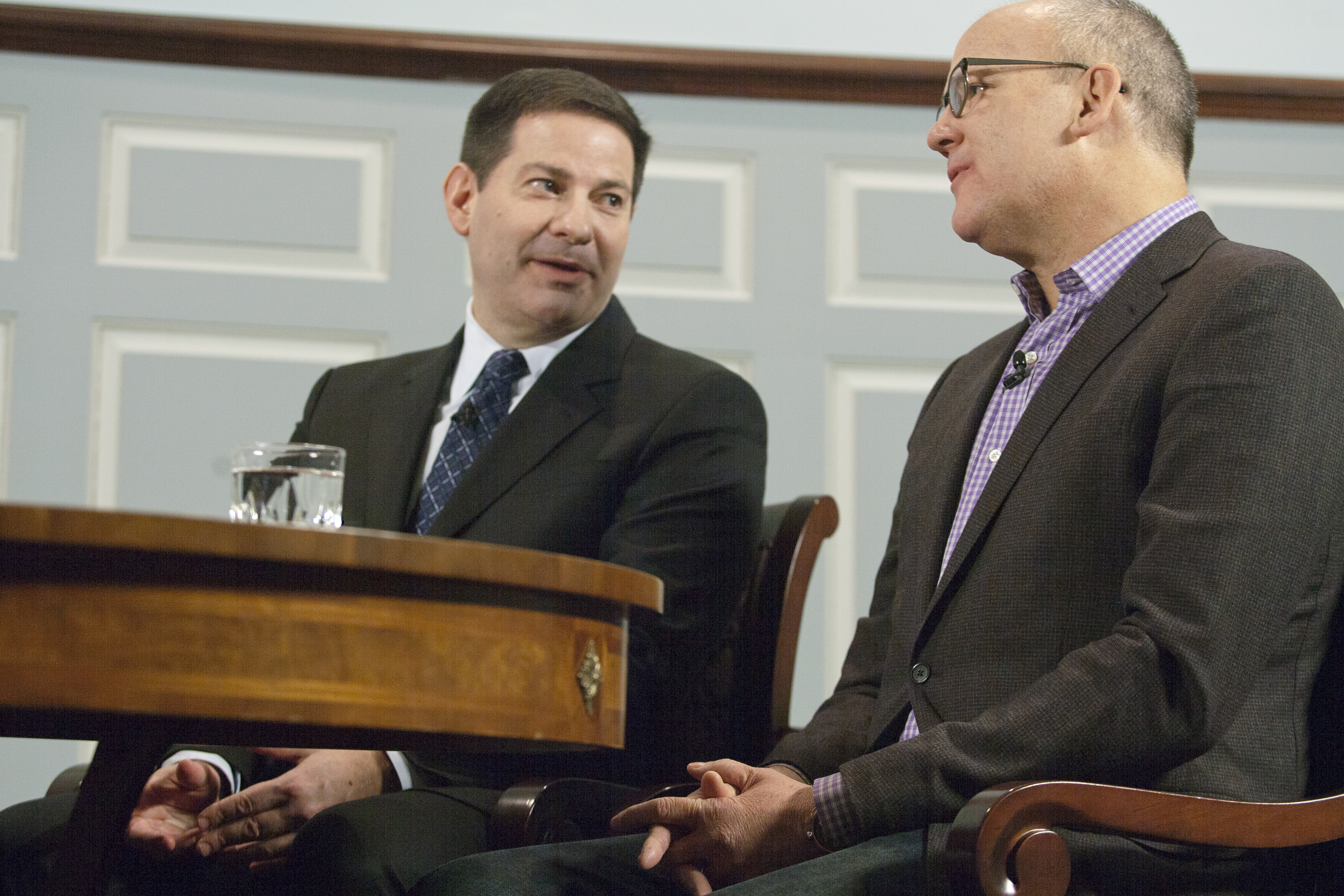
Mark Halperin and John Heilemann speaking about book at the Miller Center, January 8, 2014

Double Down: Game Change 2012 is a book written by political journalists John Heilemann and Mark Halperin about the 2012 United States presidential election, in which Barack Obama was re-elected as President of the United States, defeating Mitt Romney. The book, published by Penguin Press, is a behind-the-scenes narrative of the Obama and Romney campaigns. It is the sequel to Game Change, which chronicled the 2008 United States presidential election. Double Down was released on November 5, 2013.

== Contents ==
Following the success of Game Change, and its film adaptation, Penguin Press gave Mark Halperin and John Heilemann a $5 million advance payment in 2010 to write a book on the 2012 presidential election. As they did for Game Change, Halperin and Heilemann conducted in-depth interviews with the candidates, their aides, and members of the Washington, D.C. political establishment. The book relies on over 400 sources, most of whom are anonymous. The authors treated their interview subjects with alcohol in a private suite or restaurant to get them to open up.

According to the authors, senior advisers to Obama advocated replacing Joe Biden as nominee for Vice President of the United States with Hillary Clinton. William M. Daley, Obama's former White House Chief of Staff, acknowledged that the Obama team considered proposing to the President a plan to switch running mates, but opted not to do so when they determined it would not provide an advantage. The Obama campaign was also frustrated with former President Bill Clinton, for his compliments on Romney's business career, and Newark mayor Cory Booker, who said that criticisms of Romney's business career were "nauseating".

The book provides an account of the Republican presidential primaries and the campaign woes of each candidate, including Romney's struggles to connect with voters and his own puzzlement as to why his wealth and lifestyle would foster this disconnect. Amongst Romney's challengers, the various factors keeping Mike Huckabee, Mitch Daniels, Donald Trump, and Jeb Bush from running are discussed, with Karl Rove's prominent role revealed.

The book reveals Rep. Michele Bachmann's belief that as a "brainier" Sarah Palin she could win the nomination, only to suffer horrible stage fright and a series of gaffes; Herman Cain's initial appeal deflated by charges of sexual harassment and a poor understanding of U.S. foreign policy; Jon Huntsman, Jr.'s highly anticipated campaign's failing to catch on due to poor organization and attacks by both the Romney campaign and the Obama White House, each viewing the ambassador as a turncoat; and Gov. Rick Perry's gaffe-ridden campaign, apparently made worse by painkiller use. Romney's personal feuding with Perry, Newt Gingrich and Rick Santorum occupies a large portion of the story, including allegations that the Romney campaign had fostered rumors regarding Gingrich's request for an "open marriage" with his second wife shortly before divorcing her for his mistress, and the revelation that Santorum had brought a stillborn son home for his family to see.

The authors write that Romney decided not to choose Chris Christie as his running-mate, in part due unanswered questions through the vetting process about a defamation lawsuit and a Securities and Exchange Commission investigation, as well as his weight. Christie and the Romney campaign later quarreled with each other, including an argument with a Romney adviser at the 2012 Republican National Convention.

During the campaign, Harry Reid, the Senate Majority Leader, stated that a Republican source who invested in Bain Capital, Romney's financial services company, informed him that Romney had not paid taxes in ten years. In the book, Heilemann and Halperin attribute this to Jon Huntsman, Sr., who had previously denied being Reid's source.

== Reception ==
Writing for The Washington Post, Peter Hamby said "the book lacks the made-for-Hollywood scenes of "Game Change", but "there’s still click-bait aplenty". Ezra Klein wrote for Bloomberg that the book "is a joyous romp through the seedy underbelly of presidential campaigning". Michael Kinsley wrote for The New York Times that Double Down "may be the first political book ever with more excrement than sex".

Prominent individuals mentioned in the book have responded publicly about its contents. Discussing the book's claim, Huntsman, Sr. again denied being Reid's source, calling the claim "supermarket tabloid trash." Christie indicated that Romney called him to apologize about the leaks from his campaign. When responding to claims about incomplete vetting reports, he dismissed the criticism as "part of the parlor game of Washington D.C.", and said that "political advice from people who ran the Romney campaign is probably something nobody should really give a darn about". Regarding the possibility of swapping Biden for Clinton as his running mate, Obama told Chuck Todd of NBC News that "if they had asked me, I would have said there is no way that I am not running again with Joe Biden".

== Film adaptation ==
HBO Films, which produced Game Change, the film version of the book, optioned the rights to Double Down. When asked about casting, Halperin suggested Will Smith or Giancarlo Esposito would be his choices for Obama, while George Clooney or Jon Hamm could play Romney.
