= Morton Halperin =

American civil liberties and foreign policy expert (born 1938)

20th Director of Policy Planning
- In office September 16, 1998 – January 20, 2001
- President: Bill Clinton
- Preceded by: Gregory B. Craig
- Succeeded by: Richard N. Haass

Personal details
- Born: June 13, 1938 (age 88) Brooklyn, New York, U.S.
- Spouse(s): Ina Weinstein (divorced); Carol Pitchersky; Diane Orentlicher
- Children: with Weinstein: David Halperin; Gary Halperin; Mark Halperin
- Education: Columbia University (BA); Yale University (PhD)
- Occupation: Foreign policy analyst

Morton H. Halperin (born June 13, 1938) is an American analyst who deals with U.S. foreign policy, arms control, civil liberties, and the workings of bureaucracies.

Halperin served in the Johnson, Nixon, Clinton, and Obama administrations. He has taught at Harvard University and as a visitor at other universities including Columbia, George Washington University, and Yale.

Halperin has served in a number of roles with think tanks, including the Center for American Progress, Carnegie Endowment for International Peace, the Council on Foreign Relations, and the Twentieth Century Fund. He was also a senior advisor to the Open Society Foundations.

== Early career ==
Halperin was born to a Jewish family on June 13, 1938, in Brooklyn, New York. He graduated from Lafayette High School in Brooklyn and received his BA in political science from Columbia University in 1958. Thereafter, he attended Yale University, where he received an MA in international relations in 1959 and a PhD in the discipline in 1961.

Halperin has three sons, including Mark Halperin. His second wife, Carol H. Pitchersky, died at the age of 57 in 2004.

In 2005, he married Diane Orentlicher, a professor of international law at the American University Washington College of Law. Orentlicher formerly served as a deputy in the Office of War Crimes in the U.S. Department of State.

Halperin began his career in academia as a research associate at the Harvard Center for International Affairs (1960–66). He was an instructor in government at Harvard (1961–1963) and an assistant professor of government (1964–1966).

== Johnson and Nixon administrations ==
From 1966 to 1967, Halperin served as a special assistant to the Assistant Secretary of Defense for International Security Affairs.

At 29-years-old, from 1967 to 1969, he became the youngest ever Deputy Assistant Secretary of Defense for International Security Affairs (Policy, Planning, and Arms Control).

He joined the National Security Council in 1969 as the director of policy planning. Halperin and Henry Kissinger, Nixon's new National Security Advisor, had been colleagues at Harvard.

Halperin's appointment was immediately criticized by General Earle G. Wheeler, chairman of the Joint Chiefs of Staff; FBI director J. Edgar Hoover; and Senator Barry Goldwater.

=== Wire tapping and Nixon's enemies list ===
On May 9, 1969, The New York Times reported that the United States had been bombing Cambodia. Kissinger called Hoover to find out who might have leaked this information to the press. Hoover suggested Halperin, and Kissinger agreed that was likely. That day, the FBI began tapping Halperin's phones at Kissinger's direction. The Nixon administration bugged Halperin's home phone, without a warrant, for 21 months starting in 1969.

Halperin also ended up on Nixon's Enemies List of 20 people with whom the White House was unhappy because they disagreed in some way with the administration. Halperin was number 8 on the list. Nixon aide Charles Colson, who compiled the list, wrote next to Halperin's name, "a scandal would be helpful here."

Defense Secretary Robert McNamara asked Halperin to oversee the production of the Pentagon Papers. Les Gelb, a member of Halperin's staff, oversaw the staff that actually wrote the study. Halperin was a friend of Daniel Ellsberg. When Ellsberg was investigated in connection with the Pentagon Papers, suspicion fell on Halperin, who some Nixon aides believed had kept classified documents when he left government service. The tapping of Halperin's phone without a warrant was discovered when it came out in Ellsberg's trial.

Despite the continued use of the wiretap well after Halperin left government, Kissinger told reporters on May 13, 1973, that, "I never received any information that cast any doubt on [Halperin's] loyalty and discretion."

Halperin sued in federal court. Halperin won a symbolic $1 judgment in 1977 for the offense, but the judgment was overturned by an appeals court. In 1991, Kissinger apologized to Halperin in a letter and the suit was dropped at Halperin's request in 1992.

== Positions between government service ==
After leaving the Nixon administration, Halperin joined the Brookings Institution as a senior fellow from 1969 to 1973 and then became the research director for the Project on Information, National Security and Constitutional Procedures at the Twentieth Century Fund from 1974 to 1975. He was the director for the Project on National Security and Civil Liberties from 1975 to 1977.

From 1977 to 1992, he served as the director of the Center for National Security Studies (jointly sponsored by the Fund for Peace and the American Civil Liberties Union Foundation. And from 1992 to 1994, he was a senior associate at the Carnegie Endowment for International Peace.

== American Civil Liberties Union (ACLU) ==
From 1984 to 1992, Halperin served as director of the American Civil Liberties Union (ACLU) office in Washington.

While at the ACLU, Halperin, along with Jerry Berman, also at the ACLU, worked with President Reagan's CIA Director William Casey to agree on language in the Intelligence Identities Protection Act of 1982, which has successfully protected journalists publishing the names of covert agents. He also worked on a number of civil rights bills, including an immigration reform bill in 1986, the Civil Rights Restoration Act of 1987, and the American Disabilities Act of 1990. He defended the right of The Progressive magazine to publish a description of the design principle of a thermonuclear weapon (H-Bomb).

== Clinton administration ==
At the start of the Clinton administration, Halperin was appointed as a consultant to the Secretary of Defense and the Under Secretary of Defense for Policy (1993).

In 1994 President Clinton nominated Halperin for the position of assistant secretary of defense for democracy and peacekeeping, and was opposed by the Senate Armed Services Committee which supplied a detailed list of Halperin's activities and stated views which it regarded as incompatible with his appointment. Clinton then named him to be a Special Assistant to the President and Senior Director for Democracy at the National Security Council (1994–1996).

Secretary of State Madeleine Albright appointed him to the position of Director of Policy Planning at the State Department (1998–2001) in Clinton's second term. Halperin focused on several issues of interest to Secretary Albright, including democracy promotion (the Community of Democracies and inauguration of the four priority democracies); nuclear issues; a review of the way that the United States responds to humanitarian disasters overseas; and northeast Asian security. He also was integrally involved in managing the crises in Kosovo and East Timor.

== Post-Clinton administration ==
Following his service in the Clinton Administration, Halperin joined the Council on Foreign Relations (2001-2002) as senior fellow and director, Center for Democracy and Free Markets.

Halperin created the Open Society Foundations' office in Washington, D.C., and oversaw all policy advocacy on U.S. and international issues, including promotion of human rights and support for open societies abroad. He was the director of the Washington office for the Open Society Institute (now the Open Society Foundations) from 2002 to 2005 and the director of U.S. advocacy from 2005 to 2008. He was the executive director of the Open Society Policy Center from 2002 to 2008.

He also was a senior vice president at the Center for American Progress from 2003 to 2005 and a senior fellow at CAP from 2003 to 2009.

== Obama administration ==
President Obama nominated Halperin to serve on the board of the Millennium Challenge Corporation in 2012 and again in 2015, and he was twice confirmed by the U.S. Senate. He served as director until March 9, 2018.

== Publications ==
Halperin is the author and co-author of 25 books, including Bureaucratic Politics and Foreign Policy. The first edition of Bureaucratic Politics and Foreign Policy. He also wrote Strategy and Arms Control (with Thomas C. Schelling); Limited War in the Nuclear Age; and Contemporary Military Strategy.

=== Selected articles ===
- Review of SPOOKS: The Haunting of America—The Private Use of Secret Agents, by Jim Hougan. The New York Times (November 26, 1978), p. SM 212.
- "Guaranteeing Democracy". Foreign Policy, no. 91 (Summer 1993), pp. 105–122. doi:10.2307/1149062. JSTOR 1149062.

== Awards ==
Halperin has won numerous awards, including:

- Meritorious Civilian Service Award, Department of Defense, January 1969
- Hugh M. Hefner First Amendment Award, Playboy Foundation, July 1981
- Wilbur Lucius Cross Medal, Yale Graduate School Alumni Association, June 1983
- Fellow, John D. and Catherine T. MacArthur Foundation, June 1985, June 1990
- John Jay Award, Columbia College, 1986
- Public Service Award, Federation of American Scientists, December 1998
- National Freedom of Information Act Hall of Fame, March 2006

In 1985 he won a MacArthur Foundation fellowship.

He was a partial writer of The Lawless State, which documents the surveillance techniques and crimes of the U.S. government during the Cold War.

== Boards ==
Halperin is the chairman of the Community of Democracies, Civil Society Pillar International Steering Committee and he is chairman of the advisory council of the board of directors of J Street. He also serves on the boards of ONE and ONE Action.
