= Rick Klein =

American journalist

- Born: November 21, 1976 (age 48); Islip, NY
- Education: Princeton University, Bachelor of Arts, 1998
- Occupation: Journalist
- Spouse: Laine Kaplowitz
- Children: 2
- Website: ABCNews.com/politics

Rick Klein (born 1976) is an American journalist who serves as Vice President and Washington Bureau Chief for ABC News.

== Biography ==
Klein is the son of Esther (née Canetti) and Stuart Klein. His mother and father were both schoolteachers. He was raised in Babylon, New York on Long Island. Klein is of Jewish descent. He graduated with a B.A. in politics from Princeton University where he also served as the editor-in-chief of The Daily Princetonian. He started his career as a metro reporter for The Dallas Morning News and then The Boston Globe where he covered Congress and national politics. In 2007, he joined ABC News where he wrote The Note and later served as Senior Washington editor for World News with Diane Sawyer, co-anchor for the network's digital coverage with Sam Donaldson and as an on-air political analyst. He was promoted to Political Director for ABC News, where he is tasked with overseeing and directing all of the network's political coverage. He held that role until 2024, when ABC News appointed him as Vice President and Washington Bureau Chief.

== Personal life ==
In 2005, he married Laine Kaplowitz in Cleveland, Ohio; they have 2 children and live in Washington D.C.
