= Alex Wagner Tonight =

US daily news and opinion television program

- Genre: Political news/opinion program
- Directed by: Rob Katko
- Presented by: Alex Wagner
- Country of origin: United States
- Original language: English

Production
- Executive producer: Matthew Alexander
- Production location: New York City
- Camera setup: Multi-camera
- Running time: 60 minutes

Original release
- Network: MSNBC
- Release: August 16, 2022 – January 17, 2025

Related
- The Rachel Maddow Show

Alex Wagner Tonight is an American liberal news and opinion television program that was televised by MSNBC. Hosted by Alex Wagner, it premiered on August 16, 2022, and aired on Tuesdays through Fridays as a substitute for The Rachel Maddow Show (which, since May 2022, has only aired on Monday nights).

In February 2025, after having been placed on a hiatus since January 17, 2025, in favor of Maddow to cover the first hundred days of the second Trump administration, Alex Wagner Tonight was cancelled by MSNBC and replaced by The Briefing with Jen Psaki.

== History ==
From February to April 2022, as part of her new contract with NBCUniversal, Rachel Maddow took an extended hiatus from her MSNBC program The Rachel Maddow Show in order to focus on other film and podcast projects, with rotating guest hosts filling in for her. Upon Maddow's return, she announced that she would only host the show on Monday nights beginning in May, and continue to feature guest hosts throughout the rest of the week.

At this point, The Rachel Maddow Show was retitled MSNBC Prime on Tuesday through Friday nights, but retained the same staff and overall format, and with the guest hosts usually being MSNBC personalities with a similar style to Maddow. Average viewership of the hour as MSNBC Prime was lower than that of The Rachel Maddow Show, but still ahead of timeslot competitor CNN Tonight (a replacement of Cuomo Prime Time with rotating hosts after Chris Cuomo was fired from the network) and behind Fox News Channel's Hannity.

In June 2022, MSNBC announced that MSNBC Prime would be replaced by a new show hosted by Alex Wagner beginning on August 16. On August 3, MSNBC announced that the program would be titled Alex Wagner Tonight.

Wagner stated that the show would aim to combine Maddow's "intellectual rigor and informative analysis" with aspects that are representative of her own personal experiences, including more segments in the field and segments on climate change, immigration, and race. The program shared most of its staff with The Rachel Maddow Show. The series premiere of Alex Wagner Tonight—which featured guests Mark Leibovich, Adam Kinzinger, and Joyce Vance, as well as coverage of Wyoming's Republican primary—was seen by around 2 million viewers.

On January 13, 2025, it was announced that Alex Wagner Tonight would go on hiatus from January 20 to April 30, 2025, with The Rachel Maddow Show temporarily returning to a weeknight schedule to cover the first hundred days of the second presidency of Donald Trump. During this hiatus, Wagner would be placed on special assignment to report on the repercussions of Trump's policy decisions across the country and internationally.

In February 2025, new MSNBC president Rebecca Kutler announced a revamp of the network's schedule and the cancellation of Alex Wagner Tonight. She will remain with the network as a contributor, while her show was replaced by The Briefing with Jen Psaki.

Preceded by All In with Chris Hayes	MSNBC Weekday Lineup (Tuesdays-Fridays): 9:00–10:00 p.m. (ET); midnight – 1:00 a.m. (ET) (replay); 4:00–5:00 a.m. (ET) (replay)	Succeeded by: The Last Word with Lawrence O'Donnell; Way Too Early with Ali Vitali
