= The Note (ABC News) =

The Note is a summary and analysis of political news stories and trends published every weekday morning by ABCNews.com.

Begun as an internal staff e-mail by then Political Director Mark Halperin, it was first published on January 14, 2002. The Note was edited by Senior Political Reporter Rick Klein from 2007 through 2010, by Michael Falcone from 2010 through 2016, and is now written again by Klein and deputy political director MaryAlice Parks.

In 2006 The Note's online podcast counterpart, AfterNote was frequently hosted by ABC News field producer Teddy Davis.

In April 2007, Halperin left his post as editor of The Note. He was replaced by Rick Klein, who began writing The Note on May 2, 2007.

== Criticisms ==
The Note has been criticized for alleged pro-Republican bias. Left-wing journalist Eric Boehlert writes that "it never crosses over into actually being edgy. In fact, The Note doesn't mock conventional wisdom so much as idolize it" and says it "is enamored of Republican Party talking points".

The Note has also been criticized for alleged anti-Republican bias. In a memo dated October 8, 2004, Mark Halperin instructed ABC employees that while both the Kerry campaign and the Bush campaign were guilty of distorting facts, they should be willing to say that distortions coming from the Bush campaign were worse when, in Halperin's estimation, they were.

Another frequent criticism is that despite its blog-like style and the increasing popularity of feed readers (especially in the political world), The Note does not publish its content via RSS (except for its podcast). ABCNews.com offers a single RSS feed for all of its political content, of which The Note is only one part. This feed does not contain the full text of The Note, but instead only a headline and link.

== Jargon ==
The Note often employs jargon that may be incomprehensible to outsiders. Examples of this jargon include:

- The Gang of 500 refers to political insiders and journalists who influence the daily media narrative in U.S. politics. About ten percent of the Gang of 500 is made up of political journalists. The term was coined by Mark Halperin as "campaign consultants, strategists, pollsters, pundits, and journalists who make up the modern-day political establishment". They are "the 500 people whose decisions matter to the political news and campaign narrative we get from the major media".
  In November 2017, journalist Eve Fairbanks penned an essay in BuzzFeed claiming that the Gang of 500 was a made up term designed to make Halperin seem like a bigger expert than he truly was.
- googling monkeys
- chattering classes
- "Big Casino" refers to the federal budget and uncertainty around revenue and spending caused by changes in the economy, war, and other unpredictable circumstances that will affect the ability of politicians to change taxes or spending.
