= The Lawless State =

1976 book

The Lawless State: The Crimes of the U.S. Intelligence Agencies
- First paperback edition
- Author: Morton H. Halperin, Jerry J. Berman, Robert L. Borosage, and Christine M. Marwick
- Language: English
- Genre: Non-fiction
- Publisher: Penguin Books
- Publication date: 1976

The Lawless State: The Crimes of the U.S. Intelligence Agencies was written in 1976 jointly by Morton H. Halperin, Jerry J. Berman, Robert L. Borosage, and Christine M. Marwick. It recounts abuses of power by the U.S. Government throughout the Cold War, and is concerned mostly with surveillance methods and overstepped boundaries.

Topics mentioned include:

- The CIA and FBI using illegal intelligence and intimidation methods through wiretaps and COINTELPRO.
- The use of dissent-limiting programs such as Operation Chaos to link dissenting anti-war organizations to the USSR, and extensive FBI investigation and sabotage of Martin Luther King Jr.
- U.S. Government activity in South America, and its part in the Chilean coup that put dictator Augusto Pinochet in power.
