= With All Due Respect (TV program) =

Television series

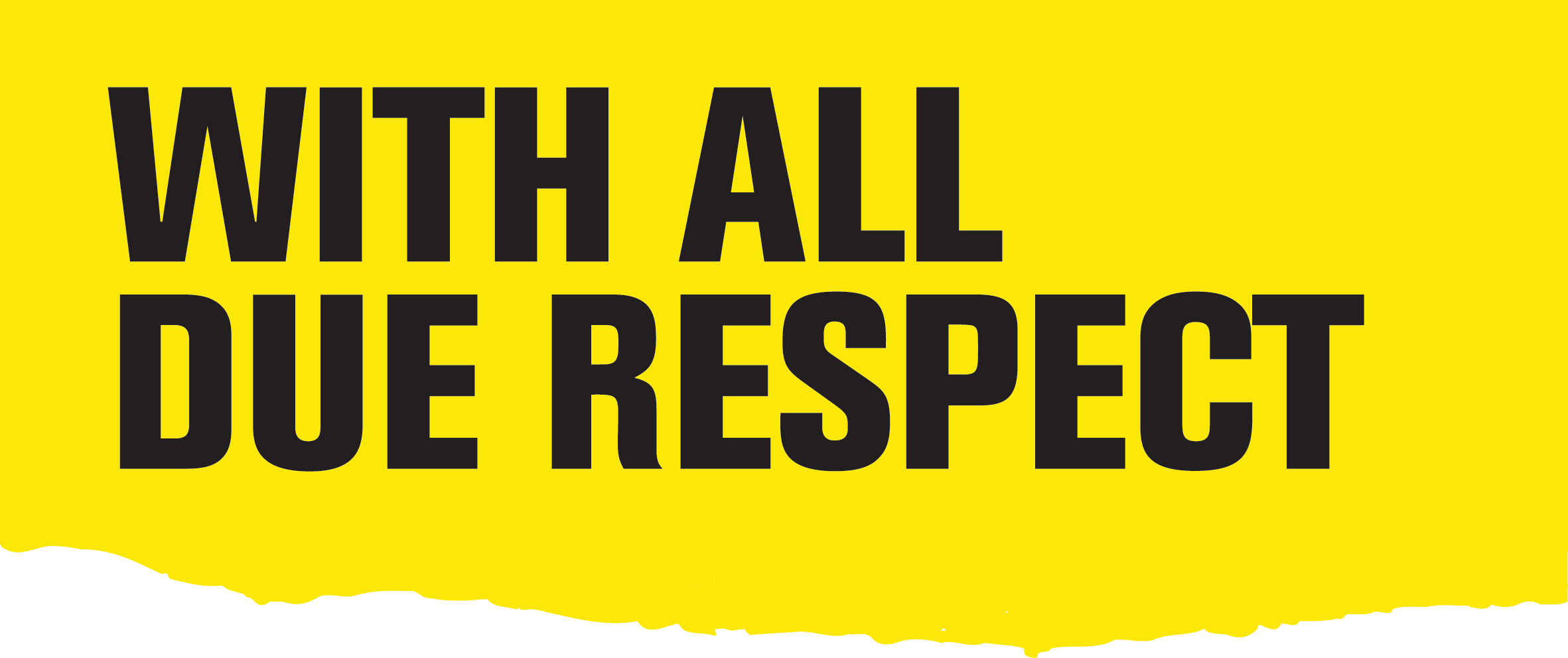
- Genre: Talk show
- Presented by: Mark Halperin; John Heilemann
- Country of origin: United States
- Original language: English

Production
- Production location: New York City

Original release
- Network: Bloomberg
- Release: October 6, 2014 – January 20, 2017

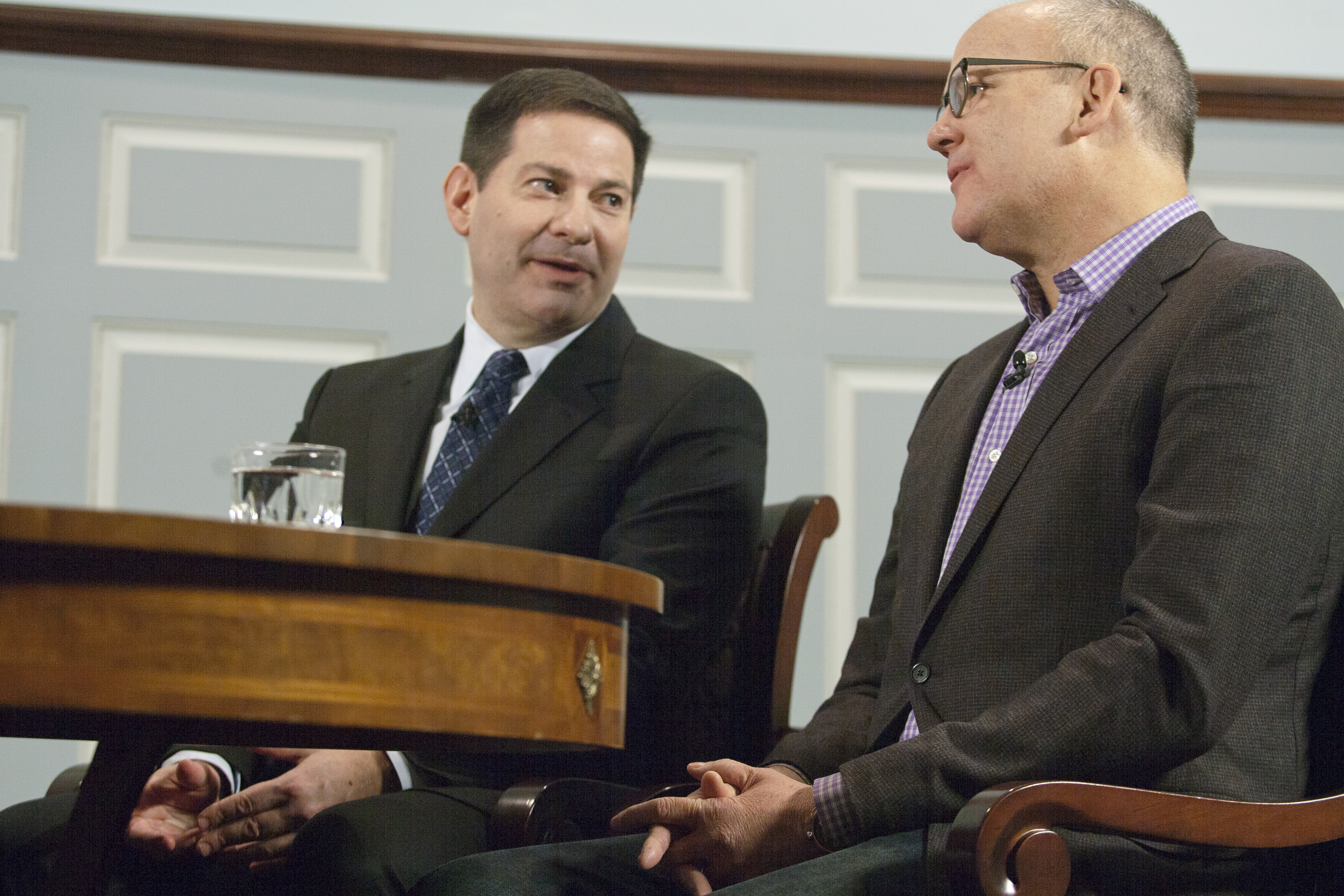
Hosts Mark Halperin and John Heilemann in 2012

With All Due Respect is an American television series broadcast by Bloomberg Television, featuring Mark Halperin and John Heilemann. On October 6, 2014, the series began airing weekdays at 5 pm ET on Bloomberg Television, with repeats at 8 pm ET. The show re-aired weekdays at 6 pm ET on MSNBC. Each weekday, Halperin and Heilemann took an irreverent look at the presidential race, including their own observations and those of guest reporters and political figures.

On November 17, 2016, with the presidential election season over, the series was cancelled. The last regular show aired on December 2, 2016. Five final special episodes aired on the week of the inauguration of Donald Trump.

In 2016, Donny Deutsch co-hosted several episodes with Halperin and Heilemann.
