= Download – The True Story of the Internet =

Television series

- Genre: Documentary television series
- Starring: John Heilemann
- Country of origin: United States
- Original language: English
- No. of seasons: 1
- No. of episodes: 4

Production
- Production company: Oxford Scientific Films

Original release
- Network: Science Channel (U.S.); Discovery Channel (other countries)
- Release: March 3 – March 4, 2008

Download: The True Story of the Internet is a documentary television series about Internet history. It is aired on Science Channel in the US and Discovery Channel for other countries. It originally aired on March 3, 2008. The show was hosted by John Heilemann.

== Parts ==
There are four parts to the documentary:

- Part 1: Browser Wars – The rise and fall of Netscape and its battle against Microsoft
- Part 2: Search – The rise of Google and Yahoo
- Part 3: Bubble – The dot.com crash of 2000 and the mainstays of the Internet: Amazon.com and eBay
- Part 4: People Power – Peer to peer technology, web 2.0, and social networking

== Interviews ==
The documentary features interviews with:

- Marc Andreessen
- James H. Clark
- Shawn Fanning
- Justin Frankel
- Chad Hurley
- Rob McCool
- Lou Montulli
- Thomas Reardon
- Gary Reback
- Hillary Rosen
- Aleks Totic
- Kevin Rose
