= Mark Halperin =

American journalist (born 1965)

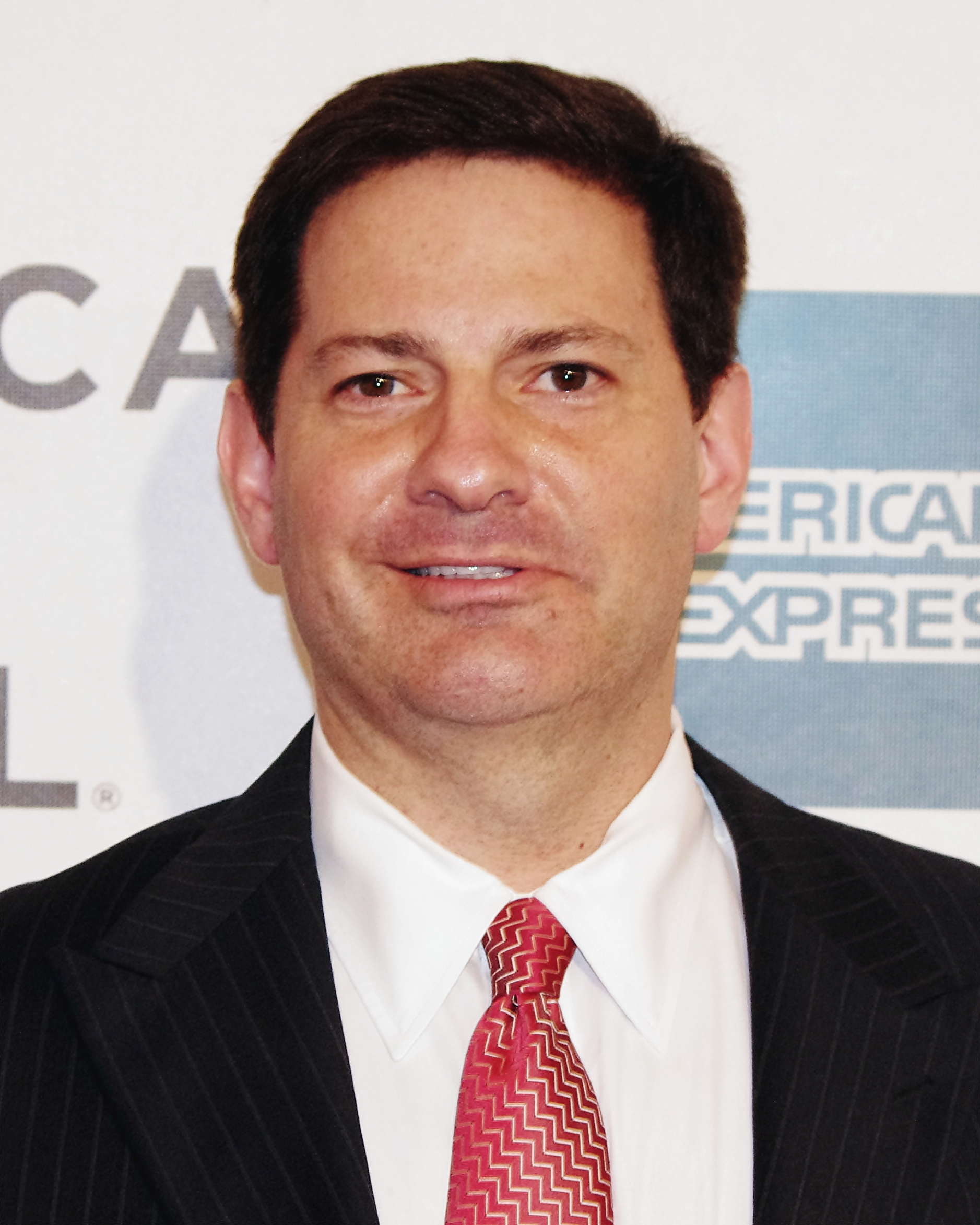
- Halperin at the 2012 Tribeca Film Festival premiere of Knife Fight
- Born: Mark Evan Halperin; January 11, 1965 (age 61); New York City, U.S.
- Education: Harvard University (BA)
- Occupations: Anchor; Author; Columnist
- Years active: 1988–present
- Notable work: Game Change (2010); Double Down: Game Change 2012 (2013)
- Spouse: Karen Avrich
- Parent: Morton Halperin (father)

Mark Evan Halperin (born January 11, 1965) is an American journalist, political commentator, author, and founder of the interactive media platform 2WAY. He previously was political director for ABC News, where he also edited the Washington, D.C., newsletter The Note. In 2010, Halperin joined MSNBC as a senior political analyst and contributor. Alongside John Heilemann, he co-managed Bloomberg Politics, co-hosted With All Due Respect, and co-authored the bestselling books Game Change and Double Down: Game Change 2012. Halperin also co-produced and appeared with Heilemann and Mark McKinnon in Showtime's The Circus: Inside the Greatest Political Show on Earth, covering the 2016 United States presidential election.

In 2017, Halperin was accused by multiple women of sexual harassment and workplace misconduct during his time at ABC News, leading to his dismissal from NBC News, Showtime, and other media partnerships. He later returned to broadcasting through independent platforms, launching the digital news network 2WAY, and in 2025 began hosting a program on Megyn Kelly’s MK Media network.

== Early life and education ==
Halperin was born to a Jewish family, the son of Morton Halperin, a foreign policy expert and staff member of the National Security Council during the presidential administration of Richard Nixon where he worked for Henry Kissinger; and Ina Weinstein Halperin Young. He was born in New York City and raised in Bethesda, Maryland.

In 1982, before he began his senior year at Walt Whitman High School, he lived with a family in Japan as part of the Youth for Understanding program. He received his B.A. from Harvard University in 1987.

== Career ==
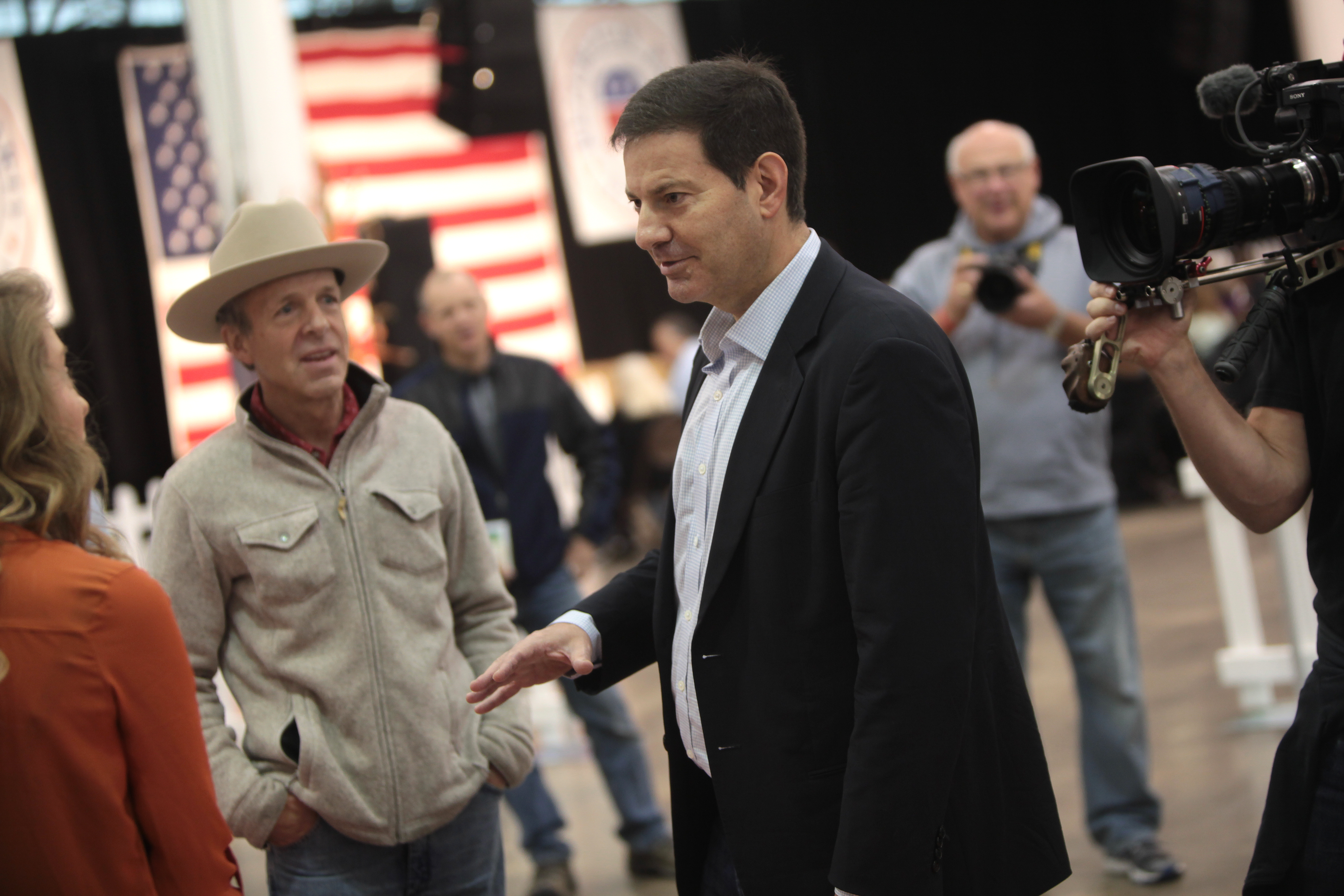
Halperin with co-host Mark McKinnon at the 2015 Iowa Growth & Opportunity Party, Varied Industries Building, Iowa State Fairgrounds, Des Moines, Iowa, during shooting of The Circus

=== ABC News and MSNBC ===
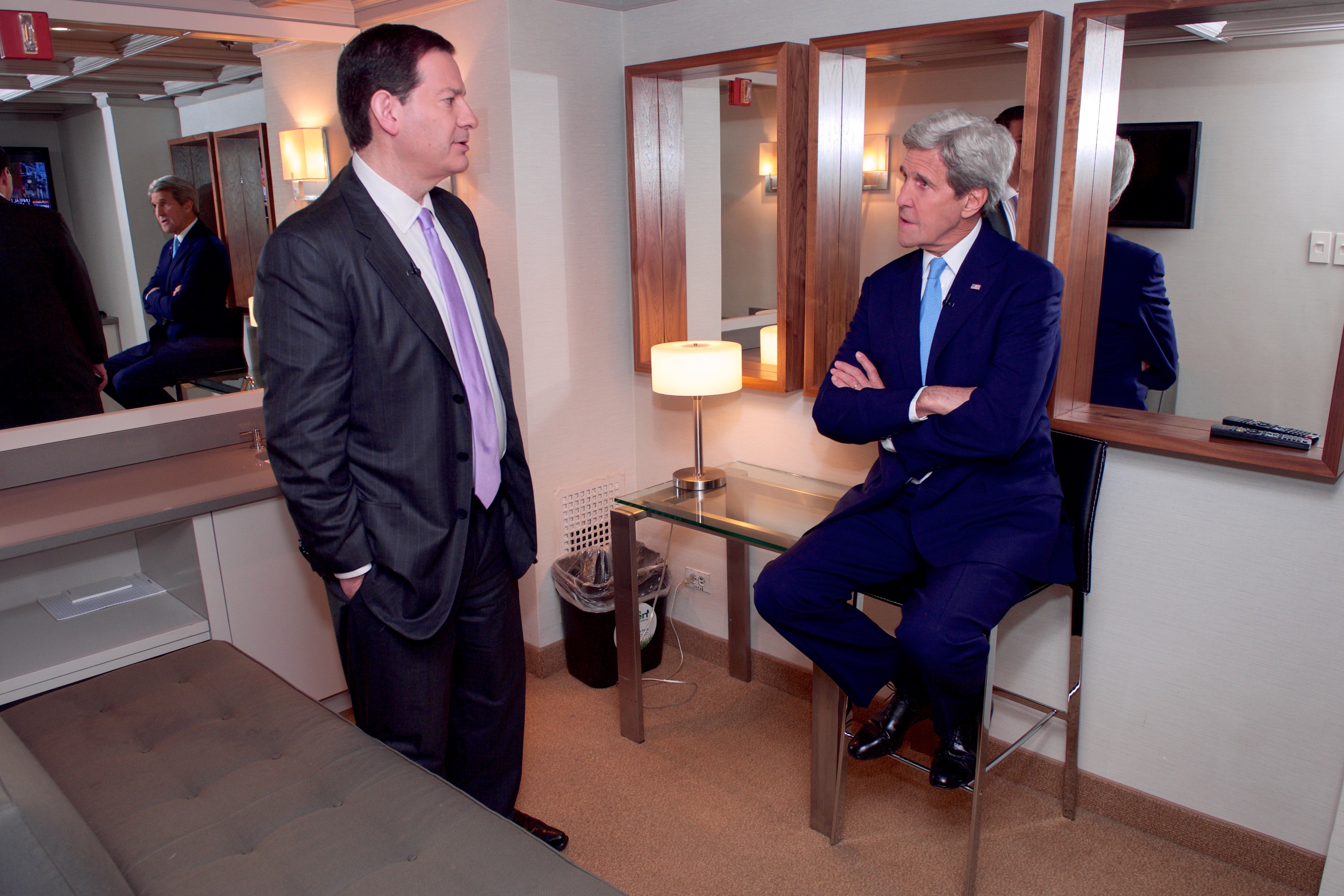
Secretary of State John Kerry chats with MSNBC analyst Halperin before appearing on Morning Joe in New York.

Halperin joined ABC News in 1988.

In 1997, he was named the political director for ABC News. In that capacity, Halperin appeared frequently as a correspondent and political analyst for ABC News television and radio programs. He founded and edited The Note, which appeared daily on ABCNews.com.

In October 2006, Halperin and John F. Harris, published a book together, The Way to Win: Clinton, Bush, Rove, and How to Take the White House in 2008.

Since 2006, Halperin has been a board member of the New Hampshire Institute of Politics at Saint Anselm College in Goffstown, New Hampshire. He has been on their public advisory board since it was created in 2008.

In March 2007, Halperin became a political analyst for ABC News and was replaced as political director by David Chalian. In May 2007, he was hired as a political analyst and editor at large for Time magazine. In June 2010, he was hired as a senior political analyst at MSNBC. In 2011, Time released an iPad app called "Mark Halperin 2012" that contains material from Halperin's "The Page" as well as video, photos, breaking news, and Halperin's take on the news.

==== Criticism ====
On June 30, 2011, Halperin was suspended from his duties at MSNBC for "slurring" President Barack Obama on the program Morning Joe, after he said of Obama "I thought he was kind of a dick" for his performance at the previous day's press conference. His suspension was lifted a month later.

In December 2011, Halperin was listed as number 1 in Salon's 2011 Hack List, his reporting described as "shallow and predictable" as well as "both fixated solely on the horse race and also uniquely bad at analyzing the horse race".

Benjamin Wallace-Wells of The New Yorker wrote that Halperin's The Circus is "both an argument for horse-race journalism and a way to see its inner workings, and so to track Heilemann and Halperin in their long traipse across the American interior is to see the media discovering its own vulnerabilities, just as Trump was exploiting them".

=== Subsequent career ===
According to a May 3, 2019 report in The Daily Beast, Halperin worked on repairing his reputation during the first quarter of 2019 with a goal of returning as a pundit on television and radio. According to the article, Halperin enlisted the help of Michael Smerconish, Mika Brzezinski, and Joe Scarborough on an under-the-radar yet calculated professional rehabilitation campaign. Since the beginning of 2019, Halperin resumed posting on Twitter. Around the same time, Halperin appeared on SiriusXM with Smerconish, where he said he has been working with the Fortune Society, a New York City-based nonprofit organization that provides essential support to the formerly incarcerated.

On August 18, 2019, publisher Regan Arts announced that Halperin had signed a new book deal. The book, entitled How to Beat Trump: America's Top Political Strategists on What It Will Take, was published in early-November 2019. Contributors to the book included David Axelrod, Donna Brazile, and James Carville. Both CNN and NBC declined to promote the book.

After news broke about his upcoming book, Halperin faced widespread criticism and outrage, with Gretchen Carlson calling the deal "a slap in the face to all women". Rebecca Katz, a political strategist said on Twitter, "you can beat Trump without supporting the career rehabilitation of Mark Halperin." CNN political commentator Karen Finney called Halperin "a predator" and denounced publisher Regan Arts. Eleanor McManus, who had written of being sexually harassed by Halperin as a 21-year-old, commented: "He leveraged his position as a prominent journalist to prey on women... Giving him a book once again puts him in a position of authority and that is a slap in the face to all the women that he has victimized."

According to a September 9, 2019 report in The Daily Beast, Halperin allegedly made vague threats toward MSNBC president Phil Griffin during a phone call after Griffin refused to approve a possible collaboration with the Morning Joe team earlier in 2019.

In 2019, Halperin launched a daily political blog called "Wide World of News". In 2023, Wide World of News became a paid subscription described as "the inside track on what will happen next and why" in the political arena.

In 2020, Halperin began appearing on Newsmax TV, both as a contributor and as the host of its weekly Sunday show, Mark Halperin's Focus Group. The series ended after three seasons.

=== 2WAY ===
In 2024, Halperin founded and launched a startup interactive video platform called "2WAY", where he currently facilitates daily live video conference calls that attract tens of thousands of viewers. The program is described as a virtual town hall, where a bipartisan panel (usually consisting of Sean Spicer and Dan Turrentine) reacts to the real-time opinions of ordinary people speaking on the topics of the day in what is essentially a large zoom call. Halperin moderates. Since May 2026, the permanent co-hosts of the show are Republican Larry O'Connor and Democrat Kevin Walling.

Halperin begins most segments by saying the platform seeks to promote "peace, love and understanding", an ethos of listening and learning, and to not "put smack in the chat" despite partisan disagreements. Segments are viewable and archived on 2way.tv, YouTube and X.

Halperin was among the first political journalists to predict that President Biden would drop out of the 2024 race.

=== MK Media ===
In March 2025, Halperin joined MK Media, a new podcast and video network founded by former Fox News anchor Megyn Kelly. The network, launched in April 2025, aimed to offer an alternative to traditional media with a focus on live discussion and unfiltered commentary. Halperin began hosting a program titled Next Up with Mark Halperin, featuring interviews with political figures, cultural commentators, and audience interaction.

Halperin’s show was featured prominently in the network’s launch materials, alongside other new programs hosted by journalist Maureen Callahan and social media personality Link Lauren.

== Controversies ==
=== Coverage of Donald Trump ===
During the 2016 United States presidential election, Halperin was repeatedly criticized for his coverage of Donald Trump 2016 presidential campaign.

The Washington Post's Dana Milbank noted that in June 2016, on his Bloomberg TV show, With All Due Respect, Halperin asserted that "it's not racial" for Trump to attempt to disqualify an Indiana-born federal judge as a "Mexican" because of his ancestry. His reason: "Mexico isn't a race." Halperin went on to acknowledge however, "It's certainly racially tinged." Alex Shephard, writing in The New Republic, criticized his coverage for being "totally fixated" on the horse race and for shallow analysis, and "that he’s wanted to carry Donald Trump's bags for years." On November 3, 2016, NBC's Brian Williams said Halperin had "gone out of his way" to give Trump favorable coverage. "When Donald Trump complains he is not getting favorable coverage in the MSM"—making reference to the mainstream media—"he has not been listening to you this cycle", Williams said to Halperin on Williams' show. "It's a question of looking at the data," said Halperin. "If there's a bit more of a national surge, and if it turns out that his ceiling is higher than the Clinton folks think...I think it's possible he (Trump) could find his way to 270" electoral votes. Less than a week later Trump surprised many people by winning over 300 electoral votes.

=== Sexual harassment allegations ===
On October 26, 2017, CNN disclosed that five women had, on condition of anonymity, accused Halperin of sexual harassment or sexual assault. One woman told the network she was assaulted after visiting Halperin in the early 2000s. "I went up to have a soda and talk and—he just kissed me and grabbed my boobs", the woman said. "I just froze. I didn't know what to do."

Yet another woman told CNN that Halperin once pressed his penis to her shoulder during the 2004 campaign cycle. "I was obviously completely shocked", she said. "Given I was so young and new, I wasn't sure if that was the sort of thing that was expected of you if you wanted something from a male figure in news."

Another former ABC News woman employee told CNN that she had been on the road with Halperin when he propositioned her. "I excused myself to go to the bathroom and he was standing there when I opened the door, propositioning [me] to go into the other bathroom to do something", she said. "It freaked me out. I came out of the ladies' room and he was just standing there. Like almost blocking the door."

CNN also reported that three other women described Halperin, "without consent, pressing an erection against their bodies while he was clothed". One of the women alleged an incident during which "Halperin had pressed his genitals against her while she was seated in his office".

Halperin subsequently apologized for pursuing "relationships with women that I worked with, including some junior to me", but he also denied allegations that he had ever pressed his genitals against one woman and grabbed another woman's breast. He further announced that he would temporarily leave his daily work to "properly deal with this situation".

Later that day, NBC News released a statement saying that in light of the allegations, Halperin would not return as a senior political analyst "until the questions around his past conduct are fully understood". HBO announced it would no longer go forward with a planned miniseries about the presidential election that was based in part on Halperin's then-upcoming book on the 2016 election. The cable channel said in a statement, "HBO has no tolerance for sexual harassment within the company or its productions." Penguin Press also canceled the latest installment of the Game Change series Halperin was co-authoring with John Heilemann, which HBO had already canceled plans to adapt.

A day after their first story, CNN ran a second story revealing that the number of women accusing Halperin of misconduct had grown to "at least a dozen". In a lengthy statement published in response to the CNN report, Halperin denied several of the new allegations, including ones that he masturbated in front of anyone or physically assaulted anyone. He apologized to the women he "mistreated" while acknowledging that he recognized he had a problem near the end of his tenure at ABC, received weekly counseling sessions, and ended the behavior; however, a later report from The Daily Beast included an allegation of harassment from 2011.

On October 30, 2017, both NBC and MSNBC terminated Halperin's contract with the networks. On January 3, 2018, Showtime replaced Halperin on The Circus with then-CBS News anchor Alex Wagner.

== Personal life ==
Halperin resides in New York City with his wife, Karen Avrich, co-author of Sasha and Emma.

== Bibliography ==
- Mark Halperin and John F. Harris, The Way to Win: Taking the White House in 2008, Random House, October 2006, ISBN 1-4000-6447-3
- Mark Halperin and John Heilemann, Game Change: Obama and the Clintons, McCain and Palin, and the Race of a Lifetime, Harper, January 2010, ISBN 0-06-173363-6
- Mark Halperin and John Heilemann, Double Down: Game Change 2012, Penguin Press, November 2013 ISBN 1594204403
- Mark Halperin, How to Beat Trump: America's Top Political Strategists on What It Will Take, Regan Arts, November 2019
