= John Heilemann =

American journalist (born 1966)

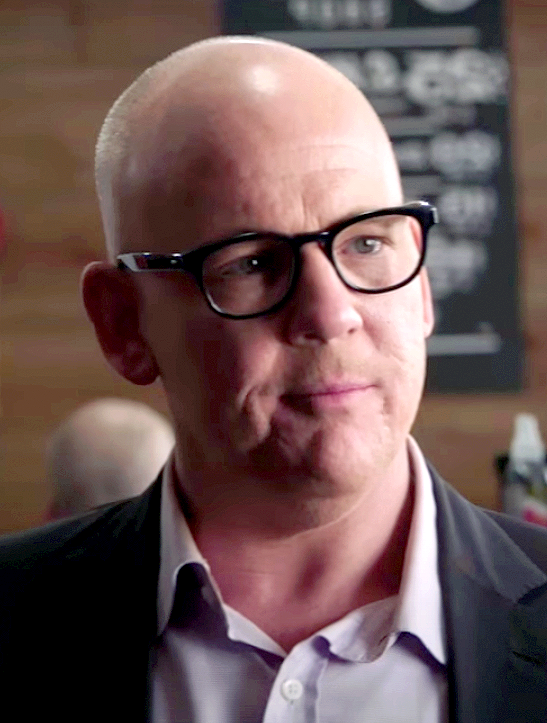
- Heilemann in 2017
- Born: John Arthur Heilemann; January 23, 1966 (age 60); Los Angeles, California, U.S.
- Education: Northwestern University (BA); Harvard University (MPP)
- Occupations: Journalist; Anchor
- Notable work: Game Change: Obama and the Clintons, McCain and Palin, and the Race of a Lifetime co-author Double Down: Game Change 2012 co-author
- Television: With All Due Respect, The Circus: Inside the Greatest Political Show on Earth
- Spouse: Diana Rhoten

John Arthur Heilemann (born January 23, 1966) is an American journalist and national affairs analyst for NBC News and MSNBC. With Mark Halperin, he co-authored Game Change (2010) and Double Down (2013), books about presidential campaigning. Heilemann has formerly been a staff writer for New York, Wired, and The Economist.

== Early life and education ==
Heilemann was born in Los Angeles in 1966 and grew up in Canoga Park. His family was originally from Wisconsin. Heilemann earned a Bachelor of Arts degree in journalism and political science from Northwestern University and a Master of Public Policy degree from the Harvard Kennedy School.

== Career ==
He is the author of Pride Before the Fall (2001), a book about the Microsoft antitrust case. He has been a staff writer for New York, Wired, and The Economist. He was the host of a four-part documentary series for Discovery called Download: the True Story of the Internet, about the rise of the World Wide Web, which first aired in 2008.

He is the co-author (with Mark Halperin) of Game Change (2010) and Double Down (2013), books about Presidential campaigns. He and Halperin co-hosted With All Due Respect (2014–2017), a political analysis show on Bloomberg Television and MSNBC. Heilemann also produced and co-starred (with Halperin and Mark McKinnon) in Showtime's The Circus: Inside the Greatest Political Show on Earth, following the presidential candidates behind the scenes of their campaigns in the 2016 United States Presidential Election. Heilemann produces and co-stars in episodes of The Circus: Inside the Greatest Political Show on Earth, with Alex Wagner and Mark McKinnon, airing from 2016 to 2022. Heilemann is also an occasional guest on The Tony Kornheiser Show and MSNBC's Deadline: White House, Morning Joe, and Real Time With Bill Maher.

In 2019, Heilemann and John Battelle founded the Recount. The Recount has a website with video, podcasts, and a newsletter.

== Personal life ==
Heilemann was married to Diana Rhoten from 2006 until 2024. He currently lives in Manhattan.

== Bibliography ==
- Heilemann, John (January 9, 2001). Pride Before the Fall: The Trials of Bill Gates and the End of the Microsoft Era. Collins Business. ISBN 0-06-662117-8.
- Heilemann, John; Halperin, Mark (January 2010). Game Change: Obama and the Clintons, McCain and Palin, and the Race of a Lifetime. Harper. ISBN 978-0-06-173363-5.
- Heilemann, John; Halperin, Mark (October 2011). Race of a Lifetime: How Obama Won the White House (Kindle ed.). Penguin Books. ISBN 978-0141961347.
- Heilemann, John; Halperin, Mark (November 2013). Double Down: Game Change 2012. Penguin Press. ISBN 978-1594204401.

== See also ==
- Morning Joe
