= Alex Wagner =

American journalist (born 1977)

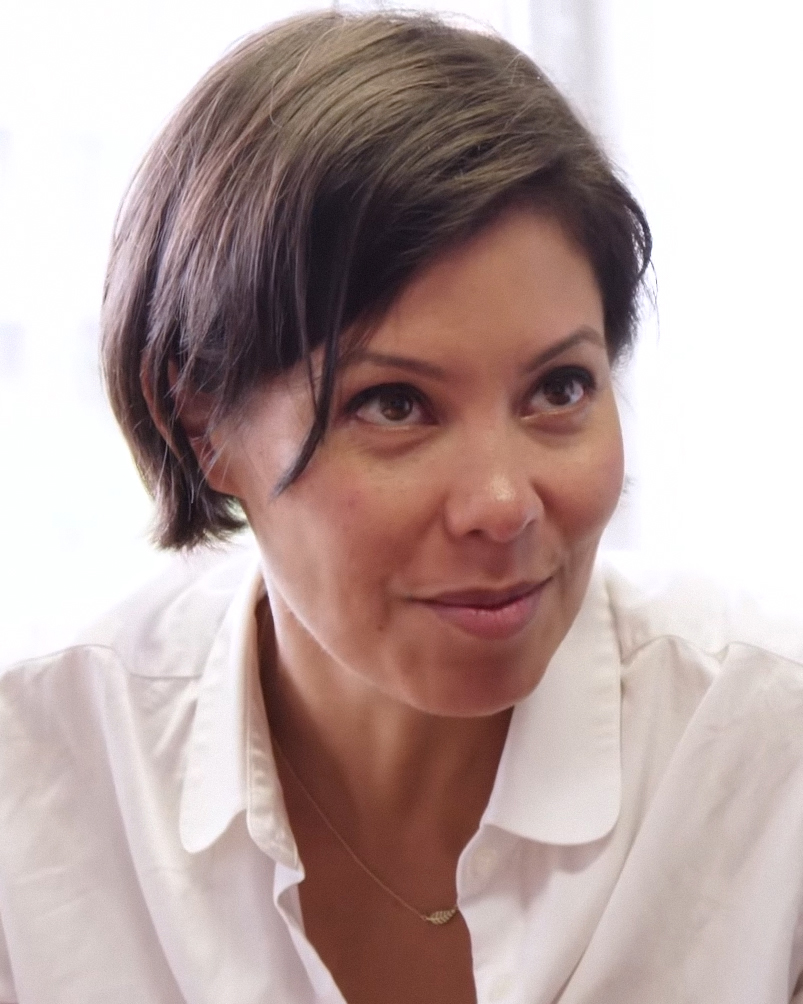
- Wagner in 2018
- Born: Alexandra Swe Wagner; November 27, 1977 (age 48); Washington, D.C., U.S.
- Education: Brown University (BA)
- Occupation: Television host
- Spouse: Sam Kass (m. 2014; div. 2025)
- Children: 2

Alexandra Swe Wagner (born November 27, 1977) is an American journalist and television host. She is a senior political analyst and was the host of Alex Wagner Tonight on MSNBC. She is the author of a 2018 memoir, FutureFace: A Family Mystery, an Epic Quest, and the Secret to Belonging. She was a contributor for CBS News, and is a contributing editor at The Atlantic. In 2022, she hosted the first season of Netflix's The Mole reboot. Previously, she was the anchor of the daytime program Now with Alex Wagner (2011–2015), the evening program Alex Wagner Tonight (2022-2025), on MSNBC, and the co-host of The Circus on Showtime. From November 2016 until March 2018, she was a TV co-anchor on CBS This Morning Saturday. She has also been a senior editor at The Atlantic magazine since April 2016.

After serving as a fill-in host for both The Rachel Maddow Show and All In with Chris Hayes on MSNBC, she began hosting Alex Wagner Tonight on August 16, 2022.

== Early life and education ==
Alex Wagner was born and raised in Washington, D.C. Her mother, Tin Swe Thant, is an immigrant from Yangon, Myanmar, who became a naturalized U.S. citizen before attending Swarthmore College. Her father, Carl Wagner, from Lansing, Iowa, was of Luxembourgish, German and Irish descent and was a graduate of Loras College in Dubuque, Iowa. He was a prominent Democratic Party political consultant who co-chaired Bill Clinton's 1992 presidential campaign. She attended Woodrow Wilson High School (renamed Jackson-Reed in 2022) and graduated from Brown University in 1999, having studied art history and literature. Wagner was raised Roman Catholic.

== Career ==
Wagner has worked as the cultural correspondent for the Center for American Progress. From 2003 to 2007, she was editor-in-chief of The Fader, a magazine covering music and cultural movements from around the world. She also served as executive director of Not on Our Watch Project, an advocacy organization focused on mass atrocities and human rights violations.

Wagner then became the White House correspondent for Politics Daily, a political news magazine under AOL News. She moved to The Huffington Post after it was acquired by AOL.

As an analyst on MSNBC, Wagner appeared on Countdown with Keith Olbermann, and The Last Word with Lawrence O'Donnell.

On November 14, 2011, Wagner began hosting Now with Alex Wagner weekdays (originally at noon ET, but later at 4 PM ET). On July 30, 2015, MSNBC President Phil Griffin announced that the series had been cancelled in an effort to transition the network's daytime programming to more breaking news reporting and less political commentary and opinion. The next day the program aired its final episode. MSNBC later announced that Wagner would host a weekend program, but those plans were later abandoned.

On April 26, 2016, The Atlantic announced that Wagner was leaving MSNBC to join the magazine as a senior editor. In addition to writing for The Atlantic, Wagner would moderate events with AtlanticLIVE and help with developing video and TV projects with The Atlantic Studios. In November 2016, Wagner replaced Vinita Nair on CBS This Morning Saturday. March 17, 2018, was her last appearance on CBS This Morning Saturday as she confirmed she would be leaving that show to co-host The Circus for Showtime, replacing Mark Halperin.

In 2020, Wagner launched a podcast with Crooked Media and Cadence13 called "Six Feet Apart" which addressed the COVID-19 pandemic. In August 2022, Wagner began presenting Alex Wagner Tonight, taking over Maddow's 9 PM slot on Tuesdays through Fridays as the latter scaled back to Mondays only. On February 23, 2025, MSNBC announced the cancellation of Alex Wagner Tonight, alongside Joy Reid's The ReidOut. She remains at MSNBC as a contributor.

On October 23, 2025, Wagner's podcast with Crooked Media, Runaway Country with Alex Wagner, premiered. Wagner is also a regular contributor on Crooked Media's flagship Pod Save America podcast.

== Political views ==
Wagner has described herself as progressive.

In a 2013 interview with Haaretz, which the newspaper described as "part of a PR effort by NBC news network in advance of President Obama’s upcoming visit to Israel", Wagner said that fear of being unfairly labeled as antisemitic "inhibits a robust discussion about Israel in the American media", and said "I think it’s incredibly tricky to talk about this unless you are incredibly fluent on the issue and you have a nuanced and comprehensive grasp of what’s going on."

== Personal life ==
On August 30, 2014, Wagner married former White House nutrition policy advisor and assistant chef Sam Kass in a ceremony held at Blue Hill at Stone Barns, a restaurant in Pocantico Hills, New York. The wedding was attended by then U.S. President Barack Obama and his family, as Kass had been the Obama family personal chef since they lived in Chicago. Wagner and Kass' first child was born in 2017. On April 16, 2019, she gave birth to their second son. In 2025, Wagner announced that she and Kass are now divorced.

== Books ==
Futureface, Wagner's memoir exploring her Burmese American ancestry, was published in April 2018. In 2020, a second version adapted for younger readers was published.

Wagner's second book, The Steal: Four Right-Wing Hard-Liners, One Republican Presidency, and the Raid on America's Courts, was published by Flatiron Books in September 2026. It examines the development of the conservative federal judiciary through the activities of Reagan-era attorney general Ed Meese, businessman and political donor Joseph Coors, conservative activist Paul Weyrich, and Supreme Court nominee Robert Bork.
