= Game Change =

2010 non-fiction book by John Heilemann and Mark Halperin

Game Change: Obama and the Clintons, McCain and Palin, and the Race of a Lifetime
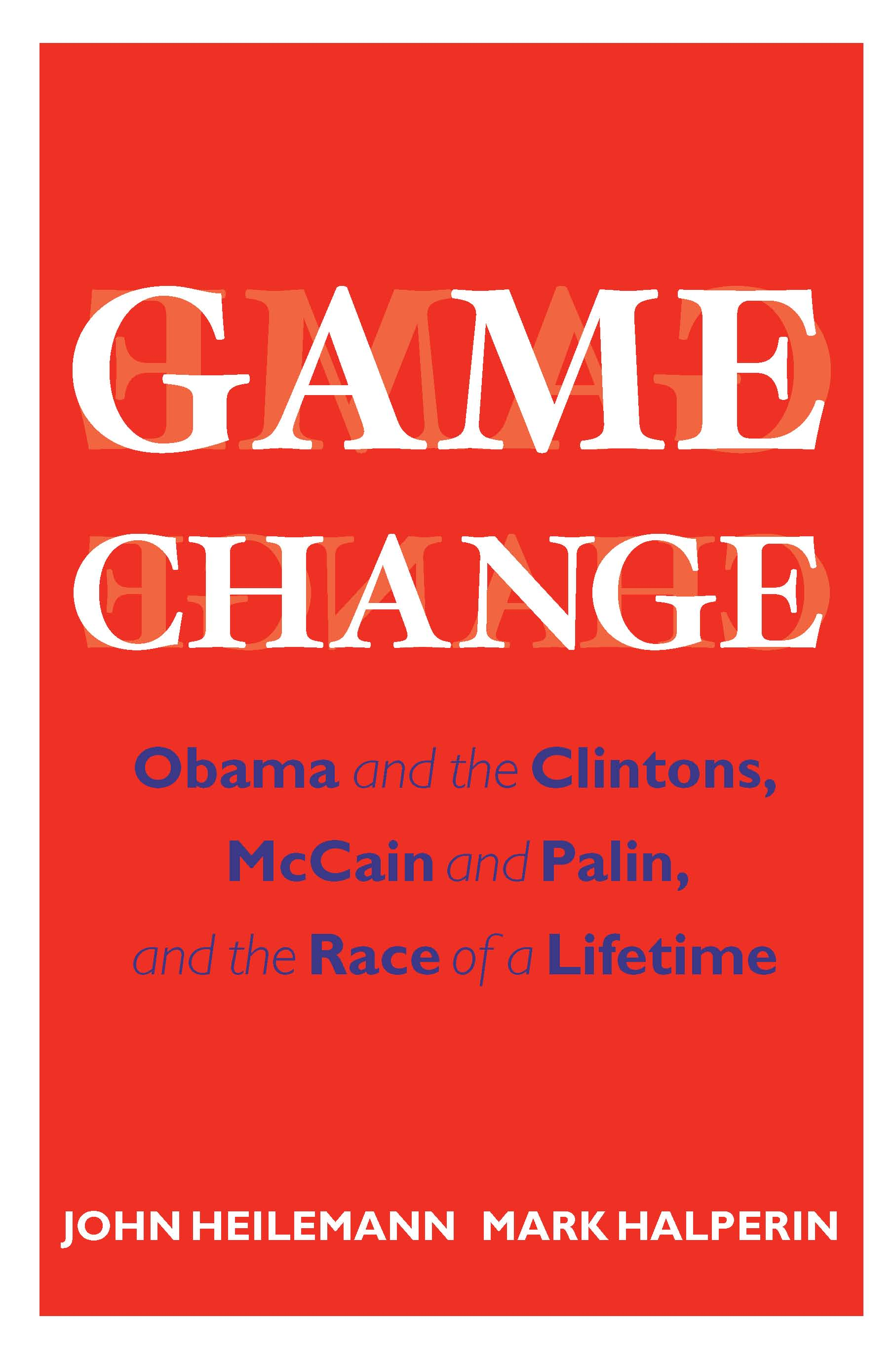
- First edition cover
- Author: John Heilemann and Mark Halperin
- Language: English
- Subject: 2008 United States presidential election
- Genre: Non-fiction
- Publisher: HarperCollins
- Publication date: January 11, 2010
- Publication place: United States
- Media type: Print
- Pages: 448
- ISBN: 978-0-06-196620-0
- Followed by: Double Down: Game Change 2012

Game Change: Obama and the Clintons, McCain and Palin, and the Race of a Lifetime is a book by political journalists John Heilemann and Mark Halperin about the 2008 United States presidential election. Released on January 11, 2010, it was also published in the United Kingdom under the title Race of a Lifetime: How Obama Won the White House. The book is based on interviews with more than 300 people involved in the campaign. It discusses factors including Democratic Party presidential candidate John Edwards' extramarital affair, the relationship between Democratic presidential nominee Barack Obama and his vice presidential running mate Joe Biden, the failure of Republican Party candidate Rudy Giuliani's presidential campaign and Sarah Palin's vice presidential candidacy.

The book is divided into three parts: Part 1 (fourteen chapters) is about the Democratic primary campaign between Obama and Clinton as well as the Edwards affair, Part 2 (three chapters) is about the Republican primary campaign, and Part 3 (six chapters) chronicles the fall campaign between Obama and John McCain.

== Book ==
Game Change included several new revelations about the 2008 campaign. Among them were that Senate Majority Leader Harry Reid and New York Senator Chuck Schumer had privately urged Barack Obama to run for president in the fall of 2006, in hopes that it would energize the Democratic base and improve the party's chances of winning the presidency. The book also details an hour-long meeting between Hillary Clinton and pollster Mark Penn, during which Clinton accused Obama of "playing the race card" and importing people into Iowa to improve his chances at the caucus. The book also alleges that Hillary Clinton wanted to make a bigger issue out of Obama's drug use, but was dissuaded by certain members of her staff. Also during this meeting, she allegedly said, "I hate the choice that the country's faced with. I think it is a terrible choice for our nation."

Heilemann and Halperin wrote in Game Change that Clinton had considered entering the 2004 presidential race, and that polls indicated her odds were encouraging. She was encouraged to run by her husband, former-President Bill Clinton, but their daughter Chelsea Clinton advised her against it. Clinton was also against running because when she was running for senator, she made the voters the promise that she would complete her full senate term. Also in 2006, according to Game Change, advisers to Clinton worked on a strategy to deal with any public disclosure over an affair which some of Hillary Clinton's advisers had believed Bill Clinton was then carrying on. The book did not provide any further details, except that the affair was "a sustained romantic relationship".

Game Change also included details of John Edwards's affair with Rielle Hunter, and his handling of it before it was made public. According to the book, Edwards angrily rejected requests by his advisers to distance himself from Hunter. The book also described, in some depth, Sarah Palin's role in John McCain's campaign. In response to concerns that Palin was depressed and unresponsive to debate training, McCain reportedly suggested debate sessions for Palin be moved from Philadelphia to Sedona, Arizona, so Palin could be closer to her family. McCain aides reportedly were also concerned about Palin's failure to understand basic facts prior to her ABC News interviews with Charles Gibson, including why North Korea and South Korea are separate countries. She also allegedly believed Saddam Hussein was behind the September 11 attacks.

The book ends with Obama being elected President of the United States and reporting on how he offered Clinton the job of United States Secretary of State in his administration. After initially turning Obama down in part out of fear that Bill Clinton would become a distraction for them both, she accepts the job after a late night phone conversation with Obama, who convinces her that she would be the best person for the position.

== Reception ==
Harry Reid was heavily criticized for comments he previously made about Barack Obama, which had not been made public until they were published in Game Change. According to the book, Reid said he believed Obama could become the country's first black president because he was "light-skinned" and had "no Negro dialect, unless he wanted to have one". Reid acknowledged and apologized for the comments, and his apology was accepted by Obama. The disclosure came at a time Reid was facing a difficult reelection campaign in his home state of Nevada. National Republican Senatorial Committee Chair John Cornyn, Republican National Committee Chair Michael Steele, Senate Minority Leader Mitch McConnell and Senate Minority Whip Jon Kyl called on Reid to step down as majority leader for his remarks. Reid ultimately won reelection for his seat.

Also reported for the first time was a comment Bill Clinton supposedly made in trying to convince Ted Kennedy not to back Obama's candidacy but rather that of his wife, Hillary Clinton. Clinton reportedly said to Kennedy that "a few years ago, this guy would have been getting us coffee." There is no evidence that Clinton ever made the remark. However, the alleged belittling of Obama's candidacy supposedly helped lead to Kennedy's endorsement of Obama shortly thereafter. Al Sharpton condemned Clinton's alleged remark, saying, "I think that's far more disturbing [than Senator Reid's comments] because this is someone seeking to stop Mr. Obama's campaign... If someone said that he would have been getting us coffee like that in the context they said he said it, that would be very offensive to me, and I would definitely take Mr. Clinton on".

Critics questioned the lack of explicit sourcing in Game Change, which was done on "deep background" with no sources being identified in any way. This followed the approach made famous in many of Bob Woodward's books. A Poynter Institute journalism ethics scholar said a danger of this method is that "both accuracy and fairness can be in jeopardy when anonymous sources are overused and misused" and that deep background sources "cannot be held easily accountable." Michiko Kakutani of The New York Times wrote that the authors of Game Change "serve up a spicy smorgasbord of observations, revelations and allegations — some that are based on impressive legwork and access, some that simply crystallize rumors and whispers from the campaign trail, and some that are hard to verify independently as more than spin or speculation on the part of unnamed sources." Kakutani and Marc Ambinder of The Atlantic both said that at times the book veered into gossip. The authors defended themselves against such criticism, with Halperin saying they maintained "an incredibly high standard" and that they left material out if it was not verifiable or relevant, and Heilemann saying "We tried to tell a story of the intimate reality of what it's like to run for president. Gossip is that which is unverified ... Everything in our book is factual." The book was also criticized as being the embodiment of insider, establishment journalism.

Sarah Palin has criticized Heilemann and Halperin for Game Change's depiction of her candidacy. Meghan Stapleton, Palin's spokeswoman, suggested Palin's autobiography Going Rogue was a more accurate portrayal of the campaign and Palin's role in it. Jay Carney, Joe Biden's communications director at the time, criticized the authors for not checking directly with any of Biden's staff to verify the accounts in the book, but did not comment on the accounts themselves.

In 2018, Meghan McCain, the daughter of John McCain, condemned the book during a discussion on ABC's The View. She compared the book to Michael Wolff's 2018 book on the Donald Trump White House, Fire and Fury. She said that both books were unethical and were reasons why she did not trust journalists.

== Film adaptation ==
HBO Films produced a film adaptation of Game Change directed by Jay Roach. The film, which focuses primarily on the third part of the book, premiered on March 10, 2012. The film received numerous award nominations, and won four Emmy Awards, including the award for Outstanding Actress in a Miniseries for Julianne Moore, who portrayed Sarah Palin.

In light of sexual harassment charges brought by six women against Halperin, Penguin canceled a 2016 version of his book and HBO dropped its miniseries project based on the book as well.
