= The Circus: Inside the Greatest Political Show on Earth =

American documentary television series

- Also known as: The Circus
- Genre: Documentary
- Presented by: Mark Halperin (seasons 1–2); John Heilemann (seasons 1–8); Mark McKinnon (seasons 1–8); Alex Wagner (seasons 3–7); Jennifer Palmieri (seasons 6–8)
- Country of origin: United States
- Original language: English
- No. of seasons: 8
- No. of episodes: 130

Production
- Running time: 28–30 minutes, 57–61 minutes (specials)
- Production company: Left/Right Productions

Original release
- Network: Showtime
- Release: January 17, 2016 – November 12, 2023

The Circus is an American documentary television series initially following the 2016 presidential race, the Trump administration, the 2020 United States presidential election, and then the Biden administration. It was produced by Left/Right Productions, a North Road company, for Showtime.

The docu-series premiered on January 17, 2016, and focused on the 2016 U.S. presidential election, January to November. It was renewed for a second season, which premiered on March 19, 2017, and focused on President Trump's first 100 days. It returned on April 15, 2018 for a third season, and focused on the mid-term elections, with CBS News anchor Alex Wagner stepping in as co-host to replace Mark Halperin, who was replaced on January 3, 2018, by the show, after sexual harassment allegations. Jennifer Palmieri joined as guest host beginning October 13, 2019, with season four episode twelve, Desperate Times, Desperate Measures, and joined as a permanent co-host in season 6.

The first half of the fifth season premiered on January 26, 2020. The second half of the fifth season premiered August 16, 2020. The sixth season premiered on January 10, 2021. The seventh season premiered on March 6, 2022. The second half of the seventh season premiered on September 25, 2022. The eighth and final season premiered on February 26, 2023.

On November 7, 2023, it was announced the series would come to an end after eight seasons, with the final episode airing on November 12, 2023.

== Episodes ==
=== Series overview ===
Season	Episodes	Originally released	
Season	Episodes	First released	Last released
1	26	January 17, 2016	November 13, 2016
2	8	March 19, 2017	May 7, 2017
3	15	April 15, 2018	November 11, 2018
4	16	January 27, 2019	November 10, 2019
5	21	January 26, 2020	November 8, 2020
6	16	January 10, 2021	November 7, 2021
7	16	March 6, 2022	November 13, 2022
8	12	February 26, 2023	November 12, 2023

=== Season 1: Inside the Greatest Political Show on Earth (2016) ===
No. overall	No. in season	Title	Original release date
1	1	"The Outsiders"	January 17, 2016
2	2	"Prisoner's Dilema"	January 24, 2016
3	3	"Tension City"	January 31, 2016
4	4	"The Big Mo"	February 7, 2016
5	5	"The Winnowing"	February 14, 2016
6	6	"Fear and Loathing"	February 21, 2016
7	7	"Confidence Game"	February 28, 2016
8	8	"The Reckoning"	March 6, 2016
9	9	"Dead or Alive"	March 13, 2016
10	10	"High Hopes"	March 20, 2016
11	11	"Home and Abroad"	March 27, 2016
12	12	"On, Wisconsin"	April 3, 2016
13	13	"Recap"	April 10, 2016
14	14	"Game On"	July 10, 2016
15	15	"Veepstakes"	July 17, 2016
16	16	"Trump Show"	July 24, 2016
17	17	"In the Arena"	July 31, 2016
18	18	"Closing the Gap"	September 11, 2016
19	19	"Fit to Serve"	September 18, 2016
20	20	"Battleground"	September 25, 2016
21	21	"The Newsrooms"	October 2, 2016
22	22	"Tale of the Tape"	October 16, 2016
23	23	"From Russia With Love"	October 23, 2016
24	24	"His Word as a Biden"	October 30, 2016
25	25	"Nobody F***ing Knows"	November 6, 2016
26	26	"President Trump"	November 13, 2016

=== Season 2: Inside the Biggest Story on Earth (2017) ===
No. overall	No. in season	Title	Original release date
27	1	"Shocking But Not Surprising"	March 19, 2017
28	2	"Checking and Balancing"	March 26, 2017
29	3	"How's He Doing?"	April 2, 2017
30	4	"The Whole World Is Watching"	April 9, 2017
31	5	"Recess Reset"	April 16, 2017
32	6	"The Resistance"	April 23, 2017
33	7	"Learning Curve"	April 30, 2017
34	8	"Looking Back and Moving On"	May 7, 2017

=== Season 3: Inside the Wildest Political Show on Earth (2018) ===
No. overall	No. in season	Title	Original release date
35	1	"The Looking Glass War"	April 15, 2018
36	2	"Too Many Lawyers"	April 22, 2018
37	3	"Man of the World"	April 29, 2018
38	4	"Trump Country"	May 6, 2018
39	5	"War and Peace"	May 13, 2018
40	6	"Their Brand Is Crisis"	May 20, 2018
41	7	"The Gathering Storm"	September 16, 2018
42	8	"Burden of Proof"	September 23, 2018
43	9	"Judgment Day"	September 30, 2018
44	10	"The Verdict"	October 7, 2018
45	11	"California Dreaming"	October 14, 2018
46	12	"Senatorial Combat"	October 21, 2018
47	13	"Black and White"	October 28, 2018
48	14	"A Place Called Fear"	November 4, 2018
49	15	"Mother(F***er) of All Midterms"	November 11, 2018

=== Season 4: Inside the Wildest Political Show on Earth (2019) ===
No. overall	No. in season	Title	Original release date
50	1	"New World Disorder"	January 27, 2019
51	2	"Circling Vultures"	February 3, 2019
52	3	"The State of Our Union Is…"	February 10, 2019
53	4	"2020 Is Here"	February 17, 2019
54	5	"States of Emergency"	February 24, 2019
55	6	"The Big Split"	March 3, 2019
56	7	"To the Left"	March 10, 2019
57	8	"What the F... Happens Next?"	March 17, 2019
58	9	"The People on That Stage"	September 22, 2019
59	10	"Across the Rubicon"	September 29, 2019
60	11	"Impeachmentland"	October 6, 2019
61	12	"Desperate Times, Desperate Measures"	October 13, 2019
62	13	"The Widening Gyre"	October 20, 2019
63	14	"The Deep State"	October 27, 2019
64	15	"Field of Dreams"	November 3, 2019
65	16	"Here Be Dragons"	November 10, 2019

=== Season 5: Inside the Craziest Political Campaign on Earth (2020) ===
No. overall	No. in season	Title	Original release date
66	1	"Obligations and Opportunities"	January 26, 2020
67	2	"Closing Arguments"	February 2, 2020
68	3	"Clusterf**k"	February 9, 2020
69	4	"Unfinished Business"	February 16, 2020
70	5	"What Happens in Vegas"	February 23, 2020
71	6	"On the Boil"	March 1, 2020
72	7	"Super Duper Tuesday"	March 8, 2020
73	8	"The Cruelest Month"	March 15, 2020
74	9	"The New Abnormal"	August 16, 2020
75	10	"Unconventional"	August 23, 2020
76	11	"Party of One"	August 30, 2020
77	12	"Law and Disorder"	September 6, 2020
78	13	"Going Postal"	September 13, 2020
79	14	"Force Majeure"	September 20, 2020
80	15	"Full Court Press"	September 27, 2020
81	16	"October Surprise"	October 4, 2020
82	17	"Crisis Mismanagement"	October 11, 2020
83	18	"Steal This Election"	October 18, 2020
84	19	"End Games"	October 25, 2020
85	20	"Landslide?"	November 1, 2020
86	21	"Who the F... Are We?"	November 8, 2020

=== Season 6: Inside the Greatest Political Show on Earth (2021) ===
No. overall	No. in season	Title	Original release date
87	1	"Reigning Chaos"	January 10, 2021
88	2	"Clear and Present Danger"	January 17, 2021
89	3	"President Biden"	January 24, 2021
90	4	"Rubber Meets Road"	January 31, 2021
91	5	"Dysfunction Junction"	February 7, 2021
92	6	"Persona Non Grata"	February 14, 2021
93	7	"Being Green"	February 21, 2021
94	8	"Points on the Board"	February 28, 2021
95	9	"Calling the Shots"	September 19, 2021
96	10	"The Biden Doctrine"	September 26, 2021
97	11	"It's All Happening"	October 3, 2021
98	12	"Lone Star Blues"	October 10, 2021
99	13	"Coup Part Two"	October 17, 2021
100	14	"Virginia Is For..."	October 24, 2021
101	15	"Big F...ing Deal"	October 31, 2021
102	16	"The Broken Place"	November 7, 2021

=== Season 7: Inside the Greatest Political Show on Earth (2022) ===
"On the Brink", season seven premiere

No. overall	No. in season	Title	Original release date
103	1	"On the Brink"	March 6, 2022
104	2	"The Escalation Ladder"	March 13, 2022
105	3	"The Information War"	March 20, 2022
106	4	"The Nuclear Option"	March 27, 2022
107	5	"The Home Front"	April 3, 2022
108	6	"There Will Be Blood"	April 10, 2022
109	7	"Keystone Chaos"	April 17, 2022
110	8	"Tip of the Spear"	April 24, 2022
111	9	"Not in Kansas Anymore"	September 25, 2022
112	10	"Rule of Law"	October 2, 2022
113	11	"State of Denial"	October 9, 2022
114	12	"Buckeyes and Bulldogs"	October 16, 2022
115	13	"This Land Is Greene-Land"	October 23, 2022
116	14	"The Main Event"	October 30, 2022
117	15	"Here Comes the Flood"	November 6, 2022
118	16	"Rip Tides"	November 13, 2022

=== Season 8: Inside the Greatest Political Show on Earth (2023) ===
No. overall	No. in season	Title	Original release date
119	1	"The Year of Living Dangerously"	February 26, 2023
120	2	"Off to the Races"	March 5, 2023
121	3	"Kevin's House"	March 12, 2023
122	4	"Fake News?"	March 19, 2023
123	5	"Wheels of Justice"	March 26, 2023
124	6	"Nothing But the Truth"	April 2, 2023
125	7	"Exhaustion, Depression and Dread...Oy Vey"	October 8, 2023
126	8	"Piercing the Bubble"	October 15, 2023
127	9	"The Crucible"	October 22, 2023
128	10	"This Thing of His"	October 29, 2023
129	11	"The AI Election"	November 5, 2023
130	12	"Life During Wartime"	November 12, 2023

== Reception ==
The Circus received generally positive reviews from critics. On the review aggregator Rotten Tomatoes, season 1 has a rating of 75%, based on 12 reviews, with an average rating of 7/10. The consensus reads: "The Circus reveals a more human side of the candidates and paints a clear picture of how grueling life can be on the campaign trail, yet the show fails to provide the type of candid analysis and discourse it alludes to during this incredibly unique and cantankerous election cycle." On Metacritic, the series has a score of 75 out of 100, based on 5 reviews, indicating "Generally favorable reviews".
