= List of programs broadcast by MS NOW =

This is a list of programs broadcast by MS NOW. MS NOW (formerly MSNBC) is an American news cable and satellite television network that provides news coverage and political commentary. The network was established as a joint venture between NBC News and Microsoft, was launched on 1996.

== Current programming ==
=== Weekday programs ===
Time	Program	Hosted by	Location
5:00 a.m.	Way Too Early	Ali Vitali	Washington, D.C. / New York City / Remote-Miami
6:00 a.m.	Morning Joe	Joe Scarborough; Mika Brzezinski; Willie Geist (Note: Geist regularly co-hosts from Tuesdays to Fridays.); Jonathan Lemire (8 a.m. hour)	Washington, D.C. / New York City / Remote-Miami
9:00 a.m.	Money, Power, Politics with Stephanie Ruhle	Stephanie Ruhle	New York City
11:00 a.m.	State of Play with Peter Alexander	Peter Alexander	Washington D.C.
12:00 p.m.	On the Line with Alicia Menendez	Alicia Menendez	New York City
2:00 p.m.	The Moment with Katy Tur	Katy Tur	New York City
4:00 p.m.	Deadline: White House	Nicolle Wallace	New York City
6:00 p.m.	The Beat with Ari Melber	Ari Melber	New York City
7:00 p.m.	The Weeknight	Luke Russert; Symone Sanders-Townsend; Michael Steele	Washington, D.C.
8:00 p.m.	All In with Chris Hayes	Chris Hayes	New York City
9:00 p.m.	The Rachel Maddow Show (Monday)	Rachel Maddow	New York City
9:00 p.m.	The Briefing with Jen Psaki (Tuesday–Friday)	Jen Psaki	Washington, D.C.
10:00 p.m.	The Last Word with Lawrence O'Donnell	Lawrence O'Donnell (Note: O'Donnell hosts from Mondays to Thursdays, with rotating guest hosts on Fridays.)	New York City
11:00 p.m.	The 11th Hour with Ali Velshi	Ali Velshi	New York City

=== Weekend programs ===
Time	Program	Hosted by	Location
7:00 a.m.	The Weekend	Jonathan Capehart; Eugene Daniels; Jackie Alemany	Washington D.C.
10:00 a.m.	Connect with Jacob Soboroff	Jacob Soboroff	Los Angeles
1:00 p.m.	The Assignment With Antonia Hylton	Antonia Hylton	New York City
4:00 p.m.	The Beat: Weekend (Saturday)	Ari Melber (re-run)	New York City
4:00 p.m.	Deadline: White House: Weekend (Sunday)	Nicolle Wallace (re-run)	New York City
5:00 p.m.	PoliticsNation	Al Sharpton	New York City

=== Special ===
- Dateline Extra
- MS NOW Films
- Sky News on MS NOW (Note: Airs during breaking news events of major significance outside primetime hours.)

== Former programming ==
=== Weekday programs ===
- The Abrams Report
- Alan Keyes Is Making Sense
- Alex Wagner Tonight
- Andrea Mitchell Reports
- Ashleigh Banfield on Location
- The Big Show with Keith Olbermann
- Buchanan & Press
- Connected: Coast to Coast
- Countdown with Keith Olbermann
- The Cycle
- The Daily Rundown
- Deborah Norville Tonight
- Donahue
- Dr. Nancy
- The Dylan Ratigan Show
- The Ed Show
- For the Record with Greta
- Hardball with Chris Matthews
- HomePage
- Imus in the Morning
- InterNight
- Jansing and Company
- Martin Bashir
- Morning Joe First Look
- The Most with Alison Stewart
- MS NOW Reports
- MSNBC at the Movies
- MTP Daily (moved to NBC News Now)
- The News with Brian Williams
- NewsNation with Tamron Hall
- Now with Alex Wagner
- Race for the White House
- The Reid Report
- The ReidOut
- Rita Cosby: Live & Direct
- Ronan Farrow Daily
- The Savage Nation
- Scarborough Country
- The Site
- Time and Again
- Tucker
- Up Late with Alec Baldwin
- Velshi & Ruhle
- Verdict with Dan Abrams
- With All Due Respect

=== Weekend programs ===
- Alex Witt Reports
- AM Joy
- American Voices with Alicia Menendez
- The Cross Connection with Tiffany Cross
- Disrupt with Karen Finney
- Hugh Hewitt
- Jesse Ventura's America
- Kasie DC
- Lockup
- Melissa Harris-Perry
- MS NOW Reports
- Saturday Night Politics with Donny Deutsch
- Symone
- Taking the Hill
- The Mehdi Hasan Show
- The Week with Joshua Johnson
- Weekend Morning Line with Patti Ann Browne
- The Weekend: Primetime
- Up with David Gura
- Weekends with Maury and Connie
- The Katie Phang Show
- The Saturday/Sunday Show with Jonathan Capeheart
- Ayman
- Your Business with JJ Ramberg
- Velshi

== Podcasts ==
=== Ongoing ===
- Clock It (2026-present, hosted by Symone Sanders Townsend and Eugene Daniels)
- The Best People with Nicolle Wallace (2026–present)
- Main Justice with Andrew Weissman and Mary McCord (2023–present)
- Why Is This Happening? The Chris Hayes Podcast (2018–present)

=== Completed ===
- So You Wanna Be President? with Chris Matthews (2020)
- The Oath with Chuck Rosenberg (2019–2021)
- Rachel Maddow Presents: Bag Man (2018)
- American Radical (2021, hosted by Ayman Mohyeldin)
- The Revolution with Steve Kornacki (2022)
- Trumpland with Alex Wagner (2025)
- Velshi Banned Book Club (2023–2024)
- Rachel Maddow Presents: Déjà News (2023)
- Into America with Trymaine Lee (2020–2024)
- Rachel Maddow Presents: Ultra (2022–2024)
- The Blueprint with Jen Psaki (2025)

== See also ==
- History of MSNBC: 1996–2007
- History of MSNBC: 2008–2015
- MSNBC Live Streaming
