= The Weekend (2024 TV series) =

American political news panel discussion program

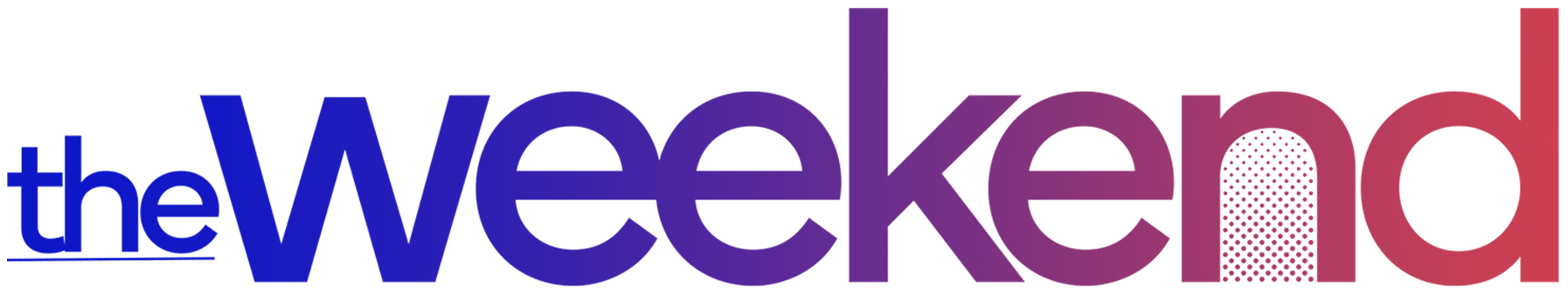
- Genre: Political news program
- Presented by: Jonathan Capehart; Eugene Daniels; Jacqueline Alemany; Alicia Menendez (2024–2026); Symone Sanders-Townsend; Michael Steele
- Country of origin: United States
- Original language: English

Production
- Executive producer: Robert Zeliger
- Camera setup: Multi-camera

Original release
- Network: MSNBC
- Release: January 13, 2024 – November 9, 2025
- Network: MS NOW
- Release: November 15, 2025 – present

Related
- The Weeknight

The Weekend is an American political news panel discussion program broadcast by MS NOW. Premiering on January 13, 2024, the series is currently hosted by Jonathan Capehart, Jacqueline Alemany, and Eugene Daniels.

The series was originally hosted by Alicia Menendez, Symone Sanders-Townsend, and Michael Steele; the trio moved to a weeknight spin-off—aptly titled The Weeknight—in May 2025. MSNBC also introduced a second spin-off, The Weekend: Primetime, with a separate panel of Ayman Mohyeldin, Catherine Rampell, Antonia Hylton, and Elise Jordan.

== History ==
The program was announced in November 2023 as part of a revamp of MSNBC's weekend lineup. Hosted by Alicia Menendez, Symone Sanders-Townsend (who both previously hosted the weekend shows American Voices and Symone, respectively), and Michael Steele, MSNBC president Rashida Jones stated that The Weekend would feature "provide thoughtful analysis and coverage on the state of our country from three trusted voices familiar to the MSNBC audience."

In February 2025, new MSNBC president Rebecca Kutler announced that Menendez, Sanders-Townsend, and Steele would move to a new evening show to replace Joy Reid's The ReidOut. It was concurrently announced that The Weekend would receive both a new panel, as well as a new evening edition with a separate panel. The new show—The Weeknight—premiered on May 5, 2025. On May 3, the existing morning edition of The Weekend expanded to three hours and debuted a new panel, featuring Jonathan Capehart, Jacqueline Alemany, and newly-named senior Washington correspondent Eugene Daniels. The Advocate noted that the presence of Capehart and Daniels made The Weekend the first program on American national TV to feature two openly gay Black American men as hosts.

=== The Weekend: Primetime ===
The Weekend Primetime
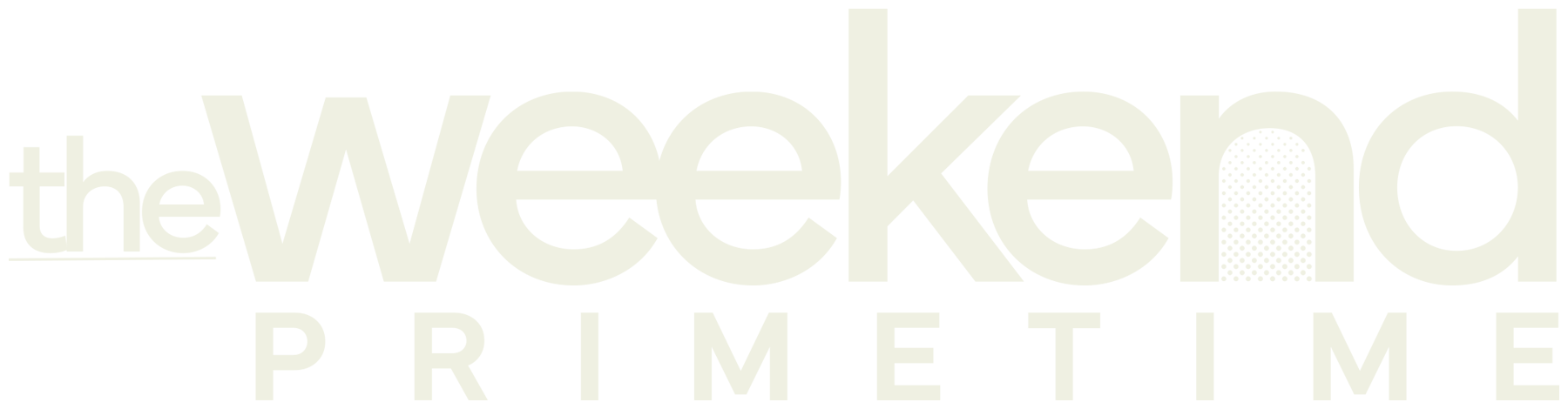
- Genre: Political news program
- Presented by: Ayman Mohyeldin; Antonia Hylton; Elise Jordan; Catherine Rampell
- Country of origin: United States
- Original language: English

Production
- Executive producer: Joy Fowlin
- Camera setup: Multi-camera

Original release
- Network: MSNBC
- Release: May 3 – November 9, 2025
- Network: MS NOW
- Release: November 15, 2025 – June 27, 2026

MSNBC also premiered The Weekend: Primetime, which was hosted by Ayman Mohyeldin (who previously hosted the weekend show Ayman), Catherine Rampell, Antonia Hylton, and Elise Jordan.

On June 26, 2026, the program was cancelled, with its last episode airing the next day. The change came as part of cuts to live weekend programming by MS NOW; all four panelists will remain with the network, and it was announced that Hylton would succeed the departing Alex Witt as the network's weekend afternoon host later in the year. The Weekend: Primetime's executive producer Joy Fowlin will also move to Hylton's new program.

Preceded by Morning Joe: Weekend	MS NOW Weekend Morning Lineup; 7:00–10:00 a.m. (ET)	Succeeded by Connect with Jacob Soboroff

Preceded by PoliticsNation with Al Sharpton	MS NOW Weekend Evening Lineup; 6:00–9:00 p.m. (ET)	Succeeded by The Rachel Maddow Show Weekend (Saturday); The Briefing Weekend (Sunday)
