= The 11th Hour with Ali Velshi =

American news program

- Also known as: The 11th Hour with Brian Williams (2016–2021); The 11th Hour with Stephanie Ruhle (2021–2026)
- Genre: News program; Political journalism
- Created by: Phil Griffin
- Presented by: Brian Williams; Stephanie Ruhle; Ali Velshi
- Country of origin: United States
- Original language: English
- No. of seasons: 11

Production
- Executive producers: Patrick Burkey (2016–2017); Colleen King (2018–2019); Jack Bohrer (2019–2020); Jonathan Wald (2020–2023); Patrick McMenamin (2023–2026); Rebekah Dryden (2026-present)
- Producer: Julie Morse
- Production location: New York City
- Camera setup: Multi-camera
- Running time: 60 minutes

Original release
- Network: MSNBC
- Release: September 6, 2016 – November 14, 2025
- Network: MS NOW
- Release: November 17, 2025 – present

Related
- The News with Brian Williams

The 11th Hour with Ali Velshi is an American nightly news and politics television program airing weeknights at 11:00 pm ET on MS NOW that premiered on September 6, 2016. It was originally hosted by Brian Williams until December 9, 2021. The show began utilizing a rotating list of guest hosts on December 13, 2021. Stephanie Ruhle was named the subsequent full time host on March 2, 2022. She left the show on June 12, 2026, with Ali Velshi becoming host on June 15, 2026.

== History and format ==
=== Brian Williams (2016–2021) ===
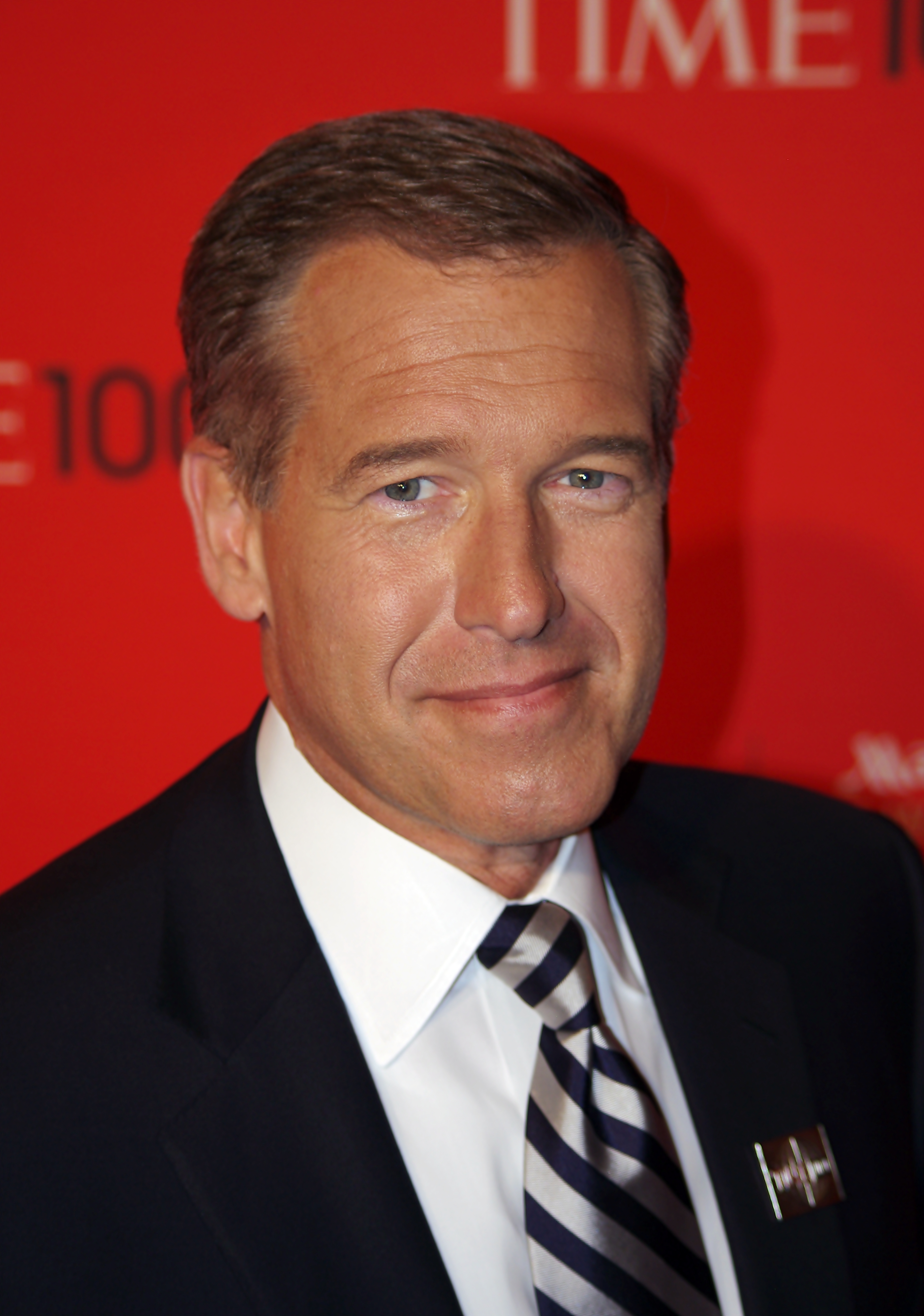
Brian Williams was host of The 11th Hour from 2016 to 2021, following his departure from the NBC network that year, rotating guest hosts began on December 13 and continued until March 1

The show launched on September 6, 2016, as a temporary program wrapping up the election news of the day, while previewing stories that will be top-ticket news items the next morning. It replaced a rerun of All In with Chris Hayes.

The program was Williams' second show in MSNBC's primetime schedule, as he formerly hosted The News with Brian Williams, which aired on the network from 1996 to 2002 before moving to CNBC. Originally the program was Monday to Thursday only, and despite its name, aired for only a half hour. The last half hour of Hardball aired following the half hour program. At times the program was extended due to breaking news coverage. The program expanded to Friday nights in January and on March 20, 2017, was extended to one hour daily. On April 13, 2017, MSNBC officially extended the program to an hour long despite its initial billing as a temporary program.

Former title card, used during Brian Williams's tenure from 2016 to 2021

Under Williams, the program primarily featured interviews with reporters covering the major stories of the evening, panels composed of former government officials and subject matter experts, and the occasional politician. Williams eschewed the conflict-ridden panels of competing opinion shows. Interviews with newsmakers were either live or to tape as close to air time as possible, to maintain immediacy. Similar to the original Nightline which focused on the Iran hostage crisis, the program focused primarily on the actions of the presidency of Donald Trump and Williams led each broadcast noting the number of days since the Trump presidency began, as well as how many days remain before the upcoming election. During the presidency of Joe Biden began, the program counted the number of days of the Biden administration and mostly discussed Biden administration actions. The show typically ends with The Last Thing Before We Go as the final segment, which typically features a missed-out news story along with a closing statement from the host.

NBC News contributors Nicolle Wallace and Eugene Robinson provided commentary on most of the 2016 editions. Wallace also served as a substitute anchor in Williams' absence. Wallace's duties on the program resulted in her hosting her own show, Deadline: White House.

Williams announced on the November 9, 2021, episode of The 11th Hour with Brian Williams that he would be leaving NBC News and MSNBC at the expiration of his contract the following month, after five years hosting the show and 28 years with the networks. Williams' final broadcast was December 9, on which he announced that the show would continue to air and have rotating guest hosts such as Ali Velshi and Chris Jansing from December 13, 2021 to February 25, 2022.

=== Stephanie Ruhle (2022–2026) ===
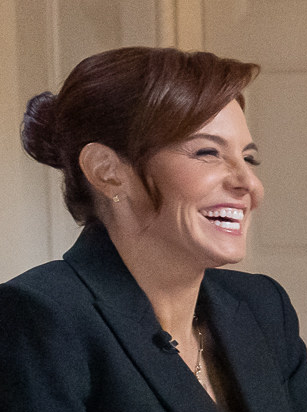
Stephanie Ruhle became host on March 2, 2022.

On January 27, 2022, it was reported that Stephanie Ruhle, who had been part of the rotation while hosting MSNBC Reports will become The 11th Hour's new permanent host. The first episode with Ruhle as permanent host aired on March 2.

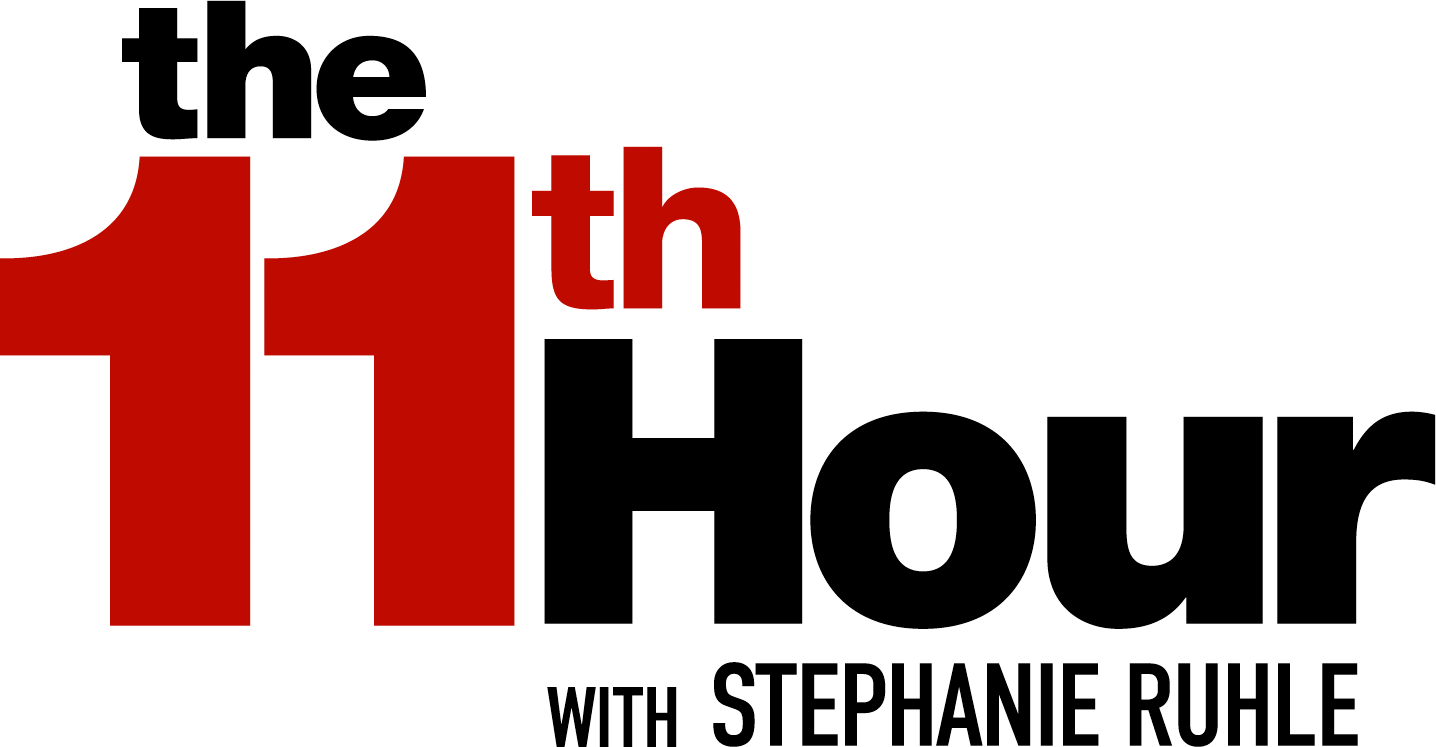
Logo for Stephanie Ruhle's era

Under Ruhle, the show's "A-Block" features a tease, a short monologue, and a lengthy discussion with its "Lead-off Panel" of typically 3 guests and Ruhle. The rest of the show features segments focused on the day's developments in politics and economics. However, the program no longer counts the number of days of a president's administration.

The show also introduces new segments such as Money, Power, and Politics focusing on the role of money in politics (later become the name of Ruhle's new morning news show), and Keynote as one-on-one interview with a special guest. Each Fridays also introduces a new format titled "Nightcap", which recaps of all the stories from the day with a panel of guests throughout the hour. The "Nightcap" format expands to Mondays, Wednesdays, and Fridays after the 2024 United States presidential election, which the Friday edition re-airs on Saturday nights. Ruhle also retained The Last Thing Before We Go, covering good news-themed segment before the show concludes.

On May 27, 2022, following the Robb Elementary School shooting, the show aired a special titled Enough Is Enough that discusses gun culture in the United States.

=== Ali Velshi (since 2026) ===
On March 18, 2026, it was announced that Ruhle would move to host a new daytime program titled Money, Power, Politics with Stephanie Ruhle and Ali Velshi would leave his own weekend morning program to succeed her as host of the program starting in June. Ruhle's final show as host of The 11th Hour aired on June 12, 2026. Ruhle's 11th Hour executive producer Patrick McMenamin also moved with her, while Velshi's executive producer Rebekah Dryden joined the program.

== Broadcast ==
The show is typically broadcast from MSNBC's Studio 3A at its headquarters at 30 Rockefeller Plaza, before moving to MS NOW's headquarters concurrently with the network rebrand. During breaking news coverage that may warrant it, The 11th Hour will broadcast live past midnight EST, which in turn pre-empts a rerun of The Rachel Maddow Show (Mondays) or The Briefing with Jen Psaki (Tuesdays through Fridays).

Guest hosts for The 11th Hour include Alicia Menendez, Melissa Murray, Symone Sanders-Townsend, Catherine Rampell, and Ayman Mohyeldin.

Preceded by The Last Word with Lawrence O'Donnell	MS NOW Weekday lineup 11:00 PM – 12:00 AM; 2:00 AM – 3:00 AM (replay)	Succeeded by The Rachel Maddow Show (Monday) (replay); The Briefing with Jen Psaki (Tuesday-Friday) (replay) (Following First Airing)
Preceded by The Last Word with Lawrence O'Donnell	MS NOW Weekday lineup 11:00 PM – 12:00 AM; 2:00 AM – 3:00 AM (replay)	The Weeknight (Tuesday) (replay); All In with Chris Hayes (Wednesday-Friday) (replay); Dateline Extra (Saturday) (replay) (Following Second Airing)
