= Rebecca Kutler =

American journalist and executive

- Kutler at the 2026 Status Summit
- Born: July 30, 1979 (age 47)
- Spouse: Dan Gilgoff
- Children: 3

Rebecca Kutler is the president of the cable news network MS NOW. Kutler has previously worked as the senior vice president of CNN. She has received an Emmy Award for Outstanding Live Coverage.

== Early life ==
Rebecca Kutler was born to a Jewish family on July 30, 1979, in Pennsylvania, United States. She grew up in Philadelphia's Center City neighborhood before her family moved to Montgomery County.

== Education ==
Kutler earned a Bachelor of Arts in political communication from The George Washington University in 2001 and a Master of Science in journalism from Columbia University. She delivered George Washington University's 2026 commencement address.

== Career ==
Kutler spent more than two decades at CNN, where she started on the production team of Wolf Blitzer's Late Edition. She helped develop shows such as The Messy Truth with Van Jones and The Axe Files. She was a supervising producer on the CNN film, "We Will Rise," and served as an executive producer for Don Lemon.

As a talent and development executive, Kutler hired Abby Phillip and Andrew McCabe, and was involved in the development of Phillip's and Jones' on-air careers. Later, Kutler was the executive producer of John King, USA, a television news show hosted by John King that aired on CNN from 2010 to 2012. In 2024, she was an executive producer of The Sing Sing Chronicles, an American documentary series.

The Los Angeles Times reported that Kutler had been considered as a potential candidate for a leadership role at CNN before she left for MSNBC in 2022. Kutler was the senior vice president for content strategy at MSNBC and became the interim president in January 2025 when Rashida Jones resigned from the post of president. Kutler was named president of MSNBC on a permanent basis in February 2025.

Under Kutler's tenure as president, MSNBC expanded its newsgathering operations ahead of its spin-off from NBCUniversal into Versant and cancelled multiple shows, including The ReidOut, Alex Wagner Tonight, Ayman, The Katie Phang Show, and The Saturday/Sunday Show. The resulting show cancellations, announced in February 2025, produced lay-offs and invitations to reapply for new jobs internally, leading MSNBC anchor Rachel Maddow to comment on-air with respect to the cancellations of shows anchored by predominantly people of color and the personnel reorganization. Alex Wagner stayed with the network as a senior political analyst after her program ended. Ayman Mohyeldin became a co-anchor of a new weekend evening program, The Weekend: Primetime, which debuted in May 2025. Kutler also launched an expanded version of The Weekend on weekend mornings, The Weekend Primetime on weekend evenings, The Weeknight on weeknight slots, and rebranding Inside with Jen Psaki as The Briefing with Jen Psaki.

On August 18, 2025, MSNBC announced a rebrand to "MS NOW" (a backronym of "My Source [for] News, Opinion, [and the] World") to remove the overt use of the NBC trademarks, name and logo. Kutler wrote in a memo, "During this time of transition, NBCUniversal decided that our brand requires a new, separate identity. This decision now allows us to set our own course and assert our independence as we continue to build our own modern newsgathering operation."

Rather than pay a reported $60 million annual fee to continue utilizing NBC News studios and personnel, Kutler initiated construction on newsrooms of its own in Washington and New York. Media observers cited the plan's similarity to "the ethos of a startup," noting that the new editorial independence helped attract new talent to the network.

On September 10, 2025, MSNBC political analyst Matthew Dowd was fired for appraising Charlie Kirk on the day of his death as "one of the most divisive, especially divisive younger figures in this, who is constantly sort of pushing this sort of hate speech or sort of aimed at certain groups. And I always go back to, hateful thoughts lead to hateful words, which then lead to hateful actions." Kutler issued an apology on behalf of MSNBC.

In December 2025, Kutler outlined plans for the network's first membership-based, direct-to-consumer product. The plans highlighted access to network talent through live and virtual events, curated content, and moderated online discussion spaces.

Over the following year, ratings recovered, with June 2026 marking seven consecutive months of year-over-year audience growth. The network's weekday prime-time programming averaged 1.3 million viewers across the first half of 2026, an 8 percent increase over the same period a year earlier. In the week of June 1, 2026, its prime-time audience gained 1 percent in total viewers and 11 percent in the 25-54 demographic, compared to the same period a year earlier, with total-day viewership up 3 percent and 12 percent, respectively.

On digital platforms, the network drew 3.5 billion YouTube views in 2025 through November, surpassing the combined 2025 YouTube viewership of ABC News, CBS News, and NBC News, reaching 7.4 billion total views across YouTube and TikTok in 2025.

In June 2026, MS NOW introduced a new weekday schedule, with most changes taking effect on June 15. Ali Velshi, a longtime weekend host, took over The 11th Hour. Stephanie Ruhle moved from that program to a new morning show, Money, Power, Politics with Stephanie Ruhle. Morning Joe returned to a three-hour format. Alicia Menendez left The Weeknight to host a new noon program, On the Line with Alicia Menendez. Luke Russert joined The Weeknight as a full-time anchor. On weekends, Connect with Jacob Soboroff debuted as the first MS NOW program to originate from Los Angeles. The network also hired former NBC News correspondent Peter Alexander to anchor the weekday 11am hour and to serve as its chief national reporter. Kutler also reached a deal with Crooked Media to compile video highlights of the company's podcasts for broadcast on weekends.

== Personal life ==
She is married to Dan Gilgoff, religion reporter for CNN. Kutler has three children.

In October 2025, Kutler announced that she had been diagnosed with breast cancer. She completed chemotherapy in February 2026, and her doctors described her prognosis as good.
