= Ayman Mohyeldin =

Egyptian political commentator and former journalist

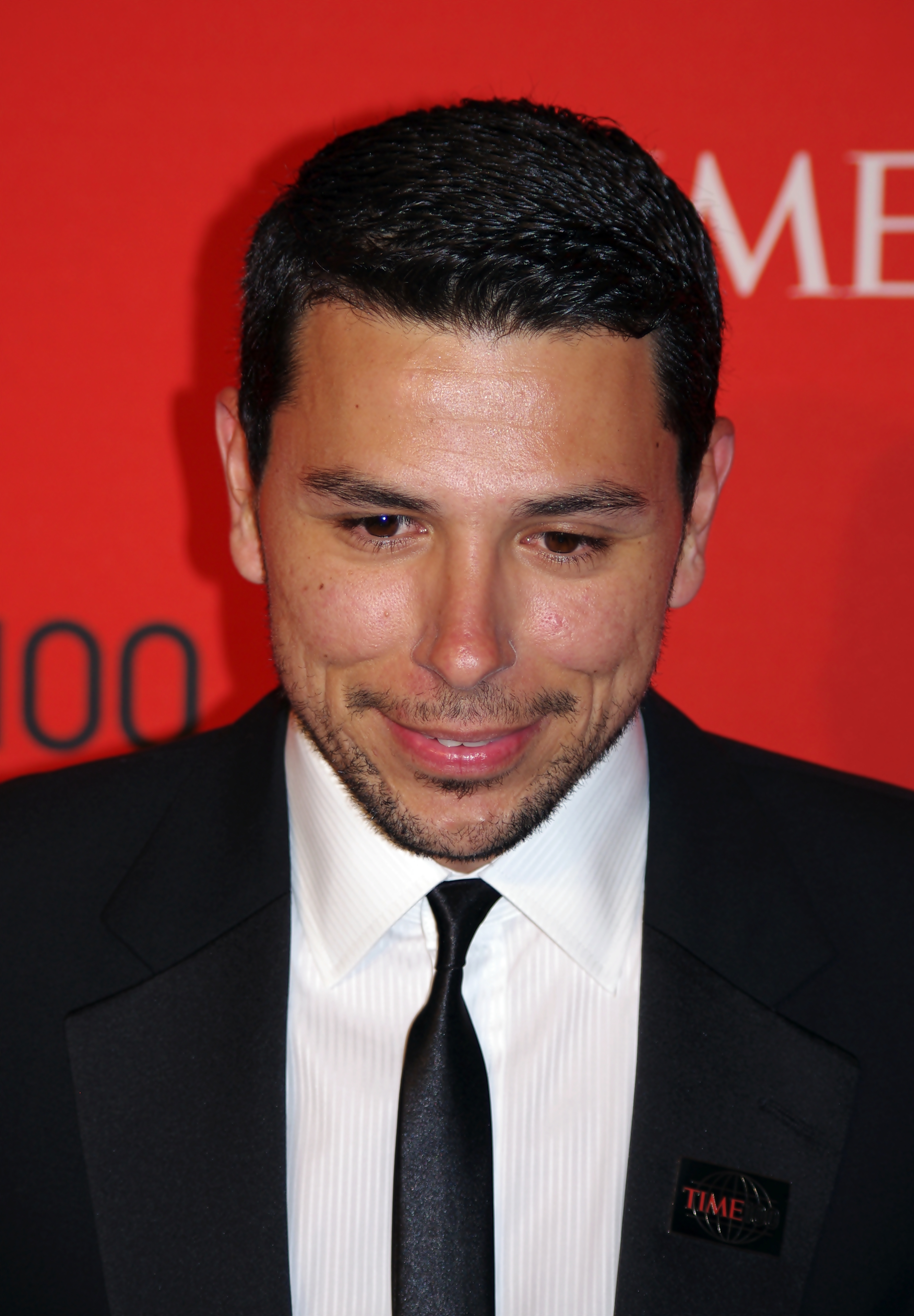
- Mohyeldin at the 2011 Time 100 gala
- Born: April 18, 1979 (age 47); Cairo, Egypt
- Citizenship: American
- Education: American University (BA, MA)
- Occupations: Political commentator and journalist
- Employer: Versant
- Spouse: Kenza Fourati (m. 2016)
- Children: 2

Ayman Mohyeldin (Arabic: أيمن محيي الدين, IPA: [ˈʔæjmæn ˈmoħj edˈdiːn]) is an Egyptian-American journalist, anchor and political commentator based in New York for NBC News and MS NOW. Previously the anchor of an MSNBC weekday afternoon show, Ayman Mohyeldin Reports (formerly MSNBC Live with Ayman Mohyeldin), he hosted Ayman on weekend evenings on MSNBC, and Fridays on Peacock. The show aired its final broadcast in late April 2025. Mohyeldin also co-hosted The Weekend: Primetime with Elise Jordan, Catherine Rampell and Antonia Hylton. As of late June 2026, the show has aired its final broadcast but he remains with MS NOW. He previously worked for Al Jazeera and CNN. He was one of the first Western journalists allowed to enter and report on the handing over and trial of the deposed President of Iraq Saddam Hussein by the Iraqi Interim Government for crimes against humanity. Mohyeldin has also covered the 2008–2009 Gaza War as well as the Arab Spring.

== Early life ==
Mohyeldin was born in Cairo, Egypt, to an Egyptian father, Medhat Mohyeldin, and a Palestinian mother, Abla Awwad. His father is a certified public accountant in Marietta, Georgia. Mohyeldin has an older brother, Ahmed, who is a resident neurosurgeon at the Ohio State University Wexner Medical Center and former professional soccer star for the Atlanta Silverbacks. Mohyeldin lived in Egypt until the age of 5 when his parents emigrated to the U.S. He attended North Cobb High School in Kennesaw, Georgia.

Mohyeldin received his undergraduate education at American University in Washington, D.C., earning a BA in international relations with a focus on the European Union. He received an MA in international politics with a focus on Peace and Conflict Resolution. His graduate thesis was entitled "The News Media Paradigm in the War on Terrorism," and, in 2002, it was accepted by the International Association of Media Researchers Conference in Barcelona, Spain. He lived in Iraq from 2003 to 2005 as a foreign news producer with CNN.

== Career ==
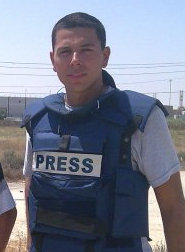
Mohyeldin in Gaza

Mohyeldin began his career in journalism working at NBC, as a desk assistant for the Washington D.C. bureau. Mohyeldin's first major assignments happened shortly after 9/11. In an interview with PRWeek, he explained that in the aftermath of 9/11 his "language skills and expertise in the Middle East" opened professional doors for him.

As a producer, Mohyeldin became the first journalist to enter one of Libya's nuclear research facilities after producing Col. Muammar al-Gaddafi's first interview announcing Libya would abandon all WMD programs. Mohyeldin's work in the CNN documentary "Iraq:progress report" about the daily struggles of Iraqis during the war was nominated for an Emmy Award. He served as an associate producer for the NBC News Special that also received Emmy nominations for "Ship at War: Inside the Carrier Stennis" and "Inside the Real West Wing." Mohyeldin has also covered the annual Muslim Pilgrimage (Hajj) to Mecca and was involved in the production of CNN specials "Islam: The Struggle Within" and "Hajj: A Spiritual Journey."

In 2008–2009, Mohyeldin covered the Israeli attack on the Gaza Strip. The coverage of his reporting, along with Sherine Tadros has been released in the documentary " The War Around Us".

In 2011, Mohyeldin left Al Jazeera English and returned to NBC where he extensively covered the second "Arab Uprising" in Egypt in 2013. He also covered the unrest in Ukraine, and most recently the unrest in Iraq.

=== 2011 Egyptian revolution ===
Mohyeldin covered the 2011 Egyptian Revolution for Al Jazeera English. On January 28, 2011, he broadcast from the Al Jazeera news building in Cairo for several hours straight, reporting on the Egyptian protests as protesters and Egyptian police battled for control of the 6th October Bridge. On January 30, Anis El Fekki of the Egyptian Interior Ministry revoked Al Jazeera's broadcast license and forced the closure of their Cairo bureau, claiming the network was conspiring with opposition groups to overthrow the government. He was one of five Al Jazeera journalists arrested and briefly detained by Egyptian authorities the following day, after the network refused to cease broadcasting upon the loss of their accreditation.

On February 6, 2011, Mohyeldin was again arrested by the Egyptian military upon trying to enter Tahrir square. He was released nine hours later.

On September 20, 2011, Mohyeldin rejoined NBC News, where his career began.

In January 2012, Mohyeldin traveled to Syria to cover the months-old uprising. Among the cities he visited was Daraa.

In the summer of 2013 Mohyeldin extensively covered the removal of President Mohamed Morsi from power In Egypt. That fall he also extensively covered the Syrian civil war and the effects of refugees overflowing into neighboring Lebanon. Mohyeldin also covered the agreement of Syria to dispose of their chemical weapons program.

During the uprisings in Ukraine in 2014, Mohyeldin covered extensively in both Kyiv and Donetsk. He traveled to the border in Eastern Ukraine and reported on Russian troop buildup, and the Ukrainian response. He also went "behind the scenes" into the occupied government buildings to report.

=== Israel–Gaza conflict ===
Mohyeldin was sent by NBC as a correspondent to Gaza at the beginning of the one month-long 2014 conflict. His coverage was praised by media critics such as Glenn Greenwald for departing from "the standard pro-Israel coverage that dominates establishment American press coverage".

Two weeks into the conflict, on July 16, 2014, Mohyeldin witnessed and reported via a series of tweets, the death of 4 Palestinian children who were playing soccer and hide-and-seek on a Gaza beach. The first missile killed one child and the second killed the other 3. The killings were witnessed by many in the international press. Just moments earlier, Mohyeldin was kicking a soccer ball with these boys in front of his hotel. The Israeli government claimed that the beach was shelled in response to Hamas rocket fire allegedly originating from that area, though journalists who attended the scene said the beach was empty but for a fisherman's hut and a few tools.

Although Mohyeldin was a live witness to the event, NBC correspondent Richard Engel reported the story from Tel Aviv. NBC followed by pulling Mohyeldin from Gaza and terminating his reporting duties from Gaza indefinitely. Engel was sent to replace him in Gaza. NBC was subsequently criticized by independent media outlets for removing Mohyeldin, with many believing he was singled out for portraying Palestinians with empathy and social media trends accusing NBC of pro-Israel bias.

Mohyeldin returned to Gaza on July 18, 2014, after NBC received heavy criticism for pulling him out of Gaza. On Sunday, August 3, 2014, he announced via social media that after 4 weeks on the road he was "taking time to be with family." Less than 48 hours later, Israel and Hamas agreed to a cease fire.

At the beginning of the Gaza war, Semafor reported that a number of Muslim hosts (including Mehdi Hasan, Mohyeldin, and Ali Velshi) were sidelined from coverage by MSNBC. Mohyeldin has continued to report on the conflict since.

=== MSNBC shows ===
Mohyeldin has hosted a number of shows on MSNBC since joining NBC News in 2011, including Morning Joe First Look, an early-morning pre-show for MSNBC's flagship morning show Morning Joe, and Ayman Mohyeldin Reports (originally MSNBC Live with Ayman Mohyeldin), a weekday afternoon show. In September 2021, his program Ayman took over the weekend evening spot formerly held by Joshua Johnson's The Week with Joshua Johnson, and it also streams on Peacock on Fridays, while Hallie Jackson took over his weekday afternoon slot. The last episode of Ayman aired in late April 2025, after which Mohyeldin joined new MSNBC panel show The Weekend: Primetime. He is also a fill in guest host on MSNBC's All In with Chris Hayes, Deadline: White House, The Beat with Ari Melber, The Rachel Maddow Show, Alex Wagner Tonight, and The Last Word with Lawrence O'Donnell.

Shortly after the January 6 United States Capitol attack, Mohyeldin received a call from a high school classmate in Kennesaw, Georgia, whose sister-in-law Rosanne Boyland died in the attack. Investigating how Boyland died and how "a previously apolitical 34-year-old homebody [was] so quickly radicalized in the summer of 2020" led to a five-part podcast entitled American Radical that premiered in December 2021.

== Personal life ==
Mohyeldin married Tunisian model Kenza Fourati on April 26, 2016, in a private ceremony in Marietta, Georgia. They have two children.

== External materials ==
- Twitter page of Ayman Mohyeldin
- Appearances on C-SPAN
- Ayman on MSNBC
