= Eugene Daniels =

American journalist (born 1989)

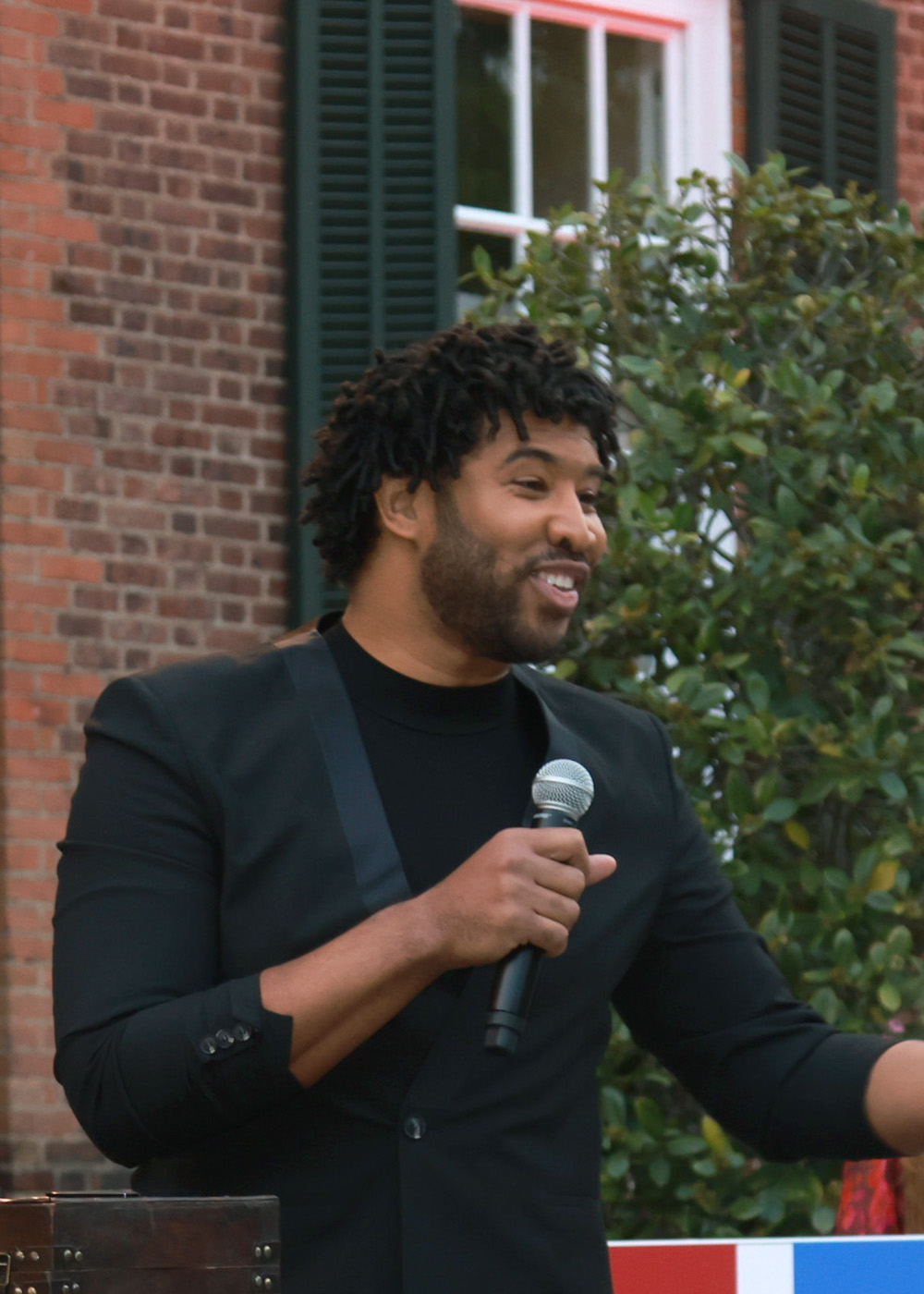
- Daniels in 2023
- Born: Eugene Anthony Daniels II; February 12, 1989 (age 37); New York City, New York, U.S.
- Education: Colorado State University (BA)
- Occupation: Journalist
- Employer: MS NOW
- Spouse: Nathan Thomas Stephens (m. 2022)

Eugene Anthony Daniels-Stephens II (born February 12, 1989) is an American journalist. He is the senior Washington correspondent for MS NOW and co-host of The Weekend.

Formerly a writer for Politico, Daniels joined MSNBC in 2025 after having been an on-air contributor since 2021. He served as president of the White House Correspondents' Association.

== Early life and education ==
Daniels was born in Manhattan, New York, on February 12, 1989. Less than a year later his family moved to Fort Hood, Texas. Daniels' father was a lieutenant colonel in the U.S. Army and was deployed several times to Iraq following the 9/11 attacks and the U.S. invasion of Iraq. He attended Shoemaker High School in Killeen, Texas where he played football. On December 12, 2006, Daniels committed to play NCAA Division I football at Colorado State University. He signed a letter of intent on February 7, 2007.

Daniels was a defensive lineman at Colorado State, where off the field he majored in political science, later switching to journalism. He was a redshirt freshman for the 2007-08 season. On August 20, 2009, Daniels was taken to the hospital following heat-related health issues during a team practice. In 2010, just before his junior season, Daniels injured his shoulder. He continued as a part of the team but stopped playing due to his shoulder injury. He began to focus more on his journalism career. At the 2011 NCAA Convention in San Antonio, Texas, Daniels successfully ran for vice-chair of the Division I National Student-Athlete Advisory Committee. He graduated from Colorado State University in 2012.

== Career ==
Daniels joined Politico in 2018, covering the 2018 midterm elections. During the 2020 presidential election, Daniels covered the Andrew Yang campaign. Following this, he became a White House correspondent for Politico. From 2021 to 2025, during the Biden/Harris administration, he covered Vice President Kamala Harris, First Lady Jill Biden, and Second Gentleman Doug Emhoff. Daniels is also a co-author of Politico's Playbook, a daily early-morning email newsletter. He is the first Black and first openly LGBTQ author of the newsletter.

Daniels became an MSNBC contributor.in March 2021. In April 2022, he was promoted to senior contributor on Morning Joe.

In July 2022, Daniels was elected treasurer of the White House Correspondents' Association (WHCA) for 2024–25. Kaitlan Collins of CNN was elected president but resigned in September due to her promotion as co-anchor on CNN This Morning. According to WHCA bylaws, in the event that the president-elect is unable to serve, the person elected treasurer becomes president. As such, Daniels was designated president of the WHCA for 2024–25. He accepted the call to serve by saying, "I am both humbled and full of excitement to serve and for all that we will do together."

In March 2025, Daniels announced that he would leave Politico and join MSNBC full-time. He now serves as a senior Washington correspondent, and as one of the three co-hosts of The Weekend, where he made history alongside Jonathan Capehart as the first two openly gay Black men to co-host a national American television program .

== Personal life ==
Daniels came out as gay in 2016. He married Nathan Thomas Stephens on October 29, 2022, at the Evergreen Museum & Library in Baltimore, Maryland.
