= Elise Jordan =

American TV journalist

- Born: September 23, 1983 (age 42); Holly Springs, Mississippi
- Education: Yale University (BA)
- Employer(s): NBC News, MSNBC, MS NOW
- Spouses: Michael Hastings (m. 2011; died 2013) Mike Hogan (m. 2017)
- Children: 1
- Relatives: Russell Jordan (brother)

Elise Jordan is an American journalist, writer, and media personality working as the co-host of MS NOW's (formerly MSNBC's) The Weekend Primetime until June 2026 and a political analyst on NBC and MS NOW. She is also a columnist contributing to Time.

== Early life and education ==
Jordan was born and raised in Holly Springs, Mississippi to parents Susan Boone Jordan and Kelly Jordan. She has a brother, Russell Jordan. After attending a local high school in her hometown, she attended Yale University in New Haven, Connecticut. Jordan graduated from the institute in 2004 with a Bachelor of Arts degree in history.

== Career ==
Jordan began her career as a reporter after graduating from college, working for Condoleezza Rice (who was the 66th US Secretary of State). After that, she went to work at the US National Security Council, becoming director of communications and a presidential speechwriter.

She also served as a policy advisor to Senator Rand Paul's 2016 presidential campaign before joining NBC News and MSNBC as a political analyst and commentator in 2016, appearing on MSNBC's Morning Joe, gaining wider recognition for her analysis on the top news stories that make the headlines.

From November 2025 to June 2026, she was a co-host on MS NOW’s (formerly MSNBC) The Weekend Primetime with Ayman Mohyeldin, Catherine Rampell, and Antonia Hylton.

== Personal life ==
Jordan was married to journalist and author Michael Hastings from 2011 to 2013 until he died in a car crash in 2013. In 2017, she married digital director Mike Hogan, and the couple welcomed their firstborn daughter in 2020.
