= Antonia Hylton =

American journalist

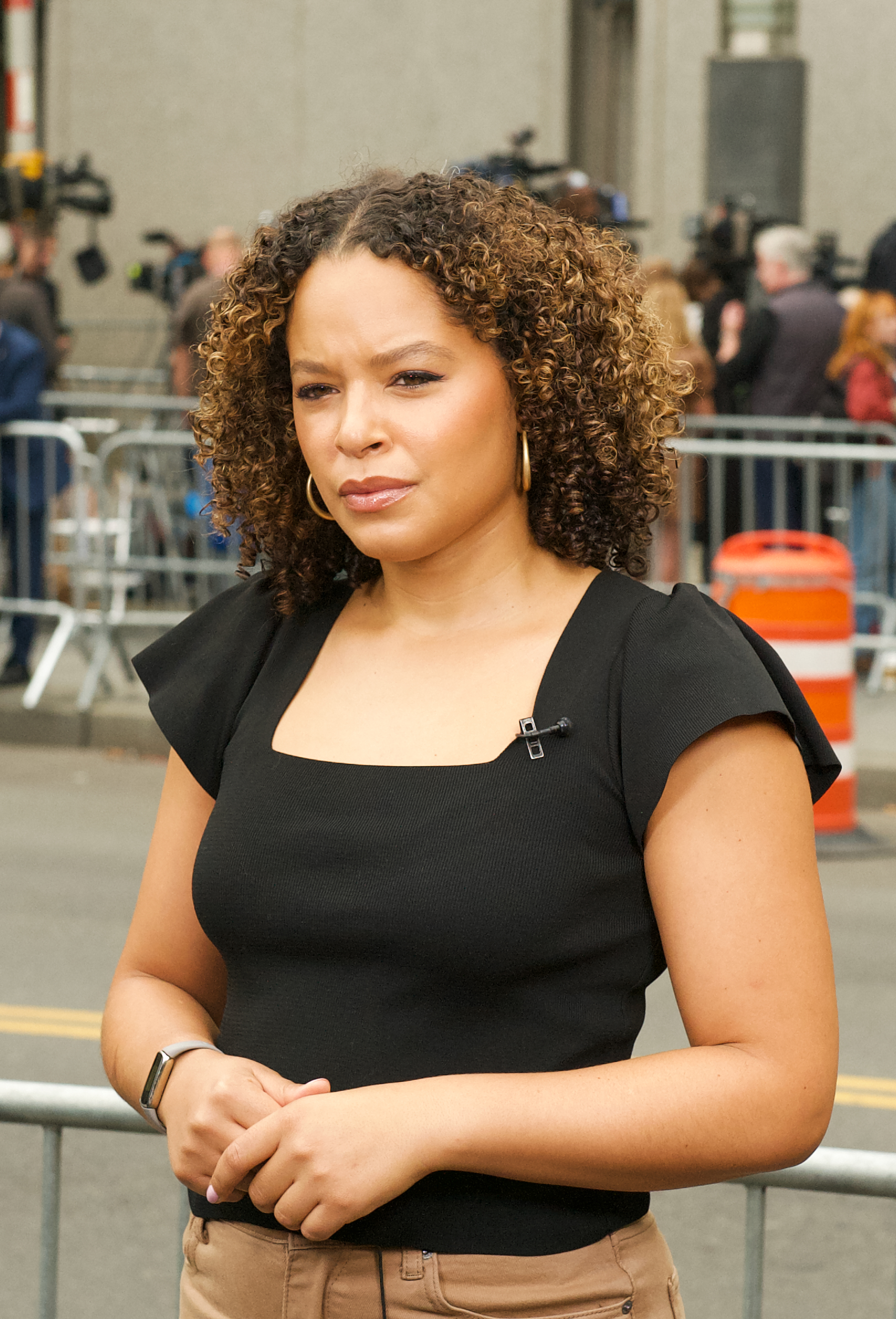
- Hylton reporting on the federal prosecution of Eric Adams in 2024
- Born: September 26, 1993 (age 33)
- Citizenship: American
- Education: Harvard University (BA)
- Occupation: Journalist
- Relatives: Soledad O'Brien (aunt)
- Awards: News and Documentary Emmy Award (2019 & 2022); Forbes 30 Under 30 (2020); Peabody Award (2022; for Southlake podcast)
- Website: www.antoniahylton.com

Antonia Hylton (born September 26, 1993) is an American journalist. She has been the anchor of The Assignment with Antonia Hylton on MS NOW since September 2026. She was previously a correspondent for NBC News and a co-anchor of MS NOW's The Weekend: Primetime. She won two Emmy Awards, a Peabody Award, and was a finalist for the Pulitzer Prize for Audio Reporting.

== Early life ==
Hylton was raised outside Boston, one of seven children. Both of her parents are lawyers. Her aunt is journalist Soledad O'Brien. She was an avid reader growing up, and also performed in choir, musical theater, and was a member of dance groups. In 2015 she graduated magna cum laude from Harvard University, where she majored in history and science and global health.

== Career ==
Hylton was hired directly after graduation by Mic.com as a producer and writer for their news shows Flip the Script and Future Present. Hylton met activist Darnell Moore working at Mic. Together they developed the docuseries The Movement with Darnell Moore, about grassroots organizing around the United States. The next year, Hylton joined Vice News Tonight as a correspondent and producer covering civil rights and politics. She reported on topics including gang violence and immigration.

Hylton was a correspondent for the news show The Report on Quibi until the platform shut down. She next became a reporter for NBC News. In 2021 she became the co-reporter for NBC's Southlake, a podcast about how a group of white students' use of a racial epithet began a cascade of controversy around critical race theory in the suburb of Southlake, Texas. The podcast received accolades including a Peabody Award, a Scripps Howard Award, and it was named a finalist for the Pulitzer Prize for Audio Reporting. In 2022 she won a News and Documentary Emmy Award for Outstanding Emerging Journalist.

Hylton has spoken on bias she has experienced as a Black woman reporter. She has also discussed the importance of authenticity in her reporting work. She has served as a judge for the American Mosaic Journalism Prize every year since 2019.

In 2024, Hylton published her debut book, Madness: Race and Insanity in a Jim Crow Asylum, about Crownsville Hospital. The book was a New York Times best seller.

In 2025, it was announced Hylton would depart NBC News to co-host The Weekend: Primetime alongside Ayman Mohyeldin, Catherine Rampell and Elise Jordan, which debuted in May 2025 on MSNBC.

In 2026, MS NOW announced that it had canceled The Weekend: Primetime, and Hylton would succeed the departing Alex Witt as the new anchor for the 1 p.m. hour later in the year. Hylton took over MS NOW's news-focused weekend afternoons when she launched The Assignment on September 12, 2026.

== Personal life ==
Hylton was diagnosed with a rare neuroendocrine tumor on her colon when she was 30. She had the tumor removed and the cancer did not spread.

== Accolades ==
- 2019 – News and Documentary Emmy Award, Outstanding Feature Story in a Newscast (for Vice News Tonight: Zero Tolerance)
- 2020 – Forbes, 30 under 30
- 2022 – Finalist, Pulitzer Prize for Audio Reporting (for Southlake)
- 2022 – 69th Scripps Howard Award for Excellence in Radio/Podcast Coverage (for Southlake)
- 2022 – Peabody Award for Podcast/Radio (for Southlake)
- 2022 – News and Documentary Emmy Award for Outstanding Emerging Journalist
