= Morning Joe =

American television news program

- Genre: Talk show
- Presented by: Joe Scarborough; Mika Brzezinski; Willie Geist; Jonathan Lemire
- Country of origin: United States
- Original language: English

Production
- Executive producers: Alex Korson; Dan Norwick; Mike Buczkiewicz
- Producer: Mike Buczkiewicz (senior producer)
- Production locations: Secaucus, New Jersey (April 9 – October 19, 2007); New York City (October 22, 2007 – present); Jupiter, Florida (2019 – present)
- Running time: 180 minutes

Original release
- Network: MSNBC
- Release: April 9, 2007 – November 14, 2025
- Network: MS NOW
- Release: November 17, 2025 – present

Related
- Scarborough Country; Morning Joe First Look

Morning Joe is an American morning news talk show, which airs weekdays from 6:00 a.m. to 9:00 a.m. Eastern Time on the cable news channel MS NOW. It features former US Representative Joe Scarborough reporting and discussing the news of the day in a panel format with co-hosts Mika Brzezinski (whom Scarborough married in November 2018), Willie Geist, who regularly co-hosts from Tuesdays to Fridays, and Jonathan Lemire, along with recurring and special guests.

== History ==
Morning Joe began as a fill-in program after Don Imus' Imus in the Morning was canceled in April 2007. Former Florida Republican Congressman Joe Scarborough, then host of the primetime MSNBC program Scarborough Country, suggested the idea of doing a morning show instead. He put together what would become Morning Joe with Scarborough Country executive producer Chris Licht and screenwriter John Ridley. The pun in the show's title is echoed by a coffee ring in its logo. On April 16, 2007 (Imus' show aired until April 11, 2007, on MSNBC), the show debuted as one of a series of rotating programs auditioning for Imus's former slot, with Scarborough joined by co-hosts Mika Brzezinski and Ridley. Scarborough had personally asked Brzezinski to co-host with him the night before the first audition, while she was a "cut-in" presenter during MSNBC's primetime schedule on a freelance basis.

Ridley quickly dropped out as main co-host but continued as a regular guest, while Willie Geist was tapped as co-host. The program permanently took over the slot in July 2007, though the decision was not officially announced until October that year.

During the first quarter of 2009, Morning Joe earned higher ratings in the age 25-54 demo category than CNN's competing program, American Morning, but had fewer viewers overall. Both programs finished behind Fox News's Fox & Friends during the same time period.

By March 2010, the show's ratings remained behind those of Fox & Friends, but surpassed its other cable competitors American Morning, Morning Express with Robin Meade, and Squawk Box. Morning Joe continued to regularly place second in total viewers and younger demographic to Fox & Friends, ahead of other cable news competitors including CNN's New Day. However, Morning Joe ranked behind CNN's counterpart programming during short stints in 2013.

Over the years, the program's focus has shifted partly toward enterprise journalism: Scarborough and Brzezinski provide exclusives from the United States Congress, the US State Department, and the White House.

On May 4, 2017, an MSNBC spokesperson confirmed that Scarborough and Brzezinski were engaged to be married. Their style in running the show was then parodied by Saturday Night Live with Kate McKinnon and Alex Moffat.

In May 2017, for the first time in the program's history, Morning Joe attracted an average of over 1 million daily total viewers for the month.

In February 2022, MSNBC announced that the show would be extended with a fourth, 9 a.m. hour beginning April 4. The extension replaced Stephanie Ruhle Reports, after Stephanie Ruhle moved to MSNBC's late-night program The 11th Hour to succeed Brian Williams.

On July 15, 2024, Morning Joe was preempted and replaced by Morning News Now from NBC News Now in order to provide extended coverage of the attempted assassination of then-presidential candidate Donald Trump. CNN reported that the preemption was due to concerns from network staff over the possibility that a panelist or guest could make insensitive comments regarding the shooting. The show returned to air on July 16.

In December 2024, it was announced that Way Too Early host Jonathan Lemire would move to the 9 a.m. hour of Morning Joe as a panelist in January 2025, with Ali Vitali succeeding him as host of Way Too Early.

On March 18, 2026, it was announced that starting in June, the show would go back to three hours instead of four, with Lemire moving to co-host the 8 a.m. hour.

On November 16, 2026, Geist announced that he will be departing the show at the end of the year, and will focus more on Sunday Today and expand his role at Today.

== Spinoffs ==
=== WABC radio edition ===
A radio version debuted in December 2008, carried on WABC in New York City (which was also carrying Imus in the Morning at the time) and other Citadel Media owned and operated stations. Scarborough and Brzezinski hosted this version, called The Joe Scarborough Show, which also replayed highlights from that day's "Morning Joe" television show. Scarborough attested that, at least on WABC, the show beat the Glenn Beck Program in the New York City radio market's Arbitron ratings. Despite acceptable ratings, however, the radio version was put on hiatus in April 2010. Scarborough voiced an intention to bring back the show in a revised three-hour version at an undisclosed time in the future.

=== Way Too Early ===
On July 27, 2009, Willie Geist began hosting a new 30-minute show, Way Too Early. It aired on MSNBC at 5:30 a.m. Eastern Time as a lead-in to Morning Joe. Geist left the program in October 2012 when he began co-hosting the third hour of NBC's Today. He is currently a co-host of Morning Joe. The program was revived in September 2020 with Kasie Hunt who left 10 months later for CNN. From October 2021 to December 2024, the program was hosted by Jonathan Lemire, until he moved to Morning Joe's 9 a.m. hour. Since January 6, 2025, the program has been hosted by Ali Vitali.

=== Morning Joe First Look ===
On August 8, 2016, the existing early morning program First Look airing at 5:00 a.m. was expanded into the former timeslot of Way Too Early and retitled Morning Joe First Look, retaining segments from the latter program and presumably to feature some continuity with Morning Joe itself.

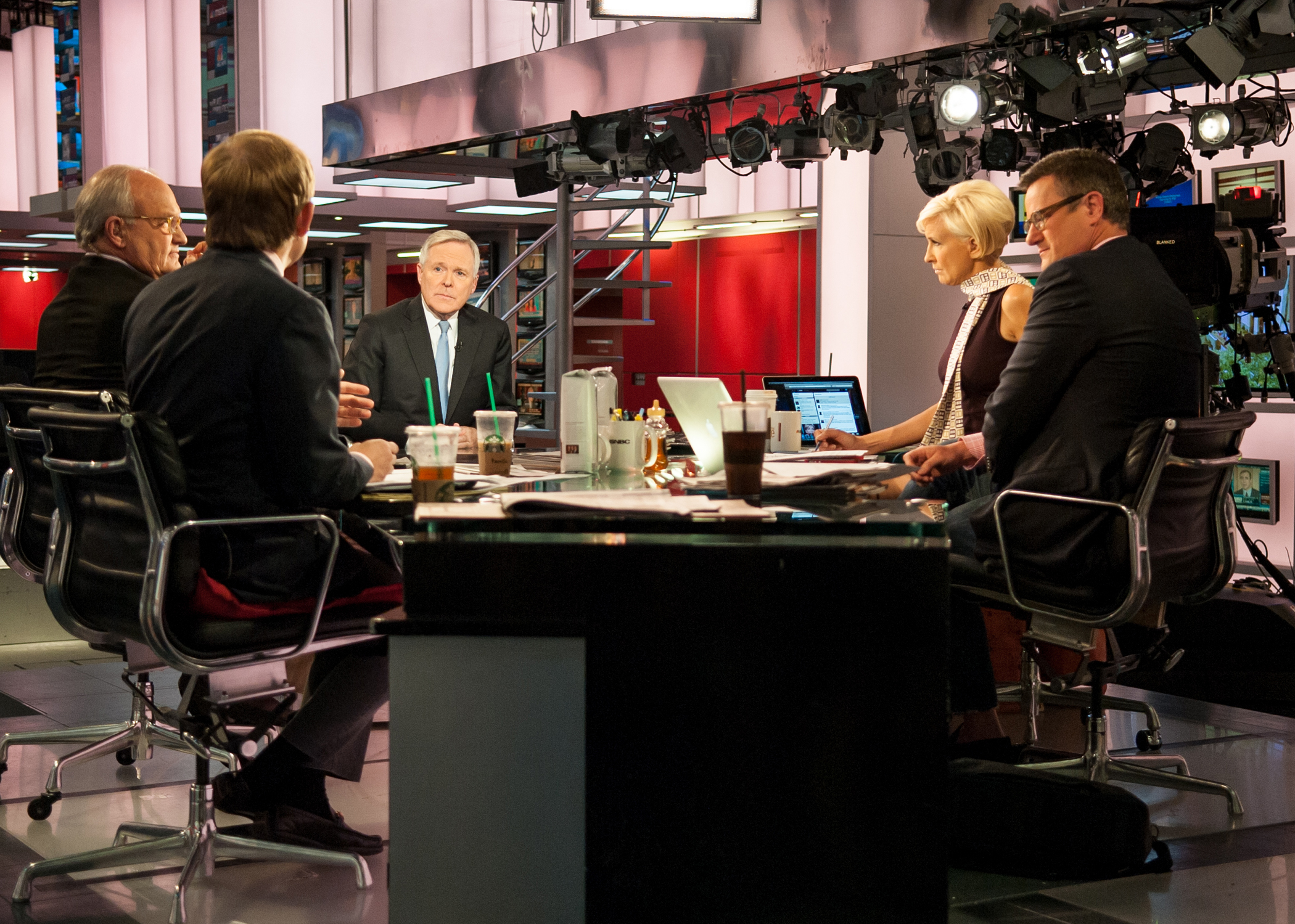
Morning Joe broadcasts from 30 Rockefeller Center in New York City.

=== Morning Joe: Weekend ===
On February 11, 2023, MSNBC began to regularly air Morning Joe: Weekend, a recap of the show's most notable moments from the week's broadcasts. The shows has been broadcast every Saturday morning from 6:00 a.m. to 8:00 a.m. U.S. Eastern Time. The show was later expanded to both Saturdays and Sundays.

=== Joe Scarborough Presents ===
On April 17, 2023, MSNBC announced that Joe Scarborough would host a primetime special titled Joe Scarborough Presents on April 24, 2023, temporarily taking over the 8 p.m. hour of All In with Chris Hayes, where Scarborough interviewed U.S. president Joe Biden, former U.S. president Bill Clinton, former British prime minister Tony Blair, and former U.S. secretary of state Hillary Clinton.

On May 8, 2023, Scarborough hosted another primetime special. He interviewed U.S. senator John Fetterman, Shonda Rhimes and Tyler Perry.

On July 17, 2023, Scarborough hosted a third special, interviewing Christopher Nolan, Cillian Murphy, Emily Blunt, Matt Damon, and Robert Downey Jr.

== Regular guests and contributors ==
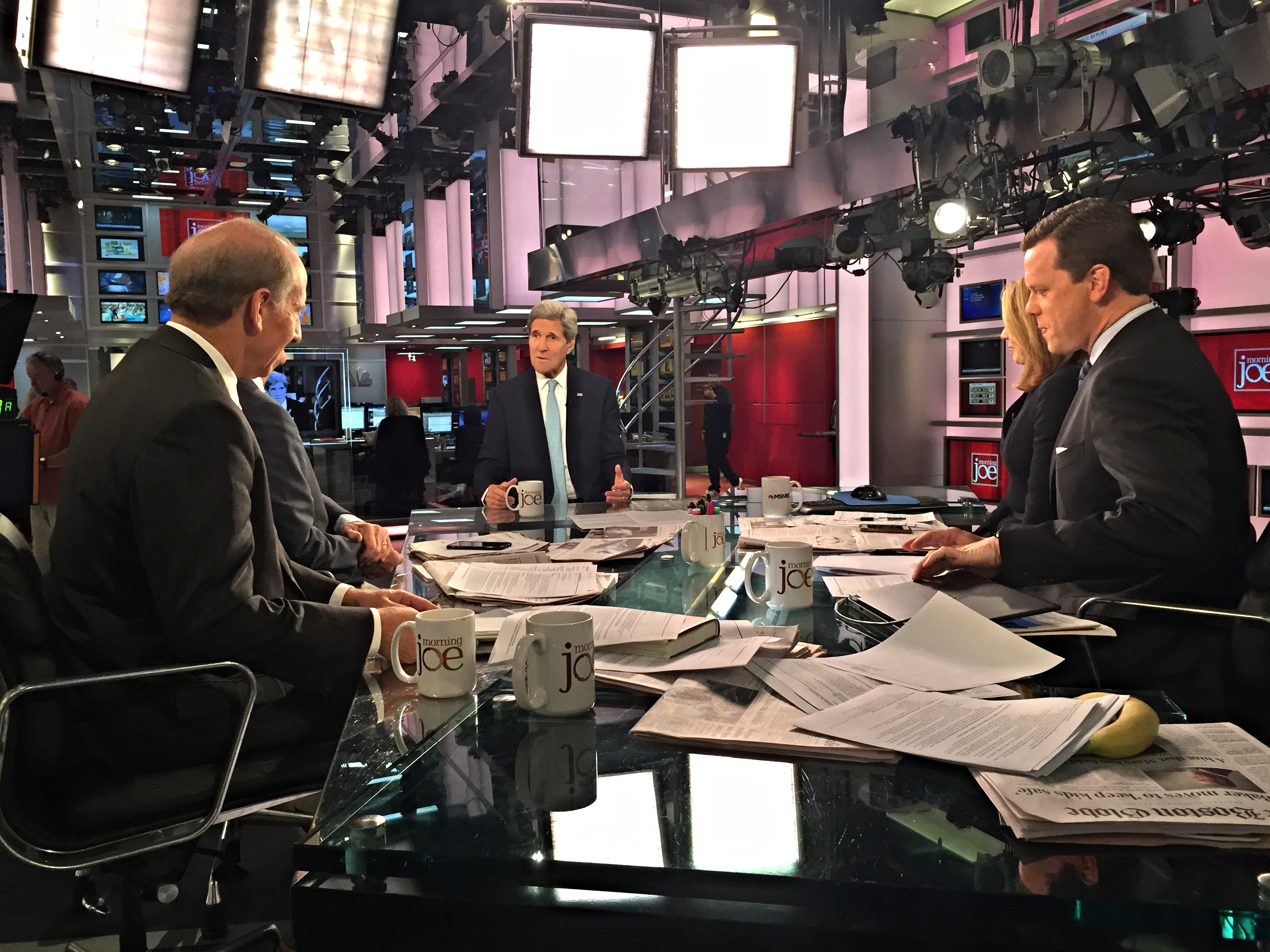
U.S. Secretary of State John Kerry talks with Nicolle Wallace, Mike Barnicle, Mark Halperin, Richard Haass, and Katty Kay during an appearance on September 29, 2015.

Regular guests and contributors include:

- Mike Barnicle, freelance columnist.
- David Rohde MS NOW National Security Affairs Editor
- Tina Brown, publisher of The Daily Beast.
- David Campbell, in-house doctor.
- Donny Deutsch, CEO of the advertising/marketing firm Deutsch, Inc. and CNBC/MS NOW contributor.
- Mara Gay, journalist and member of The New York Times editorial board.
- Eddie Glaude, former chair of the Center for African-American Studies and the William S. Tod Professor of Religion and African-American Studies at Princeton University.
- Richard N. Haass, former president of the Council on Foreign Relations.
- John Heilemann, MS NOW political analyst, co-managing editor of Bloomberg Politics, and co-author of the presidential-campaign histories Game Change and Double Down.
- David Ignatius, Washington Post journalist.
- Elise Jordan, MSNBC political analyst and host of MSNBC's The Weekend: Primetime.
- Katty Kay, former anchor of BBC World News America.
- Ari Melber, chief legal correspondent, and host of MS NOW's The Beat with Ari Melber.
- Jon Meacham, Pulitzer Prize-winning historian, co-host of PBS television news magazine Need to Know, and former editor of Newsweek.
- Jen Psaki, former White House Press Secretary and host of MS NOW's The Briefing with Jen Psaki.
- Steve Rattner, Morning Joe economic analyst.
- Eugene Robinson, Washington Post editorial columnist.
- Rev. Al Sharpton, host of MS NOW's PoliticsNation.
- Jake Sherman, journalist, writer, co-founder of Punchbowl News.
- Sam Stein, Huffington Post correspondent.
- James Stavridis, retired United States Navy admiral and NATO Supreme Allied Commander Europe.
- Michael Steele, former chairman of the Republican National Committee, co-host of MS NOW's The Weeknight.
- Nicolle Wallace, MS NOW political analyst/anchor, host of MS NOW's Deadline: White House and former White House Communications Director for George W. Bush.

== Past contributors and segments ==
- Peter Baker, New York Times columnist.
- Louis Burgdorf, former Morning Joe correspondent and producer
- Zbigniew Brzezinski, former National Security Advisor to Jimmy Carter and the father of co-host Mika Brzezinski
- Pat Buchanan, past co-host of CNN's Crossfire and MSNBC's Buchanan and Press. A former presidential candidate and an on-air personality beginning in 2002, Buchanan was suspended by MSNBC in October 2011, following the publication of his book Suicide of a Superpower due to alleged racist slurs, specifically in its chapter titled "The End of White America". Four months later, MSNBC severed its relationship with Buchanan.
- Tom Brokaw, NBC News special correspondent and former NBC Nightly News anchor
- Erin Burnett, CNN and past CNBC anchor. In her role as anchor on CNBC's Squawk on the Street, Burnett regularly contributed as the correspondent during the daily 8:30am "Business Before the Bell" segment. She left CNBC for an anchor position at CNN in May 2011. Scarborough habitually introduced Burnett with the nickname "International Superstar".
- Jonathan Capehart, Washington Post editorial page writer and host of MS NOW's The Saturday Show and The Sunday Show.
- Tucker Carlson, political commentator. Carlson left MSNBC to work as a commentator for the Fox News Channel in May 2009.
- Robert Costa national political reporter for The Washington Post
- Jim Cramer, host of CNBC's Mad Money
- Harold Ford Jr., former Democratic Leadership Council chairman, former Congressman from Tennessee and visiting professor at New York University.
- Nancy Gibbs, managing editor of Time. Gibbs revealed the cover of the coming week's magazine every Thursday.
- Robert Gibbs, MS NOW political analyst and former White House Press Secretary for Barack Obama.
- Mark Haines, the late co-anchor of CNBC's Squawk on the Street. Haines filled in for his co-anchor Erin Burnett on several occasions for the "Business Before the Bell" segment. He briefly took it over after her departure from CNBC until his death on May 24, 2011.
- Mark Halperin, former MS NOW senior political analyst, former co-managing editor of Bloomberg Politics, and co-author of the presidential-campaign histories Game Change and Double Down.
- Courtney Hazlett, supervising entertainment editor for NBC News' digital properties, NBCNews.com and TODAY.com.
- Kasie Hunt, American political correspondent for CNN and host of The Arena with Kasie Hunt.
- Julia Ioffe, Atlantic journalist.
- Bill Karins, NBC News meteorologist.
- Nicole Lapin, CNN and past guest anchor on CNBC's Worldwide Exchange.
- Chris Matthews, host of MS NOW's Hardball with Chris Matthews.
- Jackie Meretsky, NBC Weather Plus meteorologist. NBC shut down NBC Weather Plus in December 2008, thus eliminating her position. She was on maternity leave at the time. Meretsky joined Good Morning America as a meteorologist in 2011.
- Mike Murphy, political analyst and Republican party strategist.
- Peggy Noonan, op-ed columnist for the Wall Street Journal.
- Lawrence O'Donnell, host of MS NOW's The Last Word and Emmy-winning writer and producer for the TV series The West Wing.
- Norah O'Donnell, senior correspondent for CBS News and a contributing correspondent for 60 Minutes.
- Heidi Przybyla, former MSNBC senior political correspondent.
- John Ridley, screenwriter and Huffington Post contributor.
- Fred Roggin, KNBC-TV sports anchor. Between 2007 and 2010, Roggin contributed a taped sports scores and highlight recap for "The Sideline" and "Morning Sports Shot" segments during the 6:00am hour. Co-host Willie Geist gradually took over the segment in 2010.
- Noah Rothman, Associate Editor of Commentary magazine.
- Tim Russert, the late host of NBC's Meet the Press.
- Jeffrey Sachs, economist and Director of The Earth Institute at Columbia University.
- Sam Tanenhaus, senior editor of The New York Times Book Review. Between April 2009 and March 2010, Tanenhaus would appear on either the Thursday or Friday show to preview The New York Times Book Review's forthcoming issue.
- Chuck Todd, former NBC News host of Meet the Press and Meet the Press Now on NBC News NOW.

=== Chris Matthews "messed around" comments ===
On January 9, 2008, the morning after Hillary Clinton's surprise victory in the New Hampshire Democratic presidential primary, Matthews appeared on the show and said of Clinton, "I'll be brutal. The reason she's a U.S. senator, the reason she's a candidate for president, the reason she may be a front-runner is her husband messed around. That's how she got to be senator from New York. We keep forgetting it. She didn't win there on her merit." The comments, widely reacted to as sexist and unfair, were criticized by such diverse media figures as Bill O'Reilly, Joy Behar, and Gloria Steinem. They also led to protests outside NBC's Washington, D.C. studios, as well as a joint letter of complaint to NBC from the National Organization for Women, Feminist Majority, and the National Women's Political Caucus. Matthews apologized for the comments on the January 17, 2008, edition of his program, Hardball with Chris Matthews.

=== Institution of a seven-second delay ===
On November 10, 2008, Scarborough read the word "fuck" on air while reading from a story about then-President-elect Obama's incoming Chief of Staff, Rahm Emanuel. Once he realized his mistake, Scarborough repeatedly apologized for his slip of the tongue, and explained that he had meant to say "the F word" instead. The next day, the network instituted a seven-second delay for Morning Joe.

In another incident on June 29, 2011, then Time editor-at-large Mark Halperin commented that the president came off as "kind of a dick" during the previous day's press conference. The word aired uncensored, despite the seven-second delay, when a producer failed to press the button that would have "bleeped" it. Halperin issued an on-air apology immediately following a commercial break. The White House subsequently complained about Halperin's remarks, and on June 30, 2011, Halperin was temporarily suspended for "slurring" the president. He returned as a guest a couple of weeks later.

=== "Stunningly superficial" ===
On December 30, 2008, Brzezinski's father and former National Security Advisor to President Jimmy Carter, Zbigniew Brzezinski appeared as a guest to discuss the unfolding Israel–Palestine crisis. Scarborough stated that Yasser Arafat was offered everything he wanted at the 2000 Camp David Summit. This statement provoked Zbigniew to reply, "You know, you have such a stunningly superficial knowledge of what went on that it's almost embarrassing to listen to you." Subsequently, the phrase "stunningly superficial" has become something of a running gag on the show.

=== Sponsorship ===
Beginning on June 1, 2009, Morning Joe was presented as "Brewed by Starbucks", with the sponsor's logo incorporated into the show's logo. Although the hosts previously consumed Starbucks coffee on air "for free", in the words of the network's president Phil Griffin, it was not paid placement at that time. The Starbucks sponsorship of Morning Joe ended in 2013.

=== Feud with Jon Stewart ===
On June 3, 2009, The Daily Show host Jon Stewart mocked the Starbucks sponsorship of the program, showing several clips of the Morning Joe cast prominently displaying and complimenting Starbucks products as well as an interview with Starbucks CEO Howard Schultz. Scarborough responded that his intent in discussing the sponsorship was sarcastic and he suggested that Stewart and his "90 writers" did not understand the joke. On June 8, Stewart feigned embarrassment over missing their alleged sarcasm, claiming, "At the time, I thought your jokey manner was just a way of sublimating your shame over the discomfort you feel deep in your soul after extinguishing the last smoldering embers of any of your program's journalistic bona fides. But now, I realize that that wasn't the case!" On June 9, Scarborough fired back, referring to Stewart as "a very, very angry guy with a Napoleonic complex". The next day, Stewart and correspondent John Oliver again responded with a skit, involving Stewart impersonating Napoleon and Oliver impersonating an even shorter Arthur Wellesley, Duke of Wellington. After the routine, Stewart joked that he hoped that this would be the end of the feud, since continuing it was becoming expensive for the show.

=== Clash with Rush Limbaugh ===
During the Obama administration, Joe Scarborough sought to distance himself from certain elements in the Republican Party. He criticized Republicans such as Rush Limbaugh who celebrated President Obama's failed bid to bring the 2016 Olympics to Chicago saying that "Republicans have gone off the deep end." On the October 8, 2009 edition of his radio show, Limbaugh fired back by saying that Scarborough was "doing his best impression of [...] a neutered chickified moderate". Scarborough responded the next day on Morning Joe, faulting Limbaugh for uncritical loyalty to George W. Bush during the president's tenure in office. Scarborough specifically said that Limbaugh had put his "testicles in a blind trust for George W. Bush for eight years".

=== Russell Brand interview ===
The Morning Joe interview with actor and comedian Russell Brand, a segment in the episode that aired on June 17, 2013, went viral on the Internet. He was there to promote his forthcoming stand-up comedy tour "The Messiah Complex". After the three interviewers (host Mika Brzezinski and contributors Katty Kay and Brian Shactman) repeatedly intercut the interview with personal observations of their guest—bantering among themselves whether they were able to understand his accent, referring to him in the third person, and calling him "Willy"—Brand protested at being talked about "as if he wasn't present and [as if he was] an extraterrestrial" before taking the interview over with a scathing commentary on what he perceived as a lack of professionalism and manners demonstrated by the interviewers. He appeared to confuse them with his direct, plain-speaking rebuke. In a final apparent attempt to offer an olive branch of humor to Brzezinski, Brand quipped "this woman is a shaft grasper" after she appeared to nervously stroke her water bottle.

=== Relationship with Donald Trump ===
Early in 2016, the show and its hosts were criticized for their support to then-candidate Donald Trump; Matt Taibbi described the hosts as "lapdogs" and their relationship as "brown-nosing". The criticism was further exacerbated by a hot mic recording published by Harry Shearer on his podcast, where Scarborough and Brzezinski discuss with Trump the positive coverage of him, and the possible questions the candidate could get in their upcoming interview.

In late June 2017, a conflict erupted between the hosts of Morning Joe and President Trump. On the morning of June 29, the president posted a series of tweets mocking Scarborough and Brzezinski, with his comments about the latter widely condemned as misogynistic. The hosts responded with an op-ed in The Washington Post, in which they described White House officials warning them of a negative article that would be published in the National Enquirer if they refused to apologize for their coverage of Trump. Although the initial tweets received negative responses from both Republican politicians and political commentators including Speaker of the House Paul Ryan, Trump retaliated on July 1 with another tweet describing Scarborough as "crazy" and Brzezinski as "dumb as a rock".

Ten days after Trump's election in November 2024, Scarborough and Brzezinski met with Trump at Mar-a-Lago. Announcing this visit on their November 18 show, they told viewers they intended to "restart communications" with Trump. In the aftermath of the meeting with US president-elect Donald Trump, ratings declined by 15% overall and by 41% in the key 25-to-54 demographic.

Preceded by Way Too Early with Ali Vitali	MS NOW Weekday Lineup; 6:00AM – 9:00AM	Succeeded by Money, Power, Politics with Stephanie Ruhle
