= Madness: Race and Insanity in a Jim Crow Asylum =

2024 non-fiction book by Antonia Hylton

- First edition cover
- Author: Antonia Hylton
- Publisher: Legacy Lit/Hachette Book Group
- Publication date: January 23, 2024
- ISBN: 978-1538723692

Madness: Race and Insanity in a Jim Crow Asylum is a 2024 non-fiction book by Antonia Hylton. It details the history and legacy of Crownsville Hospital, a segregated psychiatric hospital which operated from 1911 to 2004 in Maryland.

== Summary ==
The book follows the 93-year history of the former Crownsville Hospital, originally known as the Maryland Hospital for the Negro Insane, in Crownsville, Maryland, which served as a segregated psychiatric hospital for Black citizens. Hylton recounts the hospital's 1911 construction, where the twelve Black men who were the hospital's first set of patients were made to clear land and erect the building, and its subsequent history of abuse, forced labor, and overcrowding, at one point having over 2,700 occupants despite having only 1,500 acres of land, before ultimately shutting down in 2004. There is also discussion of the hospital's role and legacy in the broader context of medical racism, anti-Black racism, and the 2023 killing of Jordan Neely.

== Reception ==
Kirkus Reviews gave the book a starred review, which concluded that Madness was "an excellent work of journalism and a strong contribution to the literature of both mental health care and civil rights." Mason Bennett of Library Journal stated "This well-researched title is an important chronicle of the treatment of Black Americans and their mental health during the Jim Crow era. Beyond promoting systemic change, Hylton compels readers to look within to assess how they treat and view the people around them."

The book was also reviewed in The New York Times, The Guardian, and the medical journal Occupational Therapy in Mental Health.

== See also ==
- The Immortal Life of Henrietta Lacks - 2010 book by Rebecca Skloot that also discusses Crownsville Hospital and medical racism
