= Luke Russert =

American news correspondent (born 1985)

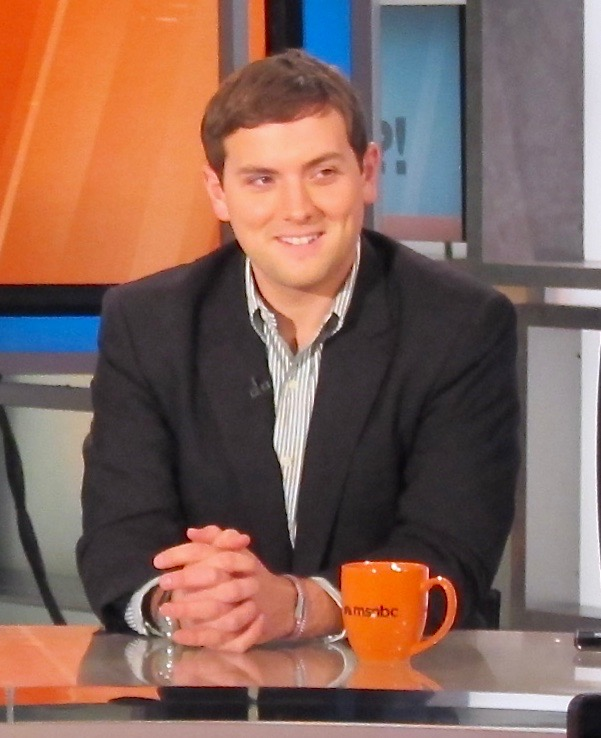
- Russert in 2012
- Born: August 22, 1985 (age 41); New York City, U.S.
- Education: Boston College (BA)
- Occupations: Author, journalist
- Spouse: Laura Lomeli (m. 2024)
- Parents: Tim Russert; Maureen Orth

Luke Orth Russert (born August 22, 1985) is an American author and broadcast news correspondent who works for MS NOW. He previously worked for NBC News from 2008 to 2016. His reporting has been shown on NBC Nightly News, TODAY, NBCNews.com, and MSNBC. He has been a guest anchor on various MSNBC programs, including Morning Joe and Way Too Early with Jonathan Lemire.

In May 2023, after seven years away from media, Russert's travel memoir Look for Me There, about his three-and-a-half-year journey through six continents and more than 60 countries, was published by HarperHorizon, an imprint of HarperCollins Publishers. The book became a New York Times best-seller.

== Early life and career start ==
Russert is the son of newsman Tim Russert and Maureen Orth, a special correspondent for Vanity Fair.

Russert graduated from St. Albans School in Washington, D.C., in 2004.

He worked for ESPN's Pardon the Interruption while a student at Boston College, where he double-majored in Communications and History and graduated in 2008. Russert also co-hosted the sports talk program called 60/20 Sports on XM Satellite Radio with James Carville while at Boston College.

== Career ==
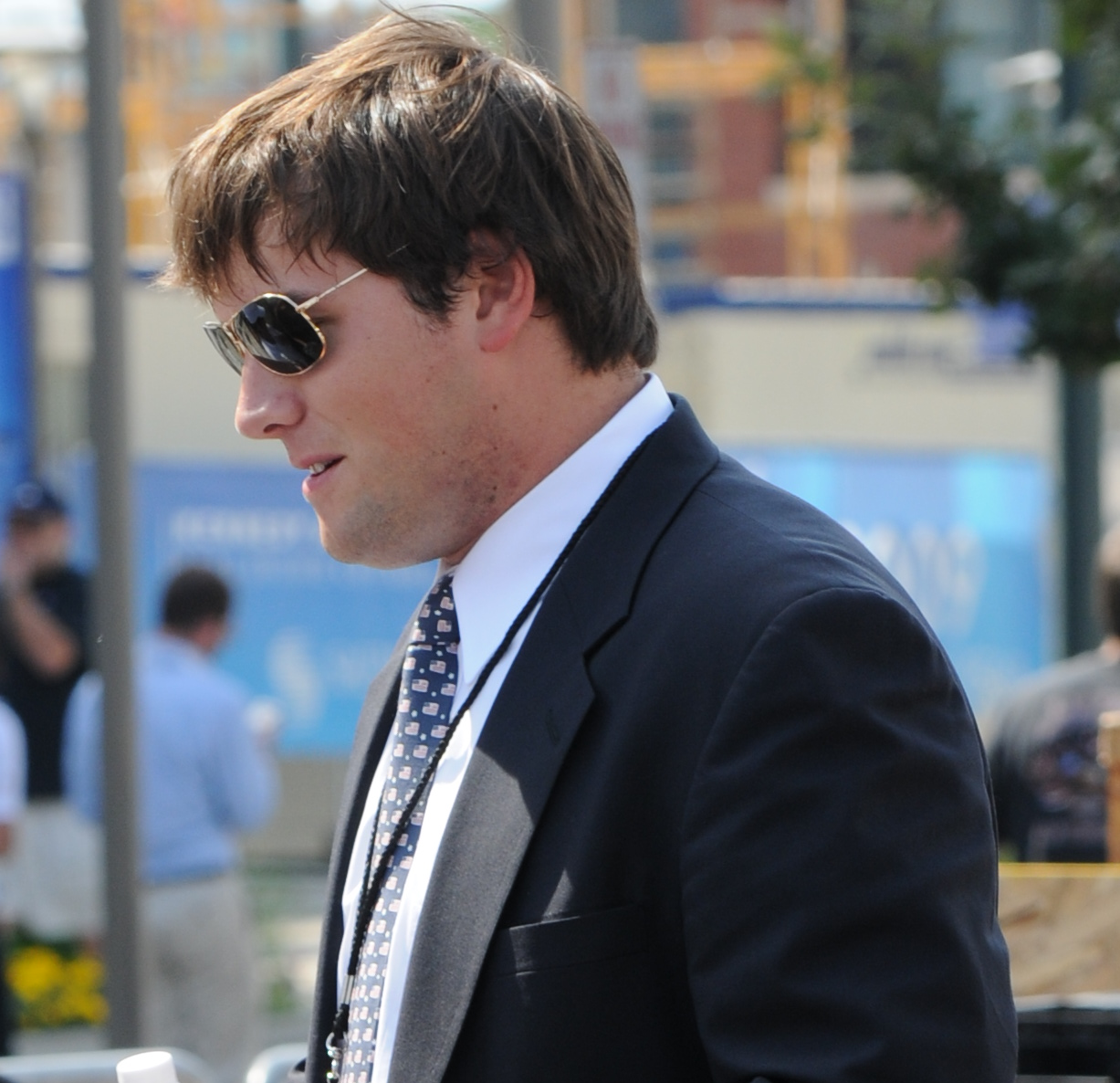
Russert at the 2008 Democratic National convention

In August 2008, two months after the death of his father, and with two years of experience of hosting a national radio show on SiriusXM, Russert was hired by NBC News as a correspondent covering youth issues as part of its coverage of the 2008 presidential election. He was assigned to cover both the Democratic and Republican conventions. His election day report, which explored the impact of Barack Obama's win on young people, contributed to NBC's News & Documentary Emmy award for its 2008 Election Night coverage.

He has acknowledged that critics in the media, including some colleagues, have leveled accusations of unqualified nepotism, because of both his father's position at NBC and his mother's position as a Vanity Fair correspondent, given that he had virtually no professional on air television experience at the time of his hiring.

From May 2009 to July 2016, he worked for NBC News on Capitol Hill as a Congressional correspondent covering the House of Representatives. He made headlines in 2010 when he received a public apology from Rep. Charlie Rangel (D-NY), who was at the time serving as House Ways and Means Committee Chairman. Congressman Rangel had criticized Russert's aggressive questioning over an ethics report that showed Rangel's fiscal indiscretions and illegal donation solicitations, but then reversed his stance and apologized to Russert instead.

In 2011, he also reported on Hurricane Irene for NBC News.

In February 2012, Russert made his primetime debut on NBC's Dateline with "Conviction", which examined whether the 1998 murder conviction of Jon-Adrian Velazquez was justified or whether Velazquez was wrongly sentenced to life imprisonment for a murder he didn't commit. The episode was nominated for a News & Documentary Emmy award for Best Report in a News Magazine.

Russert has claimed that the American media can be biased against people of religious faith, going so far as to suggest that it treats them with a certain degree of snark, labeling them as "puritanical" and "not understanding of others or of different viewpoints", which in his view is lazy and contributes to "[feeding] the snickering masses."

Russert hosted The Briefing, a web-only show on msnbc.com.

Russert suddenly resigned from NBC in July 2016, saying he needed to evaluate his career opportunities.

In December 2023, Russert rejoined MSNBC to serve as host and creative director of "MSNBC Live"—a new series of live events that would feature the network's personalities and columnists. In March 2026, it was announced that Russert would join the panel of its evening show The Weeknight, replacing Alicia Menendez (who was moving to her own daytime show).

== Personal life ==
As of 2012 Russert was involved with charitable causes that were supported by his father. On April 20, 2010, he took the role of emcee of the Boys & Girls Club of Greater Washington's annual Congressional dinner, which was renamed after his father.

He has told Politico that, as a sports junkie, he makes sure to watch ESPN's SportsCenter and College GameDay and NBC's Sunday Night Football. He also told Politico that his favorite watering holes in D.C. are Ireland's Four Fields in Woodley Park because its bartenders "pour a great Guinness, and on any given night you can catch some first-rate live music." He also likes Billy Martin's Tavern in Georgetown because "you never know who you will be seated next to at the bar. It could be a cop coming off his shift, a college student or even a congressman."

He contributed an essay titled "What I Learned From My Dad" to Parade for its June 19, 2011 issue.

Russert is a member of the Buffalo Fan Alliance Board, an organization committed to keeping the Buffalo Bills within the city of Buffalo, New York, the hometown of his father. In 2013, he said "I honestly think being a Bills fan is something that’s passed down into your blood. My grandfather was a die hard Bills fans and he passed it on to my dad. I was given a Buffalo Bills jersey when I was probably two years old, so there was really never any doubt that I’d be a Bills fan."

In 2014, he penned an introduction, dedicated to his father, for the tenth anniversary of his father's bestselling book Big Russ and Me.

Russert married Dr. Laura C. Lomeli in 2024.

On July 25, 2026, Russert and his wife had a daughter, Catalina Teresa.
