= The Last Word with Lawrence O'Donnell =

American liberal and daily television news program of the network MS NOW

- Genre: Editorial news program
- Presented by: Lawrence O'Donnell; Guest hosts (Fridays only)
- Country of origin: United States

Production
- Executive producers: Lawrence O'Donnell; Greg Kordick
- Production locations: New York City, New York; Universal City, California
- Running time: 60 minutes

Original release
- Network: MSNBC
- Release: September 27, 2010 – November 14, 2025
- Network: MS NOW
- Release: November 17, 2025 – present

Related
- The Rachel Maddow Show and The Briefing with Jen Psaki; The 11th Hour with Stephanie Ruhle

The Last Word with Lawrence O'Donnell is an American weeknight news and political commentary program on MS NOW. The program airs live at 10:00 p.m. Eastern Time Mondays through Fridays, and is hosted by Lawrence O'Donnell from Mondays to Thursdays, with rotating guest hosts (sitting for O'Donnell) on Fridays. O'Donnell is described by MSNBC as "providing the last word on the biggest issues and most compelling stories of the day."

As of May 2025, The Last Word with Lawrence O'Donnell is the second-most watched cable news program by total day and key 24-54 demo viewers in its 10 p.m. ET time slot, behind rival Gutfeld! and ahead of CNN NewsNight with Abby Phillip.

== History ==
Promotional image for The Last Word

The show originally premiered in the 10:00 pm slot Monday-Thursday on September 27, 2010, with the first episode featuring Vice President Joe Biden and Countdown host Keith Olbermann. The show was moved to the 8 pm slot in January 2011 when Olbermann's show was canceled. Last Word returned to its original 10:00 p.m. slot in October 2011.

Between March and April 2020 during the COVID-19 pandemic, MSNBC temporarily replaced the Tuesday evening broadcasts with NBC News Special Report hours either hosted by NBC Nightly News anchor Lester Holt or Today co-anchors Savannah Guthrie and Hoda Kotb.

During the 2022 United States elections, The Last Word with Lawrence O'Donnell was temporarily replaced on Fridays with The Kornacki Countdown hosted by Steve Kornacki during the 2022 midterm elections from October 14 to Election Day November 8.

Since 2024, the program also airs a recap on Sunday as part of Prime Weekend, which also recaps from The Rachel Maddow Show, Deadline: White House, The 11th Hour with Stephanie Ruhle, The Briefing with Jen Psaki, All In with Chris Hayes and The Weeknight.

== Format ==
The Last Word with Lawrence O'Donnell typically features a lengthy monologue in the "A-Block," followed by interviews and discussions with guests throughout the remainder of the show.

Replays of the show are available on MS NOW's app (accessible from the US only). The show is also available as an audio podcast. Guest hosts (every Friday night sitting in for O'Donnell) in the series include Jonathan Capehart.

== Reception ==
YouGov, a British international Internet-based market research and data analytics firm, collected 1550 interviews' worth of data between July 2020 and October 2020, and concluded: "The Last Word with Lawrence O'Donnell is the 384th most popular contemporary TV show and the 407th most famous. The Last Word with Lawrence O'Donnell is described by fans as: Smart, Helpful, Never miss it, Intelligent and Fair." It collated the ratings of American views:

- 21% POSITIVE opinion
- 12% NEGATIVE opinion
- 14% NEUTRAL opinion
- 47% HAVE HEARD OF

YouGov's other findings:

- "The Last Word with Lawrence O'Donnell" is more popular among Baby Boomers than among other age groups.
- "With 23% positive opinion, The Last Word with Lawrence O'Donnell is more popular among Men than among Women."

In April 2025, The Last Word with Lawrence O'Donnell and The Rachel Maddow Show were the only MSNBC shows to appear in the month's top 15 cable news by total viewers, with The Last Word with Lawrence O'Donnell averaging 1.442 million total viewers.

== Notable guests ==
- Joe Biden, Vice President and later President of the United States, appeared on September 27, 2010
- Kamala Harris, Vice President of the United States, appeared on December 19, 2023. Previously appeared as district attorney the night before her election as California Attorney General, November 2010
- Charlie Crist, Former member of the United States House of Representatives from Florida's 13th congressional district Florida governor, Independent candidate for U.S. Senate from Florida in 2010, appeared on September 28, 2010
- Levi Johnston, Candidate for mayor of Wasilla, Alaska, in 2011, appeared on September 28, 2010
- Michael Steele, Chairman of the Republican National Committee, appeared on October 5, 2010.
- Howard Dean, former chairman of the Democratic National Committee and former governor of Vermont, appeared October 5, 2010.
- Ron Paul, former Republican Congressman of Texas's 14th congressional district, appeared October 11, 2010.
- Valerie Plame, former CIA operative, and husband Joe Wilson appeared on October 19, 2010.
- Nancy Pelosi, Former Speaker of the House of Representatives
- Mary L. Trump, psychologist, author, and niece of Donald Trump, appeared September 17, 2020.
- Mark Kelly, United States Senator from Arizona and husband of former Democratic Congresswoman Gabby Giffords, appeared October 5, 2022.
- Condoleezza Rice, Former United States Secretary of State, appeared in 2011.

Preceded by The Rachel Maddow Show (Monday); The Briefing with Jen Psaki (Tuesday-Friday)	MS NOW Weekday Lineup; 10:00 p.m.–11:00 p.m. (ET); 1:00 am – 2:00 am (ET) (replay)	Succeeded by The 11th Hour with Ali Velshi
