= Symone Sanders-Townsend =

American political strategist and commentator (born 1989)

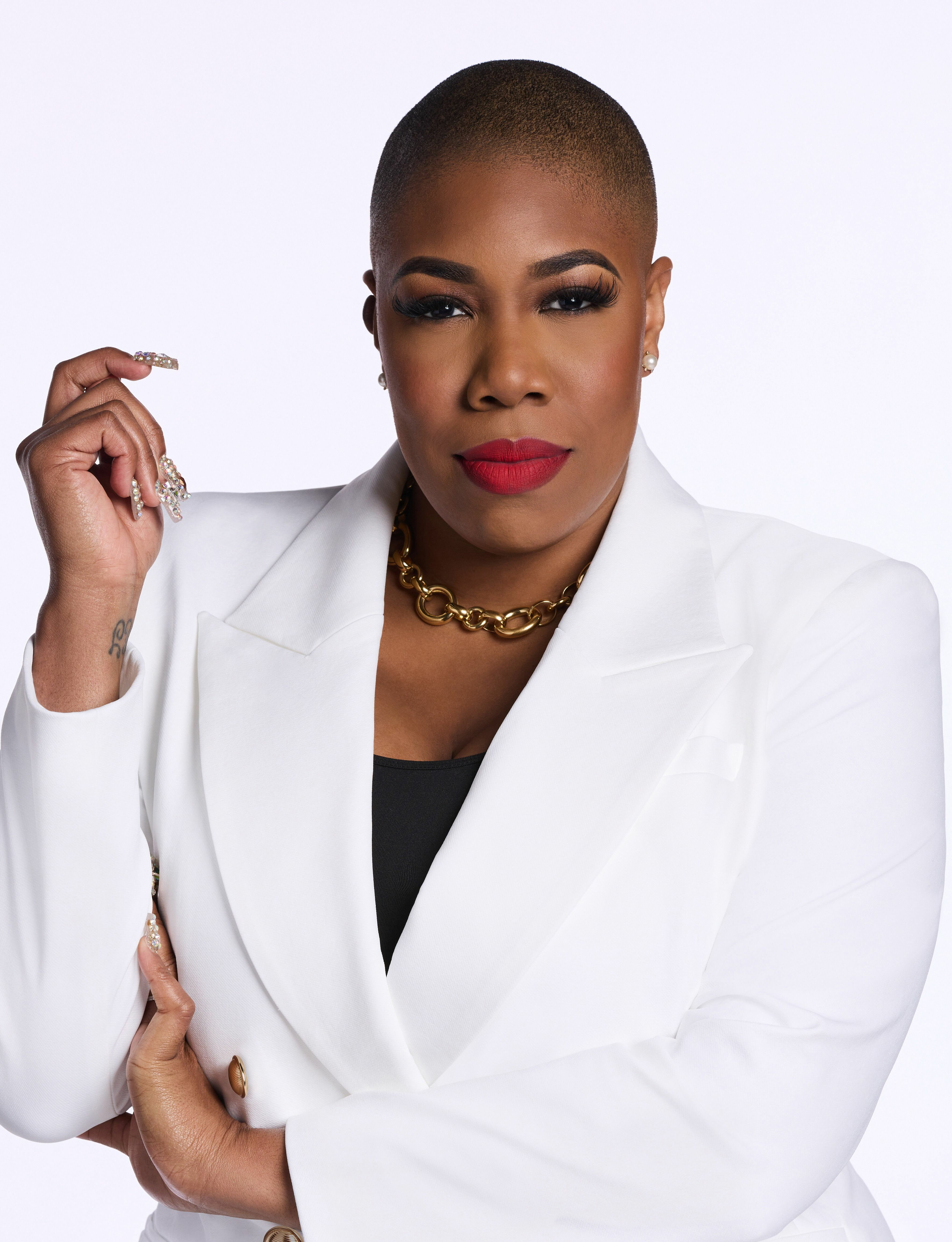
- Sanders in 2022

Personal details
- Born: Symone Danielle Sanders; December 10, 1989 (age 36) Omaha, Nebraska, U.S.
- Party: Independent (2025–present); Democratic (until 2025)
- Spouse: Shawn Townsend (m. 2022)
- Education: Creighton University (BBA)
- Website: Official website

Symone Danielle Sanders-Townsend (born December 10, 1989) is an American political strategist and political commentator who hosts MS NOW's The Weeknight. A former member of the Democratic Party, she served as national press secretary for Bernie Sanders' 2016 presidential campaign. In October 2016, she was hired as a political commentator by CNN.

In April 2019, Sanders-Townsend joined the 2020 presidential campaign of former vice president Joe Biden as a senior advisor, and after Biden won the election, was named chief spokesperson and a senior advisor for his vice president, Kamala Harris. On December 2, 2021, Sanders-Townsend announced her resignation from the White House to return to broadcasting. She currently co-hosts MS NOW's The Weekend and 7 pm ET weekday broadcasts with Alicia Menendez and Michael Steele.

== Early life ==
Sanders-Townsend was born Symone Danielle Sanders in North Omaha, Nebraska. Her father, Daniel Sanders, is retired from the U.S. Army Corps of Engineers. Her mother, Terri Sanders, is the former publisher of the Omaha Star and former executive director for the Great Plains Black History Museum.

She attended Sacred Heart Catholic School. As a child, Sanders-Townsend wanted to grow up to host her own television show. She used to walk around the house acting as Donna Burns, an imaginary television host.

Her first job was working at Time Out Foods in Omaha, a Black-owned restaurant. She graduated in 2008 from Mercy High School.

Sanders-Townsend attended Creighton University, and earned a bachelor's degree in business administration. While in college, she interned at a law firm, where she realized she didn't want to work in law.

== Career ==
Sanders-Townsend worked in the communications office of former Omaha Mayor Jim Suttle, and she was deputy communications director for Democratic gubernatorial candidate Chuck Hassebrook in 2014.

In August 2015, Sanders-Townsend joined the Bernie Sanders 2016 presidential campaign as the national press secretary. In December, Fusion listed Sanders-Townsend as one of 30 women under 30 who would shape the 2016 election.

In June 2016, following the conclusion of the primaries, she quit the Sanders campaign. Later that year, she joined CNN as an analyst and commentator, and was recognized by Rolling Stone magazine as one of 16 Young Americans Shaping the 2016 Election.

In 2019, Sanders-Townsend served as a Fellow at the USC Center for the Political Future.

She subsequently joined the presidential campaign of former vice president Joe Biden. In 2020, she published a memoir, No, You Shut Up, relating her personal experiences of speaking up to effectively fight ideological battles.

On November 29, 2020, Sanders-Townsend was named chief spokesperson and a senior advisor for Vice President Kamala Harris. On December 1, 2021, Sanders-Townsend announced her departure from that role.

Shortly thereafter, MSNBC announced she would host a weekend program for the network, as well as a program on Peacock's The Choice. The new MSNBC program, Symone, premiered on May 7, 2022.

As of November 19, 2023 the show was the 24th most popular show on MSNBC and 292nd overall on TV, watched by a total number of 438,000 people.

On November 30, 2023, MSNBC announced that Sanders-Townsend would move to weekend mornings to anchor a new program, The Weekend, along with Alicia Menendez and Michael Steele. Her weekend show on MSNBC and on Peacock, Symone, ended on January 7, 2024, with The Weekend premiering on the same day.

Starting February 24, 2025, Sanders-Townsend and her other co-hosts on The Weekend would co-host a newscast on MSNBC's weekday 7pm ET time slot which was previously occupied by Joy Reid's The ReidOut. On March 15, 2025, Sanders-Townsend announced that she was leaving the Democratic Party to become an Independent, citing the party's response to a Republican government funding bill.

== Personal life ==
Sanders-Townsend's husband is Shawn Townsend, Washington D.C.'s former "Night Mayor". The couple wed on Friday, July 15, 2022. They live in Washington, D.C.

== Works ==
- No, You Shut Up: Speaking Truth to Power and Reclaiming America. New York: Harper (2020). ISBN 0062942689
