= The Weeknight =

American news program

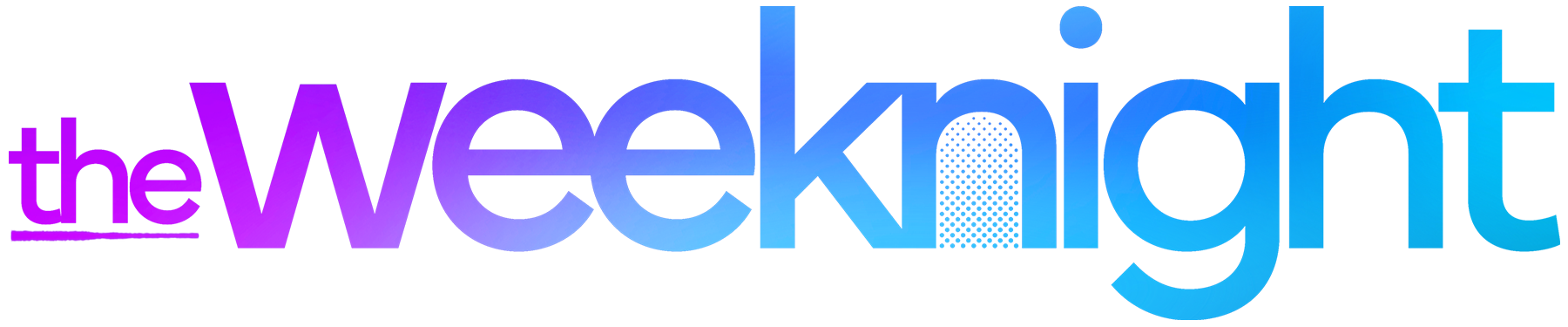
- Genre: Political news program
- Presented by: Alicia Menendez (2025-2026); Symone Sanders-Townsend; Michael Steele; Luke Russert (June 2026)
- Country of origin: United States
- Original language: English

Production
- Executive producer: Kyle Griffin
- Production locations: Washington, D.C.
- Camera setup: Multi-camera

Original release
- Network: MSNBC
- Release: May 5 – November 14, 2025
- Network: MS NOW
- Release: November 17, 2025 – present

Related
- The Weekend

The Weeknight is an American political news discussion program broadcast by MS NOW. Premiering on May 5, 2025, the program is co-hosted by Luke Russert, Symone Sanders-Townsend, and Michael Steele. It airs on weeknights at 7:00 p.m. ET.

The series is a weekday spin-off of The Weekend—a similar show that Alicia Menendez, Sanders-Townsend, and Steele had hosted from its January 2024 premiere through April 2025. Menendez would depart the show in 2026 after moving to a new daytime show, with Luke Russert taking her place.

== History ==
The Weekend originally premiered in January 2024 as part of a revamp of MSNBC's weekend morning lineup, featuring Alicia Menendez, Symone Sanders-Townsend, and Michael Steele. In February 2025, new MSNBC head Rebecca Kutler announced a revamp of the network's weekday primetime lineup, including the release of Joy Reid and cancellation of her show The ReidOut (which originally premiered in 2020 as a replacement for Hardball, following the departure of Chris Matthews), and that Menendez, Sanders-Townsend, and Steele would move to a new weeknight program in its place.

The new program was later announced as The Weeknight, with a premiere set for May 5, 2025; the program replaced The ReidOut in its 7 p.m. ET timeslot. Until June 2026, it also aired a second, 8 p.m. hour on Monday nights while All In with Chris Hayes was on a Tuesday–Friday schedule, replacing the Monday night edition of Inside with Jen Psaki (as part of the same schedule revamp, Inside concurrently moved to a 9 p.m. Tuesday–Friday slot under the new title The Briefing to replace Alex Wagner Tonight).

In June 2026, Menendez moved to the new daytime show On the Line with Alicia Menendez, with Luke Russert replacing her on The Weeknight.

== Format ==
The Weeknight and both editions of its sister programs,The Weekend and The Weekend: Primetime, roughly follow the same format as each other – featuring roundtable discussions and interviews with the show's anchors and then with key newsmakers and politicians. The show also features commentary from the anchor team.

| Preceded by The Beat with Ari Melber | MS NOW Weekday Lineup; 7:00 pm – 8:00 pm (ET) | Succeeded by All In with Chris Hayes |
