= Buchanan & Press =

- Presented by: Pat Buchanan; Bill Press
- Country of origin: United States
- Original language: English

Original release
- Network: MSNBC
- Release: July 15, 2002 – November 26, 2003

Buchanan & Press is an American debate show on MSNBC pairing former Crossfire hosts conservative Pat Buchanan and liberal Bill Press. The show was cancelled due to both hosts' opposition to the 2003 Iraq War.
