= The Rachel Maddow Show =

American weekly news and opinion television program

- Genre: Political news program
- Directed by: Rob Katko
- Presented by: Rachel Maddow
- Country of origin: United States
- Original language: English
- No. of episodes: 1500+

Production
- Executive producer: Cory Gnazzo
- Producer: Steve Benen
- Production location: New York City
- Camera setup: Multi-camera
- Running time: 60 minutes

Original release
- Network: MSNBC
- Release: September 8, 2008 – November 10, 2025
- Network: MS NOW
- Release: November 17, 2025 – present

Related
- All In with Chris Hayes; The Briefing with Jen Psaki

The Rachel Maddow Show (also abbreviated TRMS) is an American news discussion program broadcast on MS NOW (formerly MSNBC), in the 9:00 pm ET time slot Monday evenings. It is hosted by Rachel Maddow, who gained a public profile via her frequent appearances as a progressive pundit on programs aired by MSNBC. It is based on her former radio show of the same name. The show debuted on September 8, 2008.

== History ==
Promotional image for The Rachel Maddow Show

The Rachel Maddow Show premiered on September 8, 2008. Keith Olbermann, then host of MSNBC's Countdown with Keith Olbermann, was Maddow's first guest. Olbermann has been credited for persuading MSNBC to give Maddow her own program. Maddow had served as a regular guest host for Countdown when Olbermann was absent. The Rachel Maddow Show replaced Verdict with Dan Abrams.

In a 2019 segment about One America News Network (OANN), Maddow called the network "literally [...] paid Russian propaganda" based upon a Daily Beast article which reported that an OANN reporter also wrote freelance articles for the Russian state-owned Sputnik. In response, OANN sued Maddow, Comcast, MSNBC and NBCUniversal Media. U.S. District Judge Cynthia Bashant dismissed the suit in 2021, ruling that Maddow's statement was a statement of opinion (thus protected by the First Amendment) and would not be construed by a reasonable viewer as an "assertion of objective fact." Bashant also found that California's anti-SLAPP law applied, meaning that OANN had to pay the defendants' attorneys' fees.

Maddow took a hiatus from February to April 2022 and, upon returning, announced that the show would move from its daily format to weekly on Mondays beginning in May, in order to focus on podcast projects as well as to serve as executive producer for an upcoming film based on her book Bag Man: The Wild Crimes, Audacious Cover-up, and Spectacular Downfall of a Brazen Crook in the White House.

In May 2022, the program was retitled MSNBC Prime on nights that Maddow did not host. It otherwise retained the same production staff, format, and presentation as The Rachel Maddow Show, with its guest hosts often being pundits who had a similar style to Maddow. In June 2022, MSNBC announced that Alex Wagner would be Maddow's long-term replacement in the time slot on Tuesdays through Fridays beginning August 16, with her show's title later announced on August 3 as Alex Wagner Tonight.

On January 13, 2025, MSNBC announced that Maddow would temporarily return to a weeknight schedule from January 20 to April 30, 2025, to cover the first 100 days of the second presidency of Donald Trump, with Wagner reassigned to a correspondent role. Wagner's show was ultimately cancelled in a schedule revamp that occurred afterward, being replaced by The Briefing with Jen Psaki.

== Production ==
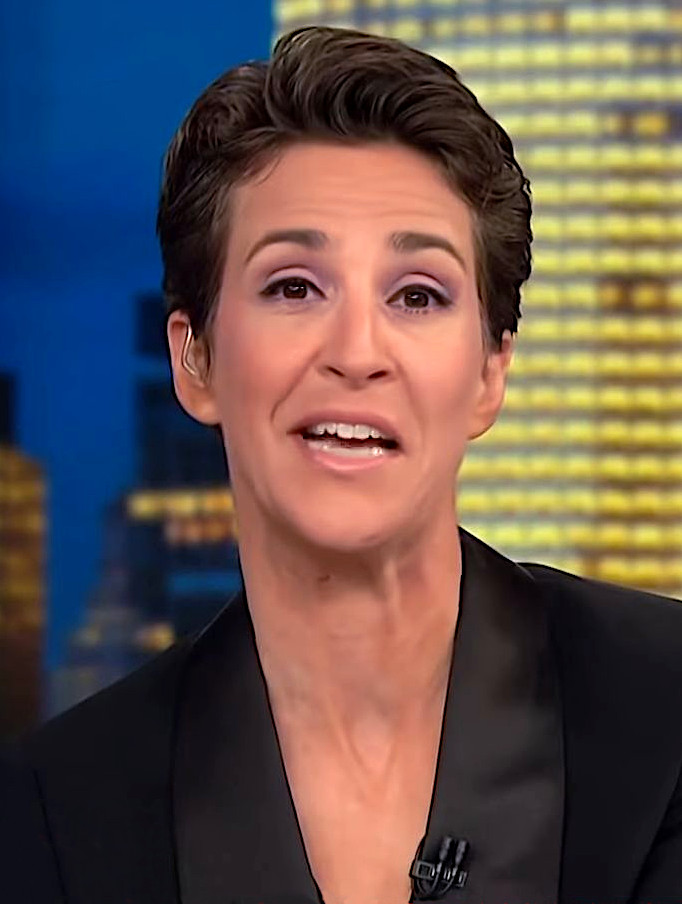
Rachel Maddow in 2018

The Rachel Maddow Show is broadcast from MS NOW studios in New York.

The broadcast is available on many platforms besides MS NOW, including ms.now, audio podcast, video podcast, text transcript, YouTube, and weblog.

The series has occasionally used theater audiences, including the 92nd Street Y in New York City on December 20–22, 2010; the Free State Brewery in Lawrence, Kansas, on February 23, 2011; and the French Quarter of New Orleans, Louisiana, on February 5, 2010 (to mark the impending Super Bowl XLIV game featuring the New Orleans Saints under the name "The Rachel Maddeaux Sheaux").

== Guest hosts ==
- Ana Marie Cox – September 4, 2009
- Howard Dean – November 24, 2009
- Melissa Harris-Perry – regular guest host prior to the launch of Melissa Harris-Perry.
- Chris Hayes – regular guest host prior to the launch of Up with Chris Hayes (Hayes now hosts All In with Chris Hayes, which used to precede Maddow's show, but now precedes Wagner's show)
- Arianna Huffington – November 17, 2008
- Ezra Klein – frequent guest host throughout 2012
- Lawrence O'Donnell – November 23, 2009, O'Donnell now succeeds Maddow's show with The Last Word with Lawrence O'Donnell
- Andrea Mitchell – April 2, 2009
- David Shuster – October 12, 2009
- Steve Kornacki – frequent guest host since 2013
- Alison Stewart – November 18–19, 2008; February 23, 2009; June 29–30/July 1, 2009; August 24–25, 2009; October 13–14, 2009
- Bill Wolff – December 30, 2010
- Joy Reid – frequent guest host from 2016 to 2019, Reid preceded Maddow's show with The ReidOut, subsequently
- Ari Melber – Guest host from 2016 to 2018, August 6, 2021, June 10, 2022, June 17, 2022
- Nicolle Wallace – frequent guest host in 2018, 2020, 2021
- Richard Lui – April 2, 2021
- Alex Wagner - February 2022, Wagner subsequently succeeded Maddow's vacated slots with Alex Wagner Tonight
- Ayman Mohyeldin – frequent guest host from 2021 to 2022
- Ali Velshi – frequent guest host from 2018 to 2022
- Mehdi Hasan – frequent guest host in 2022

== Ratings and reviews ==
=== 2008–2016 ===
The Rachel Maddow Show debuted on September 8, 2008, with 1.5 million viewers (483,000 of whom were in the 25–54 demographic). Early reviews for her show were mostly positive. Los Angeles Times journalist Matea Gold stated that Maddow "finds the right formula on MSNBC", while The Guardian wrote that Maddow has become the "star of America's cable news". Associated Press columnist David Bauder called her Keith Olbermann's "political soul mate" and referred to the consecutive Olbermann and Maddow shows as a "liberal two-hour block" that was "averaging just under 2 million viewers a night" in October 2008. New York Times writer Alessandra Stanley opined: "Her program adds a good-humored female face to a cable news channel whose prime time is dominated by unruly, often squabbling schoolboys; Ms. Maddow's deep, modulated voice is reassuringly calm after so much shrill emotionalism and catfights among the channel's aging, white male divas."

On September 16, 2008, the show drew 1.8 million viewers (with 534,000 in the 25–54 demographic), beating Larry King Live and becoming the highest-rated MSNBC show of the night. Maddow's ratings success on September 16 prompted her MSNBC colleagues on Morning Joe to congratulate her on the air, including Joe Scarborough, who said it was "just one of those times where good people do well." In the month of March 2009, the average number of viewers dropped to 1.1 million, part of a general trend in the ratings decline for cable news programs. During the third quarter of 2009, the show was ranked in third place behind Fox News's Hannity and CNN's Larry King Live. The average total number of viewers for the show's airtimes during that period was 992,000.

During the first quarter of 2010, Maddow's show pulled well ahead of Larry King Live, regularly beating the show in overall and primetime ratings and becoming the second-highest rated program in its time slot, behind only Fox News's Hannity. The show continued its lead during the second quarter of 2010, staying well ahead of CNN's Larry King Live for the third consecutive quarter and achieving higher primetime and overall ratings.

In September 2012, Maddow viewership in the 25–54 demographic topped that of Hannity on Monday and Tuesday and in the demographic's daily average for the week, though not in the week's cumulative viewership for the time slot. The week was MSNBC's strongest since February 2009. At the time, the network regularly ranked "a distant second" to Fox News viewership.

In May 2013, the show delivered its lowest-rated month—717,000 viewers—since it debuted in September 2008, and its second-lowest with adults 25–54 with 210,000 viewers in that category, finishing behind FNC's Hannity and CNN's Piers Morgan Tonight.

In November 2013, during the off-year election coverage, Maddow was "up significantly, averaging second place in both measures with 1.267 million viewers and 313,000 adults 25–54." This placed the Maddow Show second, behind Fox News' Megyn Kelly but ahead of CNN's Piers Morgan Live.

=== 2016–present ===
Following the November 2016 election of Donald Trump as president, The Rachel Maddow Show became a leading outlet for criticism of Trump, especially for the allegations that the Russian government had interfered in the election and had assisted Trump with his presidential campaign. For the week beginning February 13, 2017, Maddow's 9 p.m. ET show averaged 2.5 million total viewers, giving the host her best single week since just before the 2008 election, when the program pulled in an average of 2.6 million viewers. This also gave the show its second best week ever. In February 2017, TRMS was watched by the largest number of viewers in the show's 9-year history.

On March 14, 2017, Maddow revealed the first two pages of Trump's 2005 federal tax return on the program. The documents were obtained by journalist David Cay Johnston, who was a guest that night. Before the program aired, the White House released a statement acknowledging that Trump paid $38 million in federal income taxes in 2005. The White House also accused MSNBC of "violating the law" by discussing Trump's 2005 tax documents.

In March 2018, The Rachel Maddow Show was America's highest-rated cable news show, besting Fox News' Hannity, with Variety stating that "Maddow averaged 3.058 million viewers for the month, narrowly topping Hannity’s 3.00 million."

In ratings numbers released in July 2019, the show slipped to fifth place, with an average of 2.5 million viewers in the overall cable ratings behind Hannity with 3.3 million viewers, Tucker Carlson Tonight with 3.1 million viewers, The Ingraham Angle with 2.6 million viewers and The Five with 2.5 million viewers.

In early 2021, the show achieved its highest ratings in its history, averaging 4.3 million viewers in January and 3.7 million in February, making it the highest rated program on all of American cable television, including non-news programming, and also averaged the most viewers for cable news in the 25–54 age demographic. By June 2021, The Rachel Maddow Show had fallen to fourth place overall with 2.3 million overall viewers, and fifth place across the 25–54 demographic, averaging 289,000 viewers.

Following the show's shift to a weekly format, it was reported that viewership had increased to 2.5 million by June 2024, and was the network's highest-rated program.

== Awards and nominations ==
- 2017 Emmy Award in the Outstanding Live Interview category for the segment "One-on-One with Kellyanne Conway".
- 2017 Emmy Award in the Outstanding News Discussion & Analysis category for story "An American Disaster: The Crisis in Flint".
- 2011 News and Documentary Emmy in the Outstanding News Discussion & Analysis category for the "Good Morning, Landlocked Central Asia" series of shows broadcast from Afghanistan.
- In March 2010, Maddow won at the 21st Annual GLAAD Media Awards in the category, Outstanding TV Journalism—Newsmagazine for her segment, "Uganda Be Kidding Me" about the Uganda Anti-Homosexuality Bill.
- The Rachel Maddow Show has been nominated for a Television Critics Award twice in the "Outstanding Achievement in News & Information" category.
- Maddow received the Interfaith Alliance's 2010 Walter Cronkite Faith & Freedom Award for her "passionate coverage of the intersection of religion and politics" that "exhibits a strong personal intellect coupled with constitutional sensitivity to the proper boundaries between religion and government."
- The show received one of the Planned Parenthood Federation of America's 2010 Maggie Awards for Media Excellence "for its coverage of the health care reform debate, the murder of Dr. George Tiller and the anti-abortion movement."
- In 2012, The Rachel Maddow Show was nominated for News and Documentary Emmy in the Outstanding News Discussion and Analysis category for the "Know Nukes" segment.

Preceded by All In with Chris Hayes	MS NOW Weekday Lineup (Mondays); 9:00–10:00 p.m. (ET) midnight – 1:00 a.m. (ET) (replay); 4:00–5:00 a.m. (ET) (replay)	Succeeded by The Last Word with Lawrence O'Donnell (10 pm ET); Way Too Early with Ali Vitali (5 am ET)
