= Jonathan Capehart =

American journalist and television personality (born 1967)

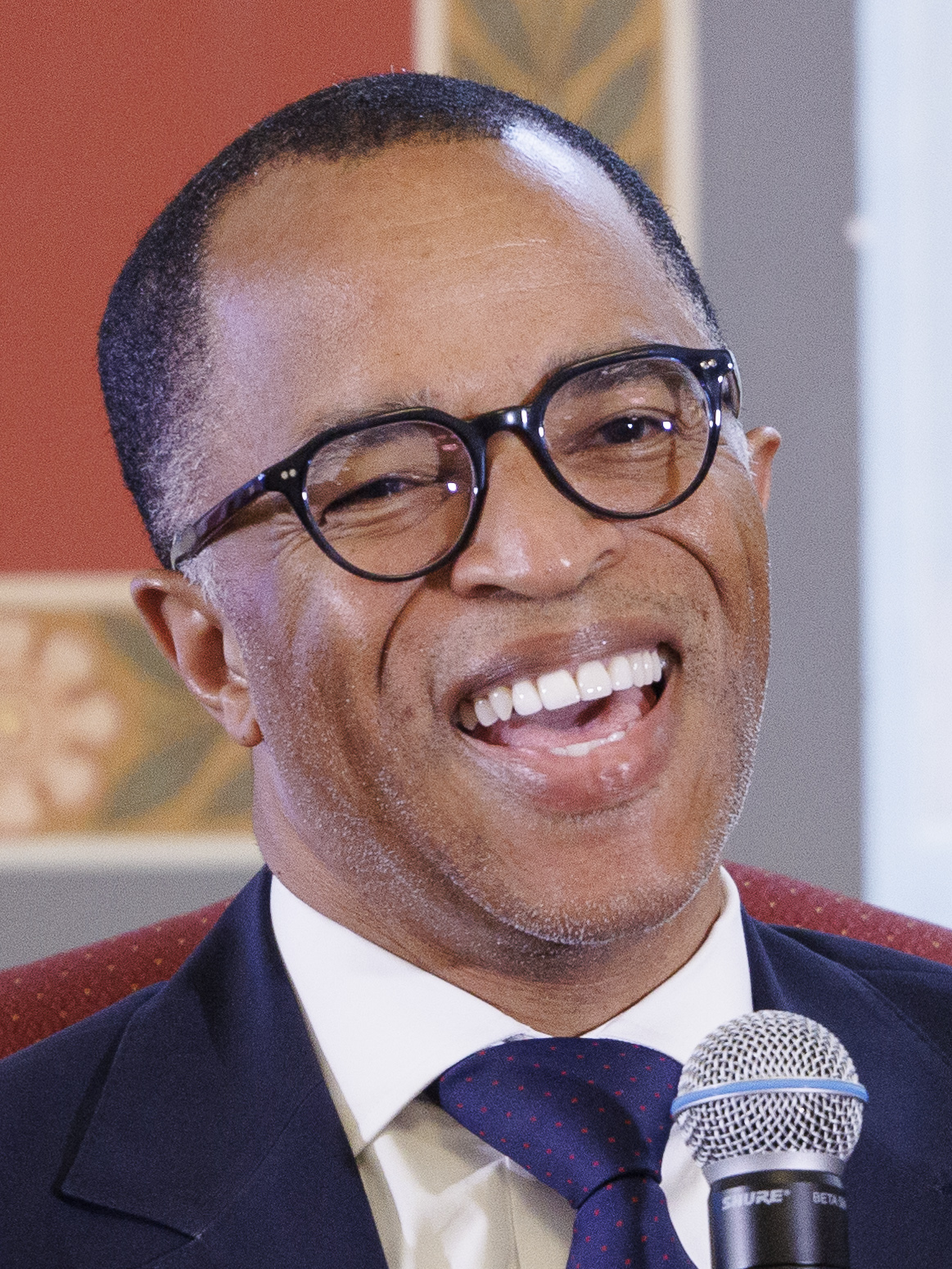
- Capehart in 2025
- Born: July 2, 1967 (age 59)
- Education: Carleton College (BA)
- Occupation: Journalist
- Employer(s): MS NOW, PBS News
- Known for: Cohost of The Weekend, political analysis on PBS News Hour
- Spouse: Nick Schmit (m. 2017)
- Awards: Pulitzer Prize for Editorial Writing (staff contributor, 1999)

Jonathan T. Capehart (born July 2, 1967) is an American journalist and liberal television commentator. Capehart began hosting MSNBC programs in 2020, and has been with the MS NOW news talk show The Weekend since 2025. Previously an opinion writer for The Washington Post, Capehart has contributed weekly political commentary on the PBS News Hour since 2021.

== Early life ==
Born July 2, 1967, Capehart grew up in Hazlet, New Jersey, the only child of Margaret Capehart. His father died when he was young. At age 16, his family moved to nearby Newark, New Jersey, after his mother remarried; and he attended Saint Benedict's Preparatory School. He received a Bachelor of Arts (B.A.) academic degree majoring in political science from Carleton College.

== Career ==
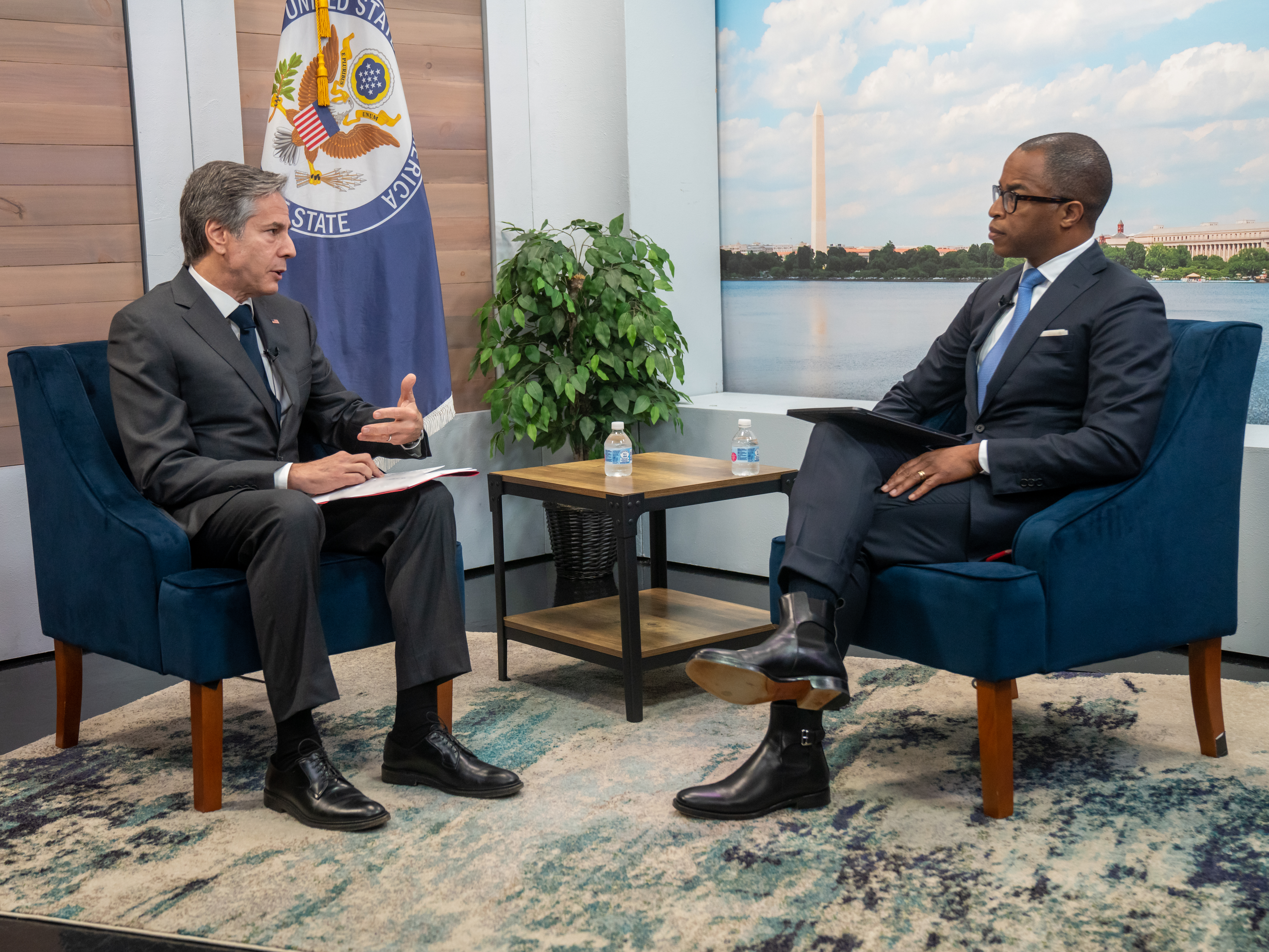
Capehart speaks with Secretary of State Antony Blinken in 2021

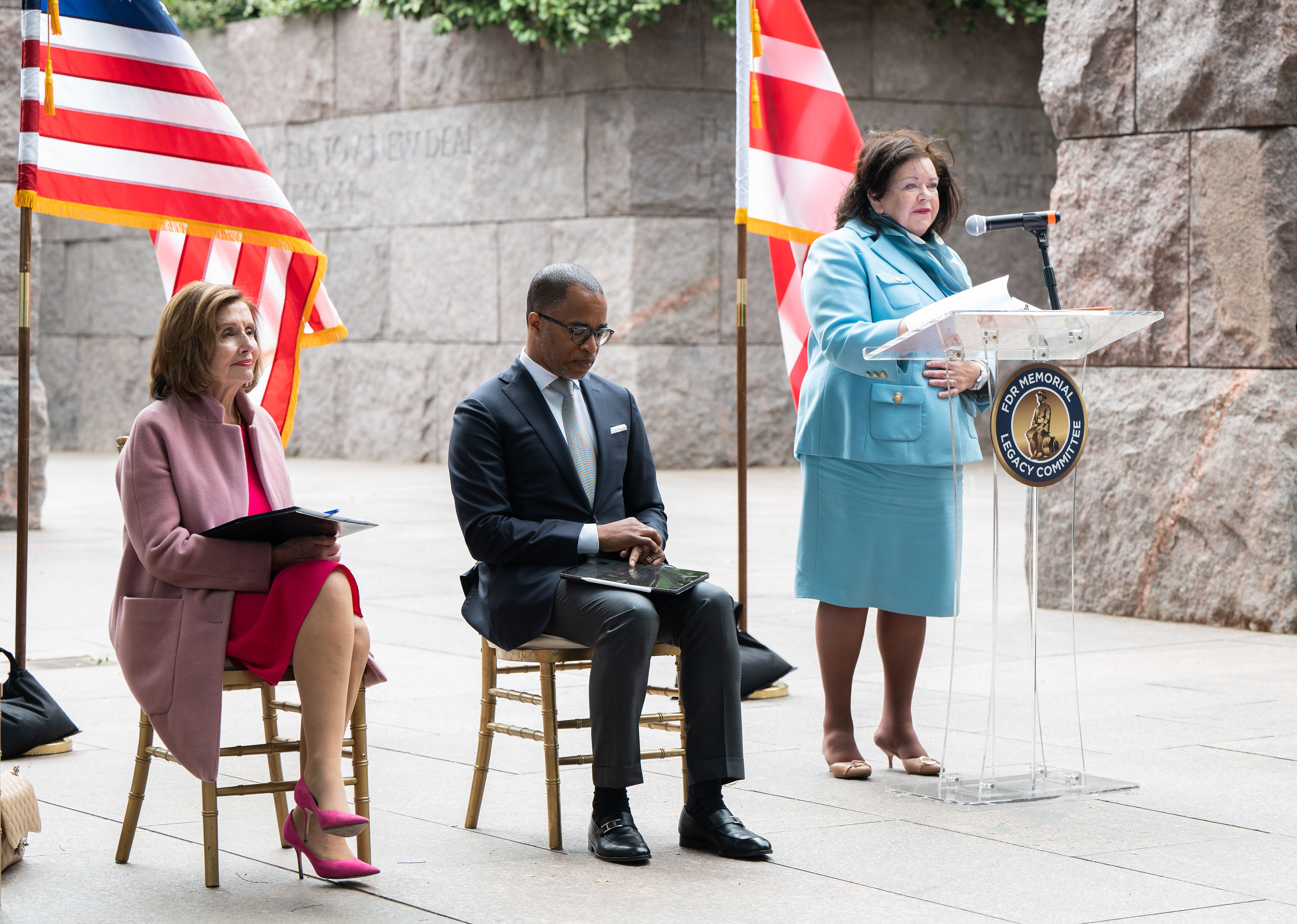
Capehart pictured with House Speaker Nancy Pelosi and Ambassador Karen Pierce in 2022

Before his work with The Washington Post and MS NOW, Capehart was a researcher for NBC's The Today Show. He worked for the New York Daily News, serving as a member of its editorial board from 1993 to 2000. At the time of his hiring, Capehart was the youngest-ever member of the newspaper's editorial board. He left the Daily News in 2000 to work at Bloomberg News. Capehart advised and wrote speeches for Michael Bloomberg during his 2001 run for New York City mayor. He returned to the New York Daily News in 2002, serving as deputy editor of the editorial page until 2004. Capehart joined the global public relations company Hill & Knowlton in December 2004 as a Senior Vice President and senior counselor of public affairs.

Capehart joined the staff of The Washington Post as a journalist and was a member of its editorial board from 2007 to 2023. He is also a contributing commentator for MS NOW. He also hosted the Cape Up podcast, in which he spoke to newsmakers about race, religion, age, gender, and cultural identity in politics.

In 2013, Capehart wrote a lengthy opinion piece for The Washington Post, responding to a Tweet made by Jack Kimble, a fictional and satirical congressman.

Capehart replaced Mark Shields in the Friday political commentary segment on the PBS NewsHour starting in January 2021. On March 30, 2022, Capehart became an associate editor of The Washington Post.

In February 2023, Capehart's The Sunday Show was expanded with a Saturday edition, "The Saturday Show with Jonathan Capehart" (this combination was sometimes promoted as The Saturday/Sunday Show with Jonathan Capehart), beginning on February 18, 2023.

In late 2024, Capehart was named one of America's 10 best TV news journalists by GALECA: The Society of LGBTQ Entertainment Critics. The organization, purveyors of the Dorian Awards to mainstream and LGBTQ-themed content, praised Capehart for his breadth of coverage across "topics like the latest in climate change, the humanitarian crisis in war-torn Sudan, and the science of aging".

Capehart has analyzed how, in concurrence with the work of Jonathan Metzl, white identity affects state-based policy making in the US, such as gun rights in Missouri and health care in Tennessee.

In July 2025, Capehart left The Washington Post after nearly two decades, accepting a voluntary buyout as part of a broader staff exodus. His final column appeared in May 2025. Capehart continues in broadcast journalism as co-host of The Weekend on MS NOW and as a political analyst on PBS NewsHour. As co-host of The Weekend, he is one of the first two openly gay black men to host an American national television program.

== False allegation about Bernie Sanders ==
In February 2016, Capehart published a false allegation about Senator Bernie Sanders, who was well known for his activism in civil rights causes. Capehart alleged that Sanders and his campaign had been misrepresenting a photograph that shows Sanders speaking at a civil rights sit-in at the University of Chicago in 1962. Capehart wrote that the Sanders campaign should "stop physically placing him where he existed only in spirit," arguing that the photo showed an activist named Rappaport, rather than Sanders, and implying that Sanders was not even at the event. That claim was refuted by the photographer/documentarian of the event, Danny Lyon, who called Capehart's claim "outrageous." Lyon provided additional photos from the event confirming that Sanders was a participant and was indeed the man in the photo, a fact later confirmed by the University of Chicago. Rather than recanting his allegation, Capehart wrote a follow-up article titled, "Bernie Sanders and the Clash of Memory," in which Capehart acknowledged Lyon's photographic evidence but said that a friend of Rappaport and a woman who was married to Rappaport for 5 years had both identified the man in the photo as Rappaport.

== Personal life ==
In May 2016, Capehart became engaged to his boyfriend of over five years, Nick Schmit, who was the assistant chief of protocol at the U.S. State Department. Capehart and Schmit were married by former U.S. attorney general Eric Holder on January 7, 2017.

Capehart was a key contributor to a New York Daily News staff entry that received the Pulitzer Prize for Editorial Writing in 1999. The series of editorials condemned the financial mismanagement of Harlem's Apollo Theater.
