= Catherine Rampell =

American opinion journalist (born 1984)

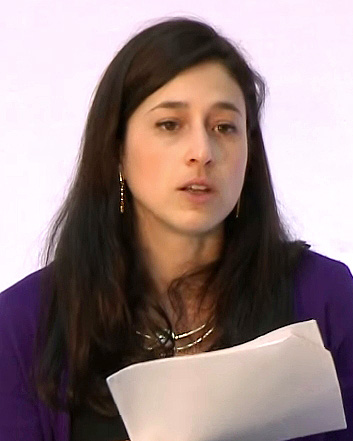
- Rampell in 2016
- Born: Catherine Chelsea Rampell; November 4, 1984 (age 41)
- Education: Princeton University (AB)
- Occupation: Journalist
- Spouse: Christopher Conlon (m. 2014)
- Website: catherinerampell.com

Catherine Chelsea Rampell (born November 4, 1984) is an American opinion journalist and nationally syndicated opinion columnist, currently with MS NOW.

== Early life and education ==
Rampell grew up in a Jewish family in South Florida, the daughter of Ellen (née Kahn), an accountant, and Richard Rampell. Both of her parents are Princeton alumni. Rampell is a graduate of Palm Beach Day Academy. Rampell graduated Phi Beta Kappa from Princeton University with a Bachelor of Arts (AB) in anthropology in 2007 after completing a 150-page-long senior thesis, titled "Hawk the Vote: Marketing Voting to American Youth", under the supervision of James A. Boon.

== Career ==
From 2014 to 2025, Rampell was an opinion columnist for The Washington Post and a member of The Washington Post Writers Group. She was also a political commentator for CNN and PBS NewsHour. Prior to joining The Washington Post, Rampell was an economics journalist, theater critic, and blogger for The New York Times.

In March 2025, Rampell was announced to be joining MS NOW as a co-anchor of The Weekend. MS NOW made sweeping changes to their lineup resulting in the cancellation of The Weekend Primetime; while Rampell and her cohosts did not leave the network completely, they had much less visible roles.

In July 2025, Rampell accepted a buyout from The Washington Post.

In November 2025, per the October 31, 2025 episode of The Bulwark podcast, she began working with The Bulwark, as an economics editor and writing a weekly newsletter, “Receipts”.

In September 2026, "Receipts with Catherine Rampell" launched as a Bulwark economics podcast.

== Personal life ==
In September 2014, Rampell married Christopher T. Conlon. Conlon has served as an Assistant Professor of Economics at Columbia University and Associate Professor of Economics at New York University's Stern School of Business.

In May 2025, it was reported that Rampell was pregnant with her first child.
