= All In with Chris Hayes =

- Genre: Political news/opinion program
- Presented by: Chris Hayes
- Country of origin: United States
- Original language: English

Production
- Executive producer: Denis Horgan
- Production location: New York City
- Camera setup: Multi-camera
- Running time: 60 minutes (with commercials)

Original release
- Network: MSNBC
- Release: April 1, 2013 – November 14, 2025
- Network: MS NOW
- Release: November 18, 2025 – present

All In with Chris Hayes is an American news television program broadcast every weeknight at 8:00 p.m. ET on MS NOW (formerly MSNBC). It is hosted by Chris Hayes, who previously hosted Up with Chris Hayes on MSNBC. The show premiered on April 1, 2013.

Similar to Up, the show's format consists of "long-form panel discussions in which the participants talk through several issues." The opening night had 859,000 total viewers, including 298,000 in the ages 25–54 demographic.

All In won its first Emmy Award in 2015 at the 36th annual News & Documentary Emmy Awards in the Outstanding News Discussion and Analysis category.

On August 23, 2019, All In began experimenting with a series of Friday-night editions presented in front of a live studio audience in Studio 6-A.

In 2023, the program had begun to feature guest hosts on Monday nights in order to accommodate Hayes' other projects. On September 7, 2023, MSNBC announced that the Monday show would be replaced by a new Monday-night edition of its Sunday program Inside with Jen Psaki beginning September 25. In May 2025, as part of a realignment of MSNBC's schedule (which also saw Psaki move to the Tuesday–Friday program The Briefing to replace Alex Wagner Tonight), Inside was replaced by a second hour of MSNBC's new panel show The Weeknight on Monday nights. In June 2026, All In returned to broadcasting on Monday nights.

Preceded by The Weeknight	MSNBC Weekday Lineup; 8:00 pm – 9:00 pm (ET); 3:00 am – 4:00 am (ET) (replay)	Succeeded by The Rachel Maddow Show (Mondays); The Briefing with Jen Psaki (Tuesdays-Fridays)
