= The Briefing with Jen Psaki =

American news program

- Also known as: Inside with Jen Psaki (2023–2025)
- Genre: Political news program
- Directed by: Rob Katko
- Country of origin: United States
- Original language: English

Production
- Executive producer: Alex Lupica
- Camera setup: Multi-camera

Original release
- Network: MSNBC
- Release: March 19, 2023 – November 14, 2025
- Network: MS NOW
- Release: November 18, 2025 – present

Related
- The Rachel Maddow Show; Alex Wagner Tonight

The Briefing with Jen Psaki is a political news program on MS NOW hosted by former White House Press Secretary Jen Psaki.

The program originally began on March 19, 2023, as a Sunday program titled Inside with Jen Psaki, and quickly became one of MSNBC's most-watched weekend programs, In September 2023, the program expanded to Monday nights, as a substitute for All In with Chris Hayes after it moved to a Tuesday–Friday schedule. On May 6, 2025, the program was retitled The Briefing and moved to MSNBC's primetime lineup on a Tuesday–Friday schedule, replacing Alex Wagner Tonight.

== History ==
Psaki described the series as aiming to step back and provide viewers with a "big picture" take on the week's events, avoiding overt partisanship, while maintaining her authentic voice as a former campaign and communications official for Democratic politicians. The show debuted on March 19, 2023; it was MSNBC's most-watched weekend premiere since January 2019, and became the network's highest-rated weekend program.

On September 25, 2023, Inside added a second, prime time edition on Mondays at 8 p.m. ET; the program substituted for All In with Chris Hayes, which had moved to a Tuesday–Friday schedule to accommodate Chris Hayes' other projects.

On May 6, 2025, as part of a larger revamp of MSNBC's prime time schedule following the first hundred days of the second Trump administration, Inside moved to a Tuesday–Friday schedule at 9 p.m. to replace Alex Wagner Tonight, and was renamed The Briefing with Jen Psaki. The rebranding came from Psaki's belief that the idea of "insiders know[ing] all the answers" felt "out of touch with the moment and what we learned from last year", and that The Briefing was more reflective of her goal of helping viewers understand the impact of developments in the White House.

Preceded by All in with Chris Hayes	MS NOW Weekday Lineup (Tuesdays to Fridays); 9:00–10:00 p.m. (ET) midnight – 1:00 a.m. (ET) (replay); 4:00–5:00 a.m. (ET) (replay)	Succeeded by The Last Word with Lawrence O'Donnell (10 pm ET); Way Too Early with Ali Vitali (5 am ET)
