= Early Today =

American early-morning news program

- Genre: Overnight and early morning news program
- Presented by: Nikki Battiste (for past anchors, see section)
- Country of origin: United States
- Original language: English
- No. of seasons: 16

Production
- Production locations: NBC Studios; New York, New York
- Camera setup: Multi-camera
- Running time: approx. 23 minutes
- Production company: NBC News Productions

Original release
- Network: NBC
- Release: September 9, 1999 – present

Related
- NBC News at Sunrise (1983–1999); Morning Joe First Look Today

Early Today is an American early morning television news program that is broadcast on NBC on weekday mornings. As an extension of Today, the program features general national and international news stories, financial and entertainment news, off-beat stories, national weather forecasts, and sports highlights.

== Overview ==
Early Today is the only early morning network newscast on any of the three largest U.S. television networks (NBC, ABC, or CBS) that is not produced jointly with an overnight news program. NBC has not aired an overnight newscast since the 1998 cancellation of NBC Nightside, which aired alongside Early Today during the latter program's first few months.

As of 2019, the program broadcasts three unique half hour shows (at 3:00 a.m., 3:30 a.m., and 4:00 a.m. Eastern Time) and is then tape delayed in a continuous half-hour loop until 8:00 a.m. Eastern Time; the show produces an additional half hour live at 6:30 a.m.

On September 11, 2017, NBC discontinued same-date reruns of CNBC's Mad Money from its late night schedule in order to accommodate the earlier live broadcast (before that date, Early Today was first broadcast live at 4:00 a.m. ET). As a result, some NBC affiliates that did not choose to fill the time period formerly occupied by the Mad Money replays with syndicated programs or infomercials following the change now air Early Today in the form of two separate editions or as a 90-minute to 2½-hour loop – in which case, the program competes against ABC's World News Now and the CBS News Roundup, effectively resulting in Early Today acting as NBC's de facto overnight network newscast, especially west of the boundary of the Central Time Zone.

The program usually airs as a lead-in to local morning newscasts on most NBC stations, although in the few markets where a morning newscast is not produced by the station, it may air in a two- to three-hour loop immediately before the start of Today, which is how it airs on the NBC News Now streaming service before leading into that service's morning newscast, Morning News Now. The show may be updated for any breaking news occurring before 7:00 a.m. Eastern Time, after which time any live breaking news requiring network-level coverage, at the station's local discretion in each time zone or network orders for live coverage, is under full oversight of Today and their staffers.

Early Today and First Look are traditionally pre-empted during the Summer and Winter Olympic Games to allow the airing of overnight replays of NBC's primetime Olympic event coverage and live coverage on the NBC broadcast network and MSNBC, along with allowing stations to fulfill syndicated programming requirements where a distributor requires their programs to still air in some form with the open slot, albeit during the overnights.

== History ==
The program's logo during its CNBC-produced run.

Former title card from the late 2000s.

Former title card from 2013–2019.

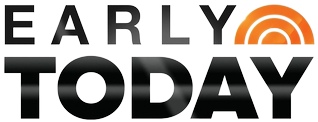
Logo used until 2024.

=== Origins ===
Early Today premiered on September 9, 1999 as a replacement for NBC News at Sunrise, which NBC decided to cancel in April 1999 as part of a major shakeup of the network's daytime and early morning schedules (these changes included the launch of another Today-branded program, the short-lived talk show Later Today, as well as the cancellation of the long-running soap opera Another World). The Early Today title had previously been used for another early morning news program produced by NBC News from 1982 to 1983 (and was replaced by NBC News at Sunrise following its cancellation), which featured the hosts of NBC's Today at the time – Jane Pauley, Bryant Gumbel and Willard Scott.

Originally produced from the former Fort Lee, New Jersey facilities of NBC's sister financial news cable network, CNBC, and focusing on business and financial news (including a modified version of the CNBC Ticker that showed stock prices and weather forecasts for select U.S. cities), the program switched to a general news format in 2004. As part of this reformatting, production of the program was relocated to the Secaucus headquarters of MSNBC. Concurrently, former Saturday Today anchor Amy Robach replaced the program's original anchor Nanette Hansen.

=== Post CNBC era ===
MSNBC's Morning Joe First Look, which aired at 5:00 a.m. Eastern Time, was a repurposed version of the network newscast using the weathercasters and segments. Until 2013, the sports segment was produced from the Los Angeles studios of NBC owned-and-operated station KNBC, using either Fred Roggin or Mario Solis as anchors; the segment was recorded after that station's 11:00 p.m. Pacific Time newscast for later airing and to account for most West Coast sports results, but was aired without any differences on both First Look and Early Today (the segment is now conducted live-to-tape during both programs from the newsroom at NBC Studios). Some segments seen on Early Today were excluded from First Look, mainly the local weather cut-in (which does not appear at all on many NBC stations that broadcast Early Today, showing only a list of forecasts for seven randomly selected U.S. cities) and a local event barker featuring a promotion for an NBC affiliate serving the city where the event was being held (which was dropped from the NBC program in 2013), while a small number of stories seen on Early Today wer not seen on First Look.

Some NBC affiliates do not air the entire program, and a purposeful sign-off is made by the show's anchor at the 24-minute mark in order to allow stations to air an early weather segment or start their morning newscast early, while NBC carries a non-essential human interest or light news story to end the telecast for stations that carry the entire program. Since NBC's corporate parent NBCUniversal acquired part-ownership of The Weather Channel in 2008, weather forecasts used on the program incorporate the channel's branding and forecasts, although Early Today used repurposed graphics systems from the defunct digital multicast weather network NBC Weather Plus, which provided forecasts for the program until it shut down in 2008.

In September 2007, the program, as with the rest of MSNBC's operations, moved from the previous Secaucus, New Jersey headquarters to the network's combined news headquarters at 30 Rockefeller Plaza in the New York City borough of Manhattan, with MSNBC, in October 2007. MSNBC's master control facilities were relocated to the CNBC Headquarters at the NBC Universal Network Organization Center in Englewood Cliffs, New Jersey. Until a revamp of the set used for both programs in 2011, the anchor background on Early Today was a video screen of a sunrise scene; a skycam shot of Manhattan was used for First Look.

On June 29, 2009, concurrent with the launch of MSNBC's high definition simulcast feed, Early Today became the first early morning network newscast to begin broadcasting in high definition.

The program had aired live at 4:30 a.m. Eastern Time until March 1, 2010, when the initial broadcast of the show was moved to 4:00 a.m. Eastern to allow stations in the Eastern Time Zone to begin their morning newscasts at 4:30 a.m. with an Early Today lead-out; previously without the new schedule in some cases, the NBC All Night repeat of Late Night with Jimmy Fallon would inexplicably lead into local news with five minutes cut off the former program if the default NBC schedule, in addition to one local half-hour program, was followed by an affiliate in the overnight hours. As of 2019, the show is offered live as early as 3:00 a.m. Eastern.

Further brand integration with Today came in December 2013, when Early Today introduced a new graphics package based on that used by the network's flagship morning show since August of that year, as well as a modified version of that program's "orange sunrise" logo.

After longtime anchor Frances Rivera retired from NBC News and broadcast journalism in the summer of 2026, Nikki Battiste was hired months after she was laid off from CBS News to anchor the early morning broadcast and contribute to Today. Her first day was on August 10.

== Notable on-air staff ==
=== Current on-air staff ===
- Nikki Battiste − anchor (August 10, 2026−present)
- Michelle Grossman – meteorologist (2022–present)

=== Former on-air staff ===
Anchors

- Nanette Hansen (1999–2004; now working for Sotherby's International Realty in Smithtown, New York)
- Natalie Morales (2004; now with CBS News)
- Amy Robach (2004; now with ABC News)
- Contessa Brewer (2004–2005; now with CNBC)
- Kristine Johnson (2005–2006; currently main anchor at WCBS-TV in New York City)
- Bill Fitzgerald (2006–2007)
- Milissa Rehberger (various quarters)
- Dan Kloeffler (2007–2009, now with ABC News)
- Christina Brown (2007–2010)
- Lynn Smith (2010–2012; later with HLN)
- Mara Schiavocampo (2012–2013, now with ABC News)
- Veronica de la Cruz (2011–2014, now with KPIX in San Francisco)
- Betty Nguyen (2012–2016; now with WPIX in New York City)
- Richard Lui – Pacific and Mountain Time anchor (2013–2016)
- Ayman Mohyeldin – Central and Eastern Time co-anchor (2016; now an anchor on MSNBC)
- Phillip Mena (2014–2015, 2016–2023)
- Frances Rivera – anchor (2014–2015, 2016–June 18, 2026)
- Jessica Layton – anchor (temporary; June 19–August 9, 2026)

Meteorologists

- Joe Witte (1999–2003; was at NewsChannel 8 in Washington, D.C., now at Goddard Space Flight Center in Greenbelt, Maryland)
- Sean McLaughlin (2004–2005; now at KPHO-TV in Phoenix)
- Rosey Edeh (2004–2005; now at Global Television Network/CIII-DT in Toronto as co-host of The Morning Show)
- Byron Miranda (2007; now at WPIX in New York City)
- Bill Karins (2007–2022); still an NBC News meteorologist working daytime/afternoon shifts on MSNBC & NBC News NOW.
- Janessa Webb (2018–2022; now at WDCW in Washington, D.C.)

Business anchor

- Louisa Bojesen (1999–2008, was most recently at CNBC Europe until her departure on April 28, 2017)

== International broadcasts ==
MSNBC and NBC News programming, including Early Today and several other shows, is shown for several hours a day on the 24-hour news channel OSN News in the Middle East & Northern Africa region, and where available, streaming through NBC News Now, which was formerly available on Sky UK as a channel in its own right before its discontinuation in December 2023. NBC News Now was reinstated on Sky Stream and Sky Glass channel 1020 as of 2025.

== See also ==
- CBS News Mornings – a similar early morning news program on CBS
- Good Morning America First Look – a similar early morning news program on ABC
