= ZSoft Uninstaller =

- Developer(s): ZSoft Software
- Final release: 2.5 / November 18, 2010; 14 years ago
- Operating system: Microsoft Windows XP
- Available in: 15 languages in v2.5, fully translated
- License: Freeware
- Website: www.zsoft.dk

ZSoft Uninstaller is a software utility developed by ZSoft Software for Microsoft Windows XP operating systems. When users delete programs using the default uninstaller, it often fails to remove all associated files and registry entries. ZSoft Uninstaller solves this issue by capturing snapshots of the hard drive and registry before and after program installations, facilitating complete program removal.

== Features ==
ZSoft Uninstaller is designed to identify and remove residual files and registry entries left behind after uninstalling a program. It starts by examining the hard drive and registry before a program installation. Once the user installs the program they wish to analyze, ZSoft Uninstaller re-examines the same hard drive and registry, comparing the changes between the pre-installation and post-installation states. It logs each difference detected, allowing users to revisit and delete the program along with all associated files at their convenience.

ZSoft Uninstaller built-in features:

- Temp File Finder: Searches through a given directory and lists any temporary files found.
- Empty Folders Finder: Scans a directory for empty folders.

ZSoft Uninstaller supports the following languages:

- Chinese (Simplified)
- Chinese (Traditional)
- Danish
- Dutch
- English
- French
- German
- Hungarian
- Italian
- Polish
- Portuguese
- Russian
- Spanish
- Swedish
- Valencian

== See also ==
- Uninstaller
- AppZapper
- IObit Uninstaller
- Revo Uninstaller
- Windows Installer
