= Morning Joe First Look =

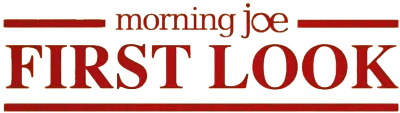
- Genre: News program
- Presented by: Yasmin Vossoughian
- Country of origin: United States
- Original language: English

Production
- Production locations: 30 Rockefeller Plaza, New York City
- Camera setup: Multi-camera
- Running time: 60 minutes
- Production company: NBC News Productions

Original release
- Network: MSNBC
- Release: 2004 – September 18, 2020

Morning Joe First Look (formerly First Look) is an American breakfast television that aired on MSNBC. It was broadcast live on weekday mornings at 5 a.m. Eastern Time Zone, and competed with CNN's Early Start and Fox News' Fox & Friends First. The program was last anchored by Yasmin Vossoughian.

== Format ==
Morning Joe First Look consists of many of the same segments and was produced by the same staff as NBC's early morning news program Early Today; some segments, such as a local weather cut-in and some feature stories, are either excluded or changed for the MSNBC broadcast, along with the anchor background (an early morning skycam shot of Manhattan on First Look, and sunrise scenes for Early Today) and graphical styling. There is a segment that is exclusive to the MSNBC newscast, a segment aired before the entertainment news summary at the end of the program, featuring excerpts from the monologue of the previous night/weeknight's episode of either The Tonight Show Starring Jimmy Fallon or Late Night with Seth Meyers, followed by the guest list of the upcoming episode. A replay of First Look aired at 5:30 a.m. ET before July 27, 2009, when Way Too Early premiered.

MSNBC placed the program on a short-term hiatus to test a 5 a.m. replay of both Countdown with Keith Olbermann and The Rachel Maddow Show at various times from February to April 2009; First Look was restored onto the schedule after that.

Between November 2005, when CNN cancelled Daybreak and January 2011, when CNN began simulcasting CNN International's World Business Today and World One, Early Today and Way Too Early (which formerly followed the program at 5:30 a.m. ET) were the only American morning cable news programs with a pre-6 a.m. ET start time.

First Look originally ended on July 22, 2016, with Way Too Early expanding to one hour. During the 2016 Summer Olympics on August 15, 2016, the program returned with the new title Morning Joe First Look with the latter show's logo blended into a new logo for First Look, but it retained the same format, while some Way Too Early early features were blended into what is now the second half-hour of First Look; the latter program was discontinued.

On September 10, 2020, MSNBC announced Morning Joe First Look would be replaced with a revival of Way Too Early starting on September 21.

== On-air staff ==
As Morning Joe First Look was broadcast from the same studio at 30 Rockefeller Plaza in New York City as NBC's early morning news program Early Today, the same personalities were seen on both programs. Yasmin Vossoughian served as the main anchor of the program. Louis Burgdorf began to serve as a co-anchor with the Morning Joe brand extension, and did most of his duties from the NBC News control room. NBC meteorologist Bill Karins provided the national and regional weather forecast segments.

=== Former on-air staff ===
Anchors

- Natalie Morales (2004)
- Amy Robach (2004)
- Contessa Brewer (2004–2005)
- Kristine Johnson (2005–2006; currently main anchor at WCBS-TV in New York City)
- Bill Fitzgerald (2006–2007)
- Milissa Rehberger (various quarters)
- Dan Kloeffler (2007–2009)
- Christina Brown (2007–2010)
- Lynn Berry (2010–2012)
- Mara Schiavocampo (2012–2013)
- Veronica de La Cruz (2011–2014)
- Frances Rivera (2014–2015, 2016)
- Betty Nguyen (2014–2016); now at WFOR-TV in Florida)
- Alex Witt (2016–2017)
- Ali Velshi (2016)
- Ayman Mohyeldin (2017–2020; currently on MSNOW)

Meteorologists

- Sean McLaughlin (2004–2005; now at KPHO-TV in Phoenix)
- Rosey Edeh (2004–2005; now appears on The Morning Show in Canada)
- Byron Miranda (2007); now at WPIX in New York City
- Bill Karins (2006, 2007–2020)

== International broadcasts ==
MSNBC and NBC News programs, including Morning Joe First Look, are shown for several hours a day on the 24-hour news network OSN News in MENA Region.
