= CNN Pipeline =

Streaming video service by CNN

- Type: Internet streaming Television Network
- Branding: CNN Pipeline
- Country: United States
- Availability: Online (see country list)
- Owner: Time Warner
- Key people: Veronica De La Cruz; Nicole Lapin; Melissa Long; Richard Lui
- Launch date: December 5, 2005
- Dissolved: June 27, 2007
- Official website: CNN.com/pipeline/
- Replaced by: CNNgo

CNN Pipeline was an English language video news service providing both live and on-demand video to subscribers' computers via broadband Internet connections. It was part of the CNN group of news services. The service was subscription-based, and did not contain advertising like other CNN stations. The bandwidth, storage and streaming servers was provided by AOL, which is also owned by Time Warner. Each of the feeds broadcast in the 16:9 aspect ratio, however the resolution of the broadcast prohibited it from being considered a high definition channel, and in many cases not even SDTV.

== History ==
Pipeline was made available to the public on December 5, 2005, after years of planning and months of internal testing. It had replaced portions of CNN Interactive and the CNN.com website, placing that content in the subscription service.

On June 27, 2007, CNN discontinued the CNN Pipeline service, to be succeeded by a free ad-supported live-video stream starting on July 2. If the stand-alone Windows program was opened after June 27, CNN initiated an automatic uninstallation of the software from the subscriber's hard drive. CNN said that while it would continue to provide the four live video streams and video archives, it was abandoning the subscription model. According to CNN's blog, the reason they discontinued the service was to encourage a greater number of people to use the service. They stated they were not actually getting rid of Pipeline, or any of its features (other than the desktop program), rather funneling all of the content into CNN.com's video section for free. This transfer of Pipeline from a pay service to an integrated free service came at a time of video being offered online for free en masse, such as YouTube and TV networks offering full TV shows free online with ads, which did not exist at Pipeline's inception.

In September 2014, CNN announced CNNgo, an online service, effectively replacing Pipeline. The service contains many features from Pipeline, such as live shows and news clips.

== "Pipes" ==
CNN Pipeline maintained four simultaneous feeds (known as "pipes"), which had both a primary and a secondary use. From 8:00 - 20:00 EST on weekdays, the primary use was shown on the feeds, meanwhile all other times the secondary use was displayed.

Pipe Number	Primary Use	Secondary Use	24-hour broadcast
1	Main news program	CNN International simulcast	Yes
2	Raw video feed	CNN Newsource channel 1 simulcast	No
3	Raw video feed	CNN Newsource channel 2 simulcast	No
4	CNN Weather	CNN Weather / Raw video feed	Yes

NOTE: The main news program was also on from 1:00 - 2:00 EST on pipe 2 on weekends. Also on weekends, "The Best Of CNN Pipeline" was on at 9:30 AM EST and at 8PM EST is "Pipeline on Stage".

The live raw feeds was of news events as they took place around the world, and were chosen by Pipeline's producers. Graphics of headlines, stock market indexes, and sports headlines took the place of advertisements during the main news program, and also when an advertisement appeared on CNN International when being simulcasted on the service.

Contractual obligations prohibited the direct simulcasting of CNN's American news channels, "CNN" and "HLN" (unless the channel was being simulcast on CNN International). This prevented popular CNN personalities from anchoring live breaking news except when CNN International simulcasted the American service.

Subscribers also received access to much of CNN's archive through the pipeline player.

Additionally, regular featured programs found on CNN's American services were unavailable to Pipeline users. This fact was not made clear in advertisements for the service, so some American or Canadian users expecting online access to CNN and Headline News, to which they were accustomed, were disappointed.

Pipes was also used for special events as well. On September 11, 2006, the fifth anniversary of the September 11, 2001 attacks, CNN Pipeline carried a real-time rebroadcast of CNN's then-live coverage of the attacks for 15 and a half hours. Free access for Pipeline was offered for a day on November 6, 2006, in line with the US mid-term elections' coverage.

== News Program ==
CNN Pipeline's anchors were Veronica De La Cruz, Nicole Lapin, Melissa Long and Richard Lui. The four shared the anchor seat in front of a virtual studio in the CNN Center. Like other CNN stations, the anchors of CNN Pipeline conducted interviews with CNN reporters, and use CNN studios for videoconference interviews.

The program was broadcast on weekdays from 8:00 AM - 8:00 PM and weekends from 1:00 - 2:00 AM (both times Eastern Time). The news program periodically simulcasted either CNN International North America's feed, or CNN U.S. during breaking news events. Because of the compression required, CNN Pipeline could not be considered a live broadcast - however, the delay was usually in seconds.

== Prices ==
CNN Pipeline offered three levels of subscriptions:

- A one-year subscription for $24.95 USD
- A one-month subscription for $2.95 USD
- A one-day subscription (called a "Daypass") for $0.99 USD;

== Country availability ==
While CNN Pipeline was based in the United States and its programming is heavily aimed towards American viewers, users in 40 other countries were able to subscribe to the service and view Pipeline content.

Countries that were available for Pipeline subscription

- Argentina
- Australia
- Austria
- Belgium
- Brazil
- Canada
- Chile
- Czech Republic
- Denmark
- Finland
- France
- Germany
- Greece
- Hungary
- India
- Iran
- Ireland
- Israel
- Italy
- Japan
- Kuwait
- Luxembourg
- Mexico
- Netherlands
- New Zealand
- North Korea
- Norway
- Philippines
- Poland
- Portugal
- Saudi Arabia
- Singapore
- South Africa
- South Korea
- Spain
- Sweden
- Switzerland
- Turkey
- United Arab Emirates
- United Kingdom
