= Kasie DC =

American news program

- Genre: News program Talk show
- Presented by: Kasie Hunt
- Country of origin: United States
- Original language: English

Production
- Production location: Washington, D.C.
- Camera setup: Multi-camera; Single-camera
- Running time: 120 minutes

Original release
- Network: MSNBC
- Release: October 15, 2017 – September 13, 2020

Kasie DC was a Sunday night news and politics television program that aired on MSNBC, hosted by Kasie Hunt, who had been serving as NBC News' Capitol Hill correspondent, covering Congress across all NBC News and MSNBC platforms. The program premiered on October 15, 2017. Kasie DC aired Sundays from 7–9 p.m ET.

On September 10, 2020, it was announced Kasie DC would be canceled on September 13 as Hunt moved to host Way Too Early on early weekday mornings.
