= SpyHunter (security software) =

Anti-spyware program

- Developer: EnigmaSoftware.com
- Stable release: 4.28
- Operating system: Microsoft Windows, Mac OS
- Size: 82.7 MB
- Type: Anti-spyware
- License: Proprietary software Free edition: Shareware; personal use only Registered edition: Semi-annual Subscription
- Website: www.enigmasoftware.com

SpyHunter is an anti-spyware computer program for the Microsoft Windows (Windows XP and later) operating system. It is designed to remove malware, such as trojan horses, computer worms, rootkits, and other malicious software.

== Details ==
SpyHunter is currently at version 5, and receives daily definition updates. SpyHunter has a free version, which allows the user to scan their computer. Purchase is required to remove found malware. EnigmaSoftware also offers a service on its website called "ESG MalwareTracker", it shows the most infected countries where SpyHunter has detected malware.

In the paid version, the user is able to receive support from a built-in HelpDesk. SpyHunter also has a custom fix from the Spyware Helpdesk team.

== Critical reception ==
- PC Magazine gave SpyHunter a 2 out of 5 star rating in March 2004, saying it was good at spyware detection, but criticized the performance and usability.
- PC Magazine gave SpyHunter a "GOOD" rating, 3 out of 5 stars, in March 2016. The reviewer concluded, "Enigma SpyHunter 4 does what it promises, eliminating active malware and killing malware that launches at startup. But competitors deliver much more."

== Lawsuits ==
In February 2016, Enigma Software filed a lawsuit against Bleeping Computer, a computer support website. It alleged that the latter engaged in a smear campaign with the purpose of driving potential customers away from SpyHunter to affiliate competing products. In turn, Bleeping Computer filed a lawsuit against Enigma Software also for an alleged smear campaign. In March 2017, Enigma Software announced in a press release that a settlement had been reached in the lawsuit against Bleeping Computer, and that both cases would be dismissed.

In October 2016, Enigma Software filed a lawsuit against popular security software vendor, Malwarebytes, for anti-competitive behavior. The lawsuit arose after Malwarebytes' software began targeting SpyHunter as a potentially unwanted program. On November 7, 2017, Enigma's case was dismissed by the US District Court. Engima appealed to the United States Court of Appeals for the Ninth Circuit and the court reversed the lower court's decision. A panel of judges voted 2-1 that "the phrase "otherwise objectionable" does not include software that the provider finds objectionable for anti-competitive reasons." Despite this, Malwarebytes won the case on its merits after the Supreme Court denied their writ of certiorari on the immunity issue.

== Controversies ==
SpyHunter is often labeled an Potentially Unwanted Program due to its misleading results of always showing infections, including on clean computers, and injects tracking cookies into a users browser, raising concern whether it is legitimate or not. The company also floods web search results when searching for a specific threat, linking a download to SpyHunter, even if the product is not able to remove it.
