= Nanette Hansen =

American businessman

Nanette Hansen was a journalist with CBS, NBC, and CNBC. She co-hosted NBC's Early Today program from 1999 to 2004 with meteorologist Joe Witte. After leaving NBC, Hanson shifted careers to real estate, first with Corcoran Group Real Estate and currently Brokerage Manager of the East Hampton and Sag Harbor, NY offices of Sotheby's International Realty.
