= Melissa Long =

Melissa Long may refer to:

- Melissa Long (journalist), American television news anchor
- Melissa A. Long, American judge
