= Bleeping Computer =

Technology news and computer help website

- Website type: Technology news and computer help
- Available in: English
- Owner: Bleeping Computer LLC.
- Creator: Lawrence Abrams
- Website: www.bleepingcomputer.com
- Registration: Optional
- Launched: 26 January 2004; 22 years ago
- Current status: Online

Bleeping Computer is a website covering technology news and offering free computer help via its forums that was created by Lawrence Abrams in 2004. It publishes news focusing heavily on cybersecurity, but also covers other topics including computer software, computer hardware, operating system and general technology.

In 2018, Bleeping Computer was added as an associate partner to the Europol NoMoreRansom project for the ransomware information and decryption tools provided by the site.

== History ==
BleepingComputer was founded in 2004 after Abrams could not find existing technical support sites that could offer easy-to-understand instructions for his friends and family.

The domain name bleepingcomputer.com originates from the sounds made by a broken computer and because a user might want to curse at a computer when it does not work properly.

Since the CryptoLocker ransomware attack in September 2013, and a subsequent DDoS of the site due to its reporting on the new malware, Bleeping Computer has been reporting on new ransomware families as they are released.

== Content ==
The articles published at Bleeping Computer are categorized as news articles, tutorials and virus removal guides. Its content includes searchable databases for looking up Windows start-up programs and uninstall entries, as well as a free Internet forum to receive computer help.

The site covers news released by researchers and companies, but also performs in-house investigative reporting and analysis of ransomware and malware.

Free decryptors to unlock files encrypted by various ransomware families have been released through the forums or the site's news section by third-party researchers.

Government agencies have included Bleeping Computer cybersecurity articles and analysis in numerous advisories.

Bleeping Computer's reporting has been cited by major media that cover technology and IT security news.

The site used to offer a malware removal training program through its forums that teaches volunteers how to remove Windows infections using various tools, including Combofix, HijackThis, DDS, OTL, GMER, Malwarebytes' Anti-Malware and Rkill, developed by Abrams.

== Legal issues ==
In early February 2016, Enigma Software, the developers of the anti-malware suite SpyHunter, filed a lawsuit against Bleeping Computer in response to a negative review of SpyHunter, alleging a campaign to damage the reputation of their company and product. Bleeping Computer requested financial aid from its readers to help pay legal fees arising from the lawsuit. At the beginning of August 2016, Bleeping Computer filed its own lawsuit against Enigma Software for an alleged long-running smear campaign against Bleeping Computer. The lawsuit against BleepingComputer ended in settlement, with BleepingComputer removing Quietman7's posts on Enigma Software's product.

== See also ==
- Technology journalism
