= Ali Vitali =

American journalist

- Born: March 22, 1990 (age 35)
- Education: Tulane University (BA)
- Occupation: Journalist

Ali Vitali (born March 22, 1990) is an American broadcast journalist and author.

== Early life ==
Ali Vitali was born on March 22, 1990 to Lou and Angela Vitali. She grew up in Briarcliff Manor, New York with a younger sister.

Vitali enrolled at Tulane University, in which she was a double major in political science and communications and a minor in English. In 2012, she graduated as a magna cum laude presidential scholar with departmental honors.

== Career ==
In 2011, Vitali interned for NBC's Late Night with Jimmy Fallon. A year later, she joined ABC News as a production and development assistant. In 2013, she left ABC News to join Sweet Lemon Media, an online lifestyle magazine, where she served as vice president and managing editor until 2014.

Meanwhile, Vitali joined NBC News in 2012. Within their division, she joined MSNBC as a multimedia editor and then became a graphics producer for The Cycle.

In July 2015, Vitali was selected as a political campaign embed reporter for NBC News, covering the 2016 United States presidential campaign. While reporting on Donald Trump's 2016 presidential run, she told her alma mater: "I like to think of my day as a list of things I can do to best tell a story. I shoot video, write for NBCNews.com, tweet, Snapchat and report on-air — embeds wear so many hats on the road. Some days I'm doing all of those things in the span of a few hours, but it's always something new, which makes every day an adventure."

During the first Trump administration, Vitali served as a White House reporter for NBC News Digital. In 2018, Vitali moved from covering the White House to monitor the 2018 midterm elections.

For the 2020 United States presidential election, Vitali covered the Democratic presidential primary campaigns of Elizabeth Warren, Amy Klobuchar, and Michael Bloomberg. In September 2021, Vitali was named as the Capitol Hill correspondent for NBC News.

In 2022, Vitali published her first book Electable: Why America Hasn't Put A Woman In The White House...Yet, which grew from her coverage of Warren, Klobuchar, Kirsten Gillibrand, and Kamala Harris's 2020 presidential campaigns.

In December 2024, it was reported that Vitali would anchor MSNBC's early morning news program Way Too Early starting in January 2025, replacing Jonathan Lemire, who moved to co-host Morning Joe's 9 a.m. hour. In August 2025, Vitali was named as the network's senior Capitol Hill correspondent.

== Works ==
- Electable: Why America Hasn't Put A Woman In The White House...Yet, Dey Street Books, 2022. ISBN 9780063058637
