= Marcin Kleczynski =

Polish-American programmer and businessman

- Born: November 1, 1989 (age 36); Łódź, Poland
- Education: University of Illinois Urbana-Champaign (BS)
- Occupations: Programmer, businessman
- Known for: Co-founding the American Internet security company Malwarebytes

Marcin Kleczynski (born November 1, 1989) is the chief executive officer (CEO) and co-founder of American Internet security company, Malwarebytes. After a period working as a computer repair technician and being involved in forums in the mid-2000s, Kleczynski co-founded Malwarebytes with Bruce Harrison in January 2008. By 2014, Malwarebytes had treated over 250 million computers worldwide, with a range of popular products including Malwarebytes Anti-Malware, Malwarebytes Anti-Exploit, and more recently, advanced anti-ransomware package Endpoint Security. Kleczynski was named one of Forbes Magazine's "30 Under 30" Rising Stars of Enterprise Technology in 2015.

== Early life and background ==
Kleczynski was born in Łódź, Poland in 1989. His family emigrated to the United States when he was 3 years old. He speaks fluent Polish. As a child, he had aspirations to be a train conductor, and later, an airline pilot. He has retained his fascination with flying and obtained his pilot's license in 2011. Kleczynski attended Fenton High School in Bensenville, Illinois, and received his B.S. in computer science from the University of Illinois Urbana-Champaign in 2012 and he was a member of the Theta Chi fraternity.

== Career ==
As a teenager, Kleczynski found a job working as a technician in a computer repair shop in Chicago. It was while working at the repair shop in Chicago that Kleczynski noticed that whenever infected computers arrived, they would generally reformat the computer, regardless if the infection was only minor. It was only when his mother's computer became infected that Kleczynski learned more about why the virus wasn't directly attacked, finding that neither McAfee nor Symantec would remove the malware from his system. He later recalled "I've never been as angry as when I got my computer infected", and professed that his mother told him to fix it "under penalty of death". It was only after Kleczynski posted on the forum SpywareInfo, popular at the time, that he was able to learn how to cure it, which took three days. The company was unofficially founded after this, when Kleczynski conversed and became friends with several of the editors of the forum, who tempted him to buy an unused domain from them. As a result, Malwarebytes was informally established in 2004.

Kleczynski began writing his own free software tools in Visual Basic. With one of the site's regulars, Bruce Harrison, Kleczynski wrote the inaugural version of the company's software. In 2006, worked with a college roommate to produce a freely available program called "RogueRemover", a utility which specialized in fighting against a type of infection known as "rogues", which scam computer users into giving away their credit card information through fake anti-virus software. RogueRemover proved instrumental in developing Malwarebytes Anti-Malware, and Kleczynski was able to set up a forum which enabled him to improve the software through feedback. Kleczynski and Harrison formally launched Malwarebytes on January 21, 2008 while Kleczynski was studying computer science at the University of Illinois Urbana-Champaign. Bruce became the VP of Research for Malwarebytes and he further hired Doug Swanson, an experienced freeware development technician. Kleczynski and Harrison reportedly made $600,000 in their first year of selling the software, despite not having met personally at the time. Kleczynski reportedly made his first million by the time he was 19.

In 2014, Malwarebytes received $30 million in funding from Highland Capital, and by the following year it announced that it had treated 250 million computers worldwide, representing about 20-25% of working business computers. In June 2015, Kleczynski moved the firm's headquarters from 10 Almaden Boulevard in San Jose, California to a new 52,000 square feet (4,800 m^{2}) office space on the two top floors of the 12-story 3979 Freedom Circle in Santa Clara, California. The new office is more than twice the size of the former office. The company reported a growth of 10 million users in just one year, from 25 to 35 million active users at the time, and an increase in revenue by 1653 % in 2014. In January 2016, Malwarebytes unveiled advanced anti-ransomware package Endpoint Security, and announced that it had raised $50 million in investment from Fidelity Management and Research Company.

Working with the Malwarebytes team, Kleczynski has delivered several popular products in the Internet security field, including Malwarebytes Anti-Malware, which offers "real-time protection against malware, automated scanning, and automatic updating". Malwarebytes Anti-Malware Mobile, a free Android app which protects smartphones, Malwarebytes Anti-Exploit, which protects vulnerable programs from attack, and Malwarebytes Endpoint Security, an advanced anti-ransomware package. Kleczynski cited the reason for launching the anti-ransomware technology in 2016: "In the last six to 12 months, this has just gone so aggressively to the business environment. We see companies from 25 people all the way to 250,000 people getting hit with ransomware".

== Awards and philanthropy ==
In 2014, Kleczynski won the Silicon Valley Business Journal's 40 Under 40 award, and the Ernst & Young Entrepreneur of the Year Award. In 2015 he was named one of Forbes Magazine's '30 Under 30' Rising Stars of Enterprise Technology.

According to Silicon Valley Business Journal, as of 2015 Kleczynski was an investor in Electronic Frontier Foundation, a nonprofit specializing in online privacy, and the Tech Museum of Innovation in San Jose.
