= Spy Hunter (disambiguation) =

Spy hunter may refer to:

== Video games ==
=== Original ===
- Spy Hunter, a 1983 arcade game
- Spy Hunter II, a direct sequel to the 1983 original, released in 1987
- Super Spy Hunter, a 1992 video game developed by Sunsoft originally known as Battle Formula

=== Remakes ===
- SpyHunter, a 2001 video game remake by Midway Games
- SpyHunter 2, a 2003 sequel to Midway Games' 2001 remake
- SpyHunter: Nowhere to Run, a 2006 game, the third in the series
- Spy Hunter (2012 video game), the latest release

== Other uses ==
- "Spy Hunter", a song by Christian rock band Project 86
- Samurai Spy, a 1965 film also known as Spy Hunter
- SpyHunter (security software), an anti-spyware program for Microsoft Windows
- Spyhunter, a 2014 book by Michael Shrimpton
