= Milissa Rehberger =

American television journalist

Millissa Rehberger
- Education: Hobart and William Smith Colleges, 1993
- Occupation: Television journalist
- Notable credit(s): Today, MSNBC Live
- Title: MSNBC News Co-anchor

Milissa Rehberger is an American television journalist. She joined the 24-hour cable news television channel MSNBC in December 2003 as a freelance anchor and reporter. In July 2004 she was named anchor of its primetime news updates. Most recently Rehberger spent some time anchoring NBC's Early Today and MSNBC's First Look. Currently, Rehberger hosts prime time news breaks during MSNBC weeknight and weekend programming. In addition, she fills-in as anchor on MSNBC Live.

== Education and early career ==
Rehberger is a 1993 graduate of Hobart and William Smith Colleges, and previously served as co-anchor for WOFL-TV in Orlando, Florida. Further, she was the morning and noon anchor of KOCO-TV in Oklahoma City. Before that, she worked at CBS affiliates WSPA-TV in Spartanburg, South Carolina and WDEF-TV in Chattanooga, Tennessee.

She currently lives in New York City.
