= Christina Brown =

Anchor for MSNBC

- Education: Columbia University; University of Phoenix
- Occupations: Television journalist U.S. Air Force Veteran
- Notable credit(s): KTSM-TV; KTNV-TV; MSNBC; NBC News
- Website: https://www.nbcnews.com/id/wbna19836906 MSNBC biography

Christina Brown is a journalist, formerly an anchor and correspondent for MSNBC and NBC News.

She began working for MSNBC in June 2007 as anchor of overnight newsbreaks and the early morning programs Early Today and First Look, after five years with KTNV-TV in Las Vegas, Nevada and two years with KTSM-TV in El Paso, Texas, She left MSNBC/NBC News in 2010, She is now anchor of Arise News. She got her start in Radio/TV while enlisted in the Air Force. She is a graduate of the University of Phoenix. She holds a MS: Journalism, from Columbia University Graduate School of Journalism. She is also a veteran of the United States Air Force.
