= Bill Karins =

American television meteorologist

- Born: William J. Karins; April 14, 1974 (age 51); Albany, New York
- Occupation: Meteorologist
- Employer(s): NBC News and The Weather Channel

William J. Karins (born April 14, 1974) is an American meteorologist, working for NBC News. He is currently seen primarily on NBC's Early Today, Hallie Jackson NOW and Top Story with Tom Llamas. He also occasionally reports weekdays for MSNBC's First Look, Way Too Early, Morning Joe, MSNBC Live and CNBC. Prior to being named an NBC meteorologist, Karins was one of the original meteorologists for the now shuttered NBC Weather Plus. From 2009 to 2012, Karins had been the meteorologist on Weekend Today on Saturdays. Karins was briefly one of several substitute hosts for Way Too Early during the departure of Willie Geist from the show for his Today hosting duties. He has also appeared as a fill-in for Al Roker on Today, and for Dylan Dreyer on Weekend Today.

Karins was born in Albany, New York. He is a graduate of the State University of New York at Oneonta. Prior to working at NBC, he was a meteorologist at KSNT in Topeka, Kansas, and at WCTI in New Bern, North Carolina. He also worked in Bangor, Maine for WABI-TV.
