= CNNgo =

Online streaming platform of CNN

CNN app
- Country: United States of America

Ownership
- Owner: CNN
- Sister channels: CNN; CNN International; HLN

History
- Replaced: CNN Pipeline

Availability

Streaming media
- Online Web Site: cnn.com/videos/live
- Apple TV: CNN on Apple TV
- iOS: CNN on iPad, iPhone
- Amazon Fire TV: CNN on Amazon Fire TV
- Roku: CNN on Roku

The CNN app (whose video component is formerly known as CNNgo) is the online streaming platform of CNN. The website and corresponding streaming apps require a user to enter their TV Everywhere cable television user name and password to access live channels like CNN, CNN International and HLN broadcasts and entire episodes of CNN shows, but watching news clips are typically free. In 2025, a CNN All Access subscription plan was developed to provide users without a television subscription to a large range of content through the app and website.

== History ==
CNN initially announced they were offering CNNgo on September 30, 2014. CNNgo allowed users to watch a live CNN video feed, on demand shows and short clips from CNN.com at http://cnn.com/go. This was very similar to CNN Pipeline in that it allows viewers to watch CNN live, users must enter cable television credentials before watching live television, but you can watch news clips for free. However, unlike Pipeline, users are not required to pay extra if they have a cable provider. Another difference is that there is still no paid option, meaning users cannot watch CNN live if they don't have cable TV.

CNN then announced they were bringing CNNgo to the Apple TV, amidst a wave of new channels being brought to the Apple TV. However, some users complained of not being able to sign into the Apple TV channel with as many credentials as with the apps or website. In 2022, CNNgo was merged into the CNN app.
