= Way Too Early =

American television news program

- Genre: Morning news show
- Starring: Ali Vitali
- Country of origin: United States
- Original language: English

Production
- Executive producer: Dan Norwick
- Production location: New York City
- Running time: 60 minutes

Original release
- Network: MSNBC
- Release: July 27, 2009 – August 12, 2016
- Release: September 21, 2020 – November 14, 2025
- Network: MS NOW
- Release: November 17, 2025 – present

Related
- Morning Joe

Way Too Early is an American early morning news show that airs weekday mornings on MS NOW.

The first incarnation of Way Too Early premiered on July 27, 2009, hosted by Willie Geist. It was later hosted by a variety of NBC News on-air talent, including Thomas Roberts and others on a temporary basis, including Ayman Mohyeldin. The final hosts were Chief White House Correspondent Chris Jansing and Frances Rivera. It originally ended on August 12, 2016, as its lead-in program First Look was expanded back into the full hour and rebranded as Morning Joe First Look to build continuity with the later program.

On September 10, 2020, MSNBC announced that Way Too Early would be revived beginning September 21, with Kasie Hunt as anchor. Hunt would depart the network on July 16, 2021; Jonathan Lemire was named as her replacement on October 25. In December 2024, it was announced that Lemire would move to Morning Joe, and that Ali Vitali would become the new host of Way Too Early in January 2025.

== History ==
Phil Griffin, President of MSNBC, announced the show on July 15, 2009, and described it as a "pre-game show" for Morning Joe. Mike Barnicle often filled in for original host Willie Geist, jokingly referring to the show as "Way Too Old (or Elderly) with Mike Barnicle", while Peter Alexander also covered for Geist. On September 24, 2012, NBC News announced that Geist would be named co-host of the 9 a.m. hour of Today, filling the co-host slot formerly held by Savannah Guthrie (who now anchors the 7-9 a.m. portion of the morning program).

The original executive producer was Chris Licht, who was also the co-creator and executive producer of Morning Joe before leaving MSNBC to become executive producer of CBS This Morning and Vice President of Programming at CBS.

Way Too Early was not branded "Brewed by Starbucks" like Morning Joe until the sponsorship deal expired in September 2013. Both shows had similar graphics packages, are broadcast from the same set, and frequently reference each other.

On May 8, 2013, MSNBC announced that CNBC reporter Brian Shactman would be the new regular host of Way Too Early. He began his anchoring duties for the show May 13, 2013.

On January 3, 2014, MSNBC announced that Thomas Roberts would be the new regular host of Way Too Early starting on January 13. Roberts left in mid 2015 to do various daytime anchor duties, with no guest host announced.

Way Too Early aired its final regular edition on July 22, 2016, from July 25 to August 12, 2016, Way Too Early expanded to 1 hour, taking over First Look briefly. The next Monday, Way Too Early was replaced by Morning Joe First Look, with a few former Way Too Early segments blended into the second half-hour.

On September 10, 2020, MSNBC announced it would replace First Look with a revival of Way Too Early, now anchored by Kasie Hunt, starting on September 21. Hunt left the program and NBC News on July 16, 2021, departing for a job at CNN (initially at its short-lived streaming service CNN+, but later moving to its competing early-morning program Early Start in August 2023). In the meantime, the show was hosted by a rotation of guest anchors, including, in particular, Jonathan Lemire; on October 25, it was announced that Lemire would become the new regular host.

On December 9, 2024, it was announced that Lemire would become a co-host of the 9 a.m. hour of Morning Joe, with Ali Vitali succeeding Lemire as host of Way Too Early beginning on January 6, 2025.

== Segments ==
Regular segments on Way Too Early have included:

- Three Questions – Beginning the show with three video clips of newsworthy events from the previous day, and posing an open-ended question relating to them.
- The News – A fast-paced round-up of the previous day's and overnight news.
- All Up In Your Business – Business and market-related news, with analysis from the CNBC London bureau.
- The Weather – National forecast from The Weather Channel, currently provided by NBC meteorologist Bill Karins.
- Sports – Highlights of the top sports stories.
- Morning Buzz – A "wake-up call" phone segment to a prominent figure, celebrity, correspondent, or politician to discuss a news topic.
- Sound Smart – Random fact or some other piece of information to help you "sound smart" during the day.
- The Cooler – Soft news stories and other conversation starters.
- Louis Burgdorf from the Control Room – Near the end of the program, Burgdorf rounds up feature, offbeat and entertainment headlines from the program's Rockefeller Center control room.
- Why Are You Up? - Viewers are asked to write in with their personal reasons for being up so early.

== Hosts ==
- Willie Geist – (July 27, 2009 – November 9, 2012)
- Brian Shactman – (May 13, 2013 – January 10, 2014)
- Thomas Roberts – (January 13, 2014– March 2, 2015)
- Amy Holmes – (March 2, 2015 – 2016)
- Chris Jansing – (July 25, 2016)
- Frances Rivera – (July 25, 2016)
- Kasie Hunt – (September 21, 2020 – July 16, 2021)
- Jonathan Lemire – (October 25, 2021 – January 3, 2025)
- Ali Vitali (January 6, 2025–present)

=== Substitute hosts ===
Substitute hosts for the show have included Luke Russert, Savannah Guthrie, Peter Alexander, Mike Barnicle, Jonathan Capehart, Jonathan Lemire, Alicia Menendez, Alex Witt, Sam Stein and Mark Halperin, with Bill Karins and Louis Burgdorf having hosted the entire program.

Preceded by The Rachel Maddow Show/The Briefing with Jen Psaki (replay, Tuesday-Friday)	MS NOW Weekday Lineup; 5:00 am – 6:00 am (ET)	Succeeded by Morning Joe
