= AppZapper =

- Developers: Austin Sarner, Brian Ball, and Clemens Knieper
- Stable release: 1.0 (AppZapper 3000)
- Operating system: macOS (macOS 15+)
- Type: Uninstaller
- License: Shareware
- Website: appzapper.com

AppZapper is an application for Apple's macOS originally released in 2006 by Austin Sarner and Brian Ball. It is a utility designed to clean up and uninstall applications along with all of their associated support files.

While standard macOS uninstallation involves dragging an application to the trash, AppZapper enhances this process by automatically locating related files scattered across system directories—such as preference files, caches, and support libraries—allowing users to delete them simultaneously.

== AppZapper 3000 ==
In 2026, the developers released AppZapper 3000, a completely rebuilt and modernized version tailored for recent macOS releases (requiring macOS 15 or later). This updated version introduces a redesigned user experience featuring 3D laser zapping animations, customizable blaster themes, and a "Zap All" feature to automate complete uninstalls.

== Reception and legacy ==
AppZapper operates on a shareware model, allowing a limited number of free zaps before requiring a license purchase for continued use.
