= Veronica de la Cruz =

American journalist

Veronica De La Cruz
- Born: California
- Occupations: News anchor, philanthropist
- Children: 1

Veronica de la Cruz is an American television news anchor and philanthropist.

Since 2021, she has been a national anchor for Scripps News. She previously worked for KPIX-TV/KBCW in the San Francisco Bay Area as a news anchor, NBC News and CNN. In memory of her late brother, she formed the Eric de la Cruz Hope For Hearts Foundation in order to provide assistance to heart transplant patients.

== Early life and education ==
Veronica de la Cruz was born in the Central Valley of California. She is half Filipino-Chinese and half French-German Jewish.

Veronica moved to the Los Angeles area to attend college.

In her formative years, she was a competitive figure skater.

== Career ==
Early in her career, De la Cruz worked as an anchor and reporter at an NBC affiliate in Yuma, Arizona. She served as morning and mid-day anchor, and did live shots and produced packages for the 5 p.m. and 6 p.m. newscasts. During her time at KYMA-DT, De la Cruz covered numerous stories on Mexico–United States border issues, the nation's nursing shortage, and the plight of the migrant farm worker. During the 2002 Winter Olympics, she interviewed figure skating hopeful Sasha Cohen. De la Cruz also produced a series on the homeless before leaving the station, with whom she continues to do volunteer work periodically.

De la Cruz hosted a music show for SonicNet/Digital Planet, where she interviewed many different artists including: Hoobastank, Vertical Horizon, Eagle-Eye Cherry and The Roots. Her other work includes working as a host and reporter for Eruptor Entertainment's Living Giant, covering the international music scene. She reported from locales including Ibiza, Spain. De la Cruz also worked as a host and producer of the show Direct Drive on the Digital Entertainment Network.

De la Cruz joined CNN in 2003 and in 2007, moved from the network's world headquarters in Atlanta to the New York City offices. She anchored live coverage of major breaking stories including the death and state funeral of former President of the United States Ronald Reagan, the 2004 Indian Ocean earthquake and tsunami, the Hezbollah-Israeli conflict and Hurricane Katrina. De la Cruz formerly appeared on CNN's Emmy-nominated morning show, American Morning, from 6 a.m. to 9 a.m. Eastern time zone, providing Dotcom Desk information to CNN's early morning viewers. She became a contributor to their domestic network with the segment "Dotcom Desk", which launched during the 2004 Indian Ocean earthquake and tsunami. She also substituted as a replacement anchor for CNN U.S. and HLN, formerly CNN Headline News. De la Cruz previously anchored the CNN broadband news service, CNN Pipeline, now CNN.com Live, and was one of its four founding anchors. Her contributions to CNN's news coverage include reporting on Hurricane Katrina, working with the victims and relief desk, and numerous on-line reports with CNN broadband news.

During the 2008 Consumer Electronics Show in Las Vegas, De la Cruz interviewed keynote speaker Bill Gates of Microsoft shortly before his retirement. In June 2008, she flew to Northern California to work with the Sacramento, California police vice squad as they tried to crack down on minors selling themselves through Craigslist. At that time, she asked Jim Buckmaster, CEO of Craigslist, why the website continued to advertise erotic services on their site. In November, Craigslist announced they would try to fix the problem by charging for the ads. De la Cruz, whose mother is of Asian descent, has done many reports on Asian Americans. Among them were growing up Asian in America, human trafficking, and the significance of the Asian American vote in the 2008 United States presidential edition.

De la Cruz left CNN in 2008 and joined NBC/MSNBC. From 2010–2014, she was an alternating anchor on both Early Today on NBC and First Look on MSNBC, and served as a correspondent for NBC News. She also filled in as news anchor on Today.

De La Cruz is formerly the evening anchor at CBS San Francisco, anchoring the 6 p.m. news on KPIX-TV and hosting Bay Area Nightbeat on their sister station, KBCW, at 10pm.

De La Cruz was a host for the live stream of the first weekend of the Coachella Valley Music and Arts Festival on YouTube from April 15–17, 2022.

== Health care reform activism ==
In 2009, De la Cruz started a campaign to save the life of her brother, Eric de la Cruz. Eric needed a heart transplant but was refused due to poor health insurance. Veronica tried raising money through social media outlets such as Twitter and Facebook as well as web pages that were created for her family's cause. Nine Inch Nails front man Trent Reznor joined the cause and raised hundreds of thousands of dollars for Eric as well as bringing much needed attention to the fight for proper health insurance. Despite these efforts, Eric died in July 2009. On April 20, 2010, De la Cruz formed the Eric de la Cruz Hope for Hearts foundation to provide assistance to heart transplant patients.
