= Betty Nguyen =

American news anchor (born 1974)

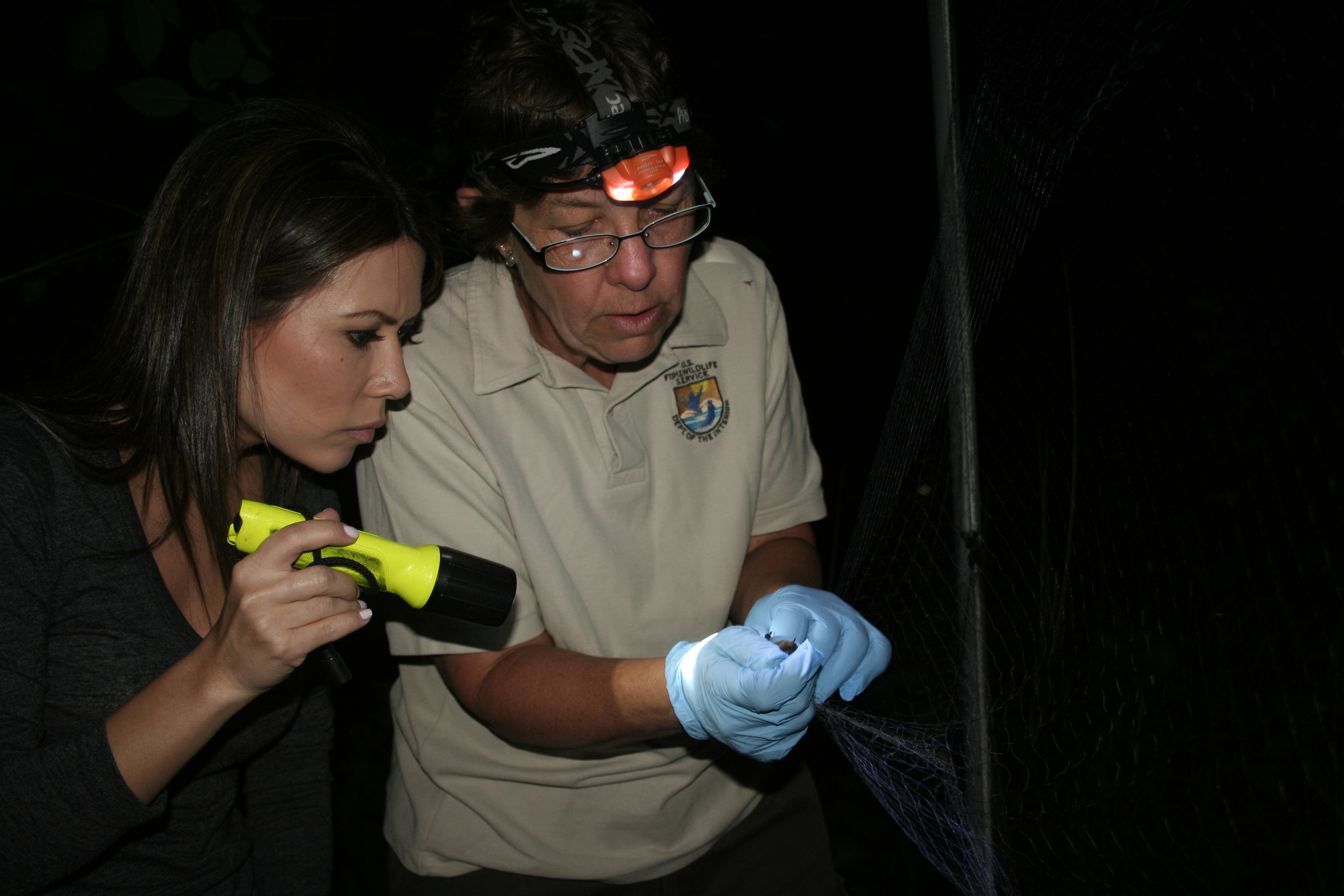
- Nguyen learning about endangered bat species
- Born: September 1, 1974 (age 52); Saigon, South Vietnam (now Ho Chi Minh City, Vietnam)
- Education: University of Texas at Austin
- Occupation: Broadcast journalist
- Years active: 1996–present
- Board member of: Help the Hungry, co-founder
- Children: 2
- Website: www.bettynguyen.org

Betty Nguyen (born September 1, 1974) is an American news anchor, currently CBS Miami morning news co-anchor. Nguyen has previously worked for NBC News, MSNBC, CBS News, CNN, and WPIX.

== Early life and education ==
Nguyen was born in Saigon, Vietnam. She is of Vietnamese and Scottish American descent. Nguyen and her family left Vietnam for the United States in April 1975 during the Fall of Saigon.

Nguyen grew up in Fort Worth, Texas, and attended the University of Texas at Austin. She was a cheerleader during her younger days and a member of the Zeta Tau Alpha sorority in college. She graduated magna cum laude with a bachelor's degree in broadcast journalism.

== Career ==
Nguyen began her career as a morning anchor and reporter at KWTX-TV, the CBS affiliate in Waco, Texas. Then, she was an anchor at KTVT-TV, the CBS affiliate in Fort Worth, where she covered numerous breaking news events, including the Columbia disaster.

Nguyen then joined CNN, where she anchored the weekend morning edition of CNN Newsroom. She spent six years at CNN covering major news events including the 2010 Haiti earthquake, presidential elections in Africa, Hurricane Katrina, and the death of Pope John Paul II. She also went on an undercover assignment in Myanmar.

Nguyen became a network anchor and correspondent for CBS News in 2010. She was news anchor for CBS This Morning Saturday, correspondent for The Early Show, and anchored the CBS Morning News. During her tenure, she was also a substitute anchor on the weekend edition of the CBS Evening News and a Special Correspondent for Entertainment Tonight.

Nguyen joined NBC in 2013. She anchored Early Today on NBC and later, Morning Joe First Look on MSNBC. She was also a correspondent for the Today Show.

Nguyen was recognized by the Smithsonian Institution in 2007 as the first Vietnamese-American to anchor a national television news broadcast in the United States. According to Maxim, she was named one of "TV´s 10 Hottest News Anchors" in 2008. In 2011, she was listed as one of "The 10 Most Stylish Anchors & Reporters" by The Huffington Post. Nguyen spent a short time as a freelance correspondent for E! Entertainment Network. She has hosted several specials and was featured as a reporter on episodes of Walker, Texas Ranger. She can also be seen in Spike Lee's When the Levees Broke: A Requiem in Four Acts.

Nguyen became the new co-anchor of the PIX11 Morning News at WPIX-TV on June 19, 2017, succeeding Sukanya Krishnan. She left the station in 2021.

On February 17, 2023, Nguyen was named morning news co-anchor at WFOR-TV in Miami. Nguyen will join co-anchor Keith Jones, meteorologist Lissette Gonzalez and breaking news and traffic anchor Austin Carter from 4:30 a.m. to 7 a.m. starting March 13.

== Personal life ==
In July 2015, Nguyen announced she was pregnant with her first child. She gave birth to a son, Thomas, on December 15, 2015. She also mentioned that she had previously suffered a miscarriage. Her second son, Christopher, was born July 10, 2018.

== Board membership and affiliations ==
- Co-founder of Help the Hungry
- Member of the Asian American Journalists Association

== Awards ==
- 2003 Regional Emmy award for "Outstanding Noon Newscast"
- 2003 Great Women of Texas: Women of Influence Honoree
- 2003 Legacy of Women Award

== See also ==
- New Yorkers in journalism
