= Mara Schiavocampo =

American journalist

Mara S. Campo
- Born: Mara Schiavocampo; September 28, 1979 (age 45); Silver Spring, Maryland, U.S.
- Education: University of California, Los Angeles; University of Maryland, College Park
- Occupation(s): Journalist, News Anchor
- Spouse: Tommie Porter (m. 2005)
- Children: 2

Mara Schiavocampo (/skiːɑːvoʊˈkɑːmpoʊ/ skee-ah-voh-KAHM-poh), also known as Mara S. Campo, (born September 28, 1979) is a four-time Emmy Award-winning journalist, podcast host, and Executive Producer. Schiavocampo is the host of TV One's investigative show "Fatal Attraction: Last Words". She is also the anchor of Revolt TV's special reports and investigations. Schiavocampo frequently appears on cable news as a commentator and analyst, focusing mainly on issues of race and culture.

Schiavocampo is one of the highest charting Black podcasters in the country. She was the Executive Producer and Host of the wellness and beauty podcast "The Trend Reporter" (iHeart Media), which twice reached #1 on the iTunes Fashion and Beauty charts. The podcast ran for two seasons. Schiavocampo is also the creator, Executive producer, and co-host of the podcast "Run Tell This", which features prominent Black journalists discussing news and current events.

Schiavocampo spent 11 years in network television as a correspondent and anchor. Schiavocampo worked as a correspondent for "Good Morning America" and ABC News from 2014 to 2018. Before that, she was a correspondent and anchor for NBC News. She was an anchor for Early Today on NBC and for First Look on MSNBC and was an NBC News correspondent.

Schiavocampo was a pioneer of digital journalism and the first digital correspondent in network news.

== Biography ==
Schiavocampo received her undergraduate degree from University of California, Los Angeles and her master's degree from University of Maryland, College Park.

Schiavocampo has worked for ABC News, CBS News, Current TV, Yahoo!, NPR, Ebony Magazine, The Oprah Winfrey Show, The Dr. Oz Show, and Uptown. Schiavocampo was with NBC News from 2007 to 2013, where she was a digital correspondent and anchor of Early Today and anchor of MSNBC's First Look for her last three years with NBC.

Schiavocampo is married to Tommie Porter; the couple has two children. The family lives in Harlem, New York.

Schiavocampo is biracial, born of a Sicilian Italian father and an African-American mother.
