= Dan Kloeffler =

American television journalist (born 1976)

- Born: Daniel L. Kloeffler; January 1, 1976 (age 50); Algonac, Michigan, U.S.
- Education: University of New Hampshire
- Occupations: Television journalist, media consultant
- Years active: 2000s–present
- Employer: ABC (2010–2016)
- Known for: Anchor of World News Now; co‑anchor of ABC News Live
- Website: www.dankloeffler.com

Daniel L. Kloeffler (born January 1, 1976) is an American media consultant and television journalist. In 2010, he became anchor of ABC News Live, a cable-news channel of the ABC broadcasting network. He also founded The Salt Standard.

== Early life and education ==
Kloeffler grew up in Algonac, Michigan, where he attended local schools. He graduated from the University of New Hampshire in Durham, New Hampshire, in 1999.

== Career ==
He worked at WSTM-TV – an NBC-affiliated television station in Syracuse, New York – prior to joining MSNBC, a cable-news channel. While at MSNBC, he anchored overnight MSNBC news updates as well as MSNBC's First Look and broadcast network NBC's Early Today, both early-morning news programs; Kloeffler left MSNBC in 2009. In 2010, Kloeffler became a freelance anchor and correspondent for ABC News, and has been identified as one of the anchors of the division's digital service ABC News Live.

In October 2011, while co‑anchoring ABC's World News Now, he came out on air in a casual remark following a report about actor Zachary Quinto, saying, "He's 34, I'm 35. I'm thinking, I can lose my distraction about dating actors." His disclosure was noted as part of a broader trend of openly gay journalists in national television news. Later his on‑air disclosure was mentioned by The New York Times as part of a broader discussion of television journalists who made their sexual orientation public in a low‑key manner.

In November 2012, Kloeffler contributed to ABC News' Your Voice, Your Vote election coverage, providing updates via Google+ Hangouts across all 50 states. In February 2013, Kloeffler reported for ABC News on the papacy, presenting statistical information about the Catholic Church and the College of Cardinals ahead of the election of Pope Benedict XVI's successor.

In January 2014, Kloeffler interviewed Olympic gold medalist Brian Boitano for ABC News about his decision to come out as gay ahead of the Sochi Winter Games. In February 2015, Kloeffler reported for ABC News on celebrity reactions to the Super Bowl as part of the network's "Pop News" coverage.

In August 2016, Kloeffler covered Britney Spears' announcement of her ninth studio album Glory for ABC News during the network's "Pop News" segment.

== Bibliography ==
In 2017, Kloeffler's 2013 ABC News report appears in the Carnegie Endowment volume Understanding Cyber Conflict: Fourteen Analogies ISBN 9781626164970.

== Personal life ==
Kloeffler came out as gay live during a broadcast on October 17th, 2011.
