= Jonathan Lemire =

American journalist (born 1979)

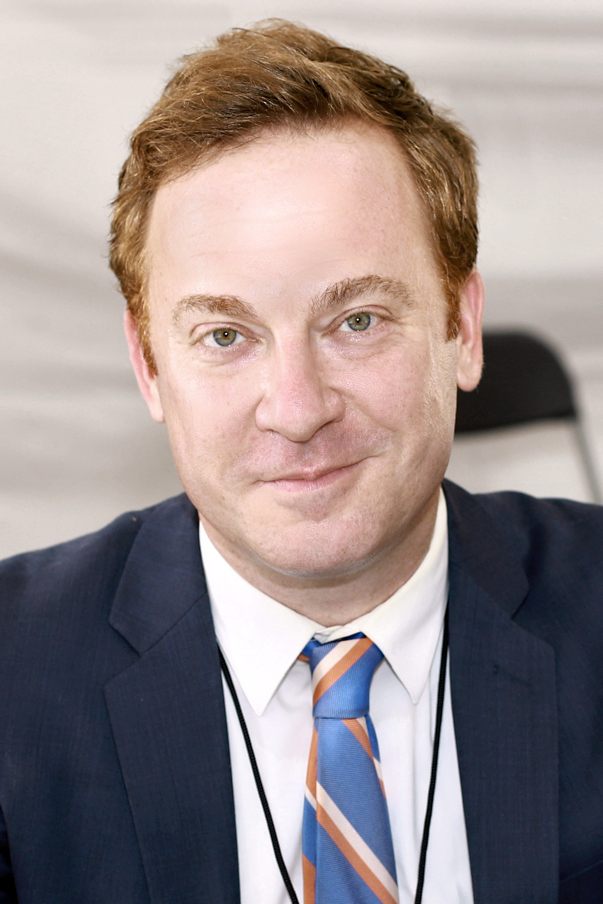
- Jonathan Lemire
- Born: November 28, 1979 (age 46); Lowell, Massachusetts, U.S.
- Education: Central Catholic High School
- Alma mater: Columbia University (BA)
- Occupations: Co-anchor, Morning Joe; Staff Writer, The Atlantic
- Notable credit(s): MS NOW; The Atlantic; Associated Press; Politico
- Spouse: Carrie Melago
- Children: 2

Jonathan Lemire (born November 28, 1979) is an American political correspondent. He is currently co-host of Morning Joe on MS NOW and a staff writer at The Atlantic. He was formerly the White House bureau chief at Politico and a White House correspondent at The Associated Press. He was previously the host of MSNBC's morning news show Way Too Early from 2021 through 2024.

== Early life and education ==
Lemire grew up in the Pawtucketville neighborhood of Lowell, Massachusetts, the son of Susan (née O'Brien) and Robert C. Lemire Jr. His mother worked for the University of Massachusetts Lowell and his father was a high school teacher. He graduated from Central Catholic High School in Lawrence, Massachusetts, where he was a record-setting runner for the school's track and field team, and earned a bachelor's degree in history from Columbia University in 2001.

== Career ==
At Columbia, he wrote for the student newspaper, Columbia Daily Spectator, and later interned at the New York Daily News in 2001. Lemire said, "I was told that I would never be hired but I could stay on as an intern for another few months." A week later, the terrorist attacks of September 11, 2001 occurred, and Lemire "was eventually brought on staff." Lemire worked there for more than a decade.

In 2013, Lemire joined the Associated Press, where he covered New York City politics as well as Donald Trump's and Joe Biden's administrations. He gained media attention for his news conference question to Trump about Russia's Vladimir Putin at their July 2018 Helsinki summit, "Who do you believe, Putin or U.S. intelligence?" Lemire has also been a longtime political analyst for MSNBC and NBC News.

In October 2021, MSNBC named Lemire as the new host of its early morning news show Way Too Early, taking over full-time reporting duties from Kasie Hunt. He remained there until December 2024 before being promoted to co-host of Morning Joe . He joined The Atlantic as a contributing writer in January 2025 before being elevated to staff writer that August. Previously, he was also White House bureau chief of Politico, beginning his duties there in November 2021.

== Personal life ==
In 2008, Lemire married fellow journalist Carrie Melago, who is a managing editor of Chalkbeat. They met while they were both working at The New York Daily News. The couple has two children. He is also a diehard Boston sports fan.

== Works ==
- The Big Lie: Election Chaos, Political Opportunism, and the State of American Politics After 2020. Flatiron Books. July 26, 2022. ISBN 978-1-250-81963-5.
