= NBC Weather Plus =

American broadcast network

- Type: Defunct Digital broadcast television network (weather/meteorology)
- Country: United States

Programming
- Picture format: 480i (SDTV)

Ownership
- Owner: NBCUniversal and NBC affiliates (exact share unknown)

History
- Launched: November 15, 2004
- Closed: December 31, 2008 (national network); 2009–2015 (local stations)

NBC Weather Plus was an American weather-oriented digital multicast television network owned as a joint venture between NBCUniversal and the local affiliates of the NBC television network. The service, which was broadcast in standard definition, was carried on the digital subchannels of many NBC affiliates and on the digital tiers of cable providers (through a local affiliate).

== Overview ==
NBC Weather Plus primarily competed with cable network The Weather Channel, as well as a similar digital multicast network, The Local AccuWeather Channel.

The network also provided content for both NBC News and MSNBC's programming; Weather Plus staff also appeared on most of the networks’ programs (although Today mainly used certain meteorologists from the network as substitutes for the program's separate weather anchors). In 2006, after MSNBC moved its operations to 30 Rockefeller Plaza in New York City's Midtown Manhattan district (integrating its operations with NBC News), Weather Plus moved into fellow sister network CNBC's Global Headquarters in Englewood Cliffs, New Jersey.

In addition to the network, Weather Plus staff provided weather updates for CNBC and MSNBC; MSNBC also aired "sample" hours of the network during the morning hours on certain major holidays. In addition, Weather Plus was promoted during NBC's NFL pre-game show Football Night in America, and was used to provide the temperature and weather conditions at gametime for each week's NBC Sunday Night Football game during the NFL season. During significant national weather events (such as a major winter storm), Weather Plus meteorologists conducted live reports for NBC Nightly News to provide analysis (all of these services are now provided by The Weather Channel).

== History ==
NBC Weather Plus was unveiled at the NBC affiliate meeting in 2004. The network debuted on November 15, 2004, with NBC's New York City owned-and-operated station WNBC serving as the test station. At the time, the network was operating out of the offices of NBC News' affiliate newsgathering service, NBC News Channel, in Charlotte, North Carolina. NBC and MSNBC weather anchors and meteorologist staff the network to start. Raycom Media agreed by April 2005 to affiliated its 13 NBC stations' subchannel with NBC Weather Plus,

On March 30, 2005, Sunbeam Television, Liberty Corporation, Sunbelt Communications and Bonneville International announced that 30 stations of their station would launch the network bring coverage up to 67% of U.S. households. Weather Plus was moved to NBC News division in 2007 after NBC Station Group President Jay Ireland returned to General Electric. However, by September 2005, KAMR-TV in Amarillo, Texas and KHAS-TV (now KNHL) in Lincoln/Hastings/Kearney, Nebraska became the only NBC affiliates owned by Nexstar Broadcasting Group (now Nexstar Media Group) and Hoak Media to have picked up the NBC Weather Plus service on their digital subchannels.

=== Closure ===
Former logo for NBC Plus.

In September 2008, Landmark Media Enterprises sold The Weather Channel to a consortium of NBC Universal, and private equity firms Blackstone Group and Bain Capital. Shortly afterward, on October 7, NBC Universal announced that it would phase out Weather Plus by New Year's Eve of that year, after the NBC affiliates expressed a desire to shut the service down. Though NBC cited its purchase of The Weather Channel as a factor in the shutdown, it was stated that the network's closure would have occurred even if the acquisition had not happened.

Segments featuring on-camera personalities were discontinued on October 24, 2008. Afterwards until the network formally ceased operations, it ran only a loop of various national satellite, radar and temperature maps accompanied by music, local weather maps inserted by the network's affiliates, and Weather Plus University. With this, the remaining on-camera meteorologists from Weather Plus were referred to on other NBC News and MSNBC programs as only "NBC meteorologists," before eventually being mentioned as being part of the Weather Channel's staff. The Weather Channel's main Atlanta staff also began appearing on NBC News programs, either from the cable channel's Atlanta headquarters, NBC's New York City operations or via satellite on-location during weather events. In early December 2008, the website of Weather Plus was redirected to The Weather Channel's website.

The service formally shut down operations on December 31, 2008. While some of its affiliates switched to other networks, the remaining affiliates running them as local weather services. Many operated under the unofficial brand, "NBC Plus". This option allowed the equipment that had been used to insert local content onto the former national feed of NBC Weather Plus to remain in use. The network's forecast system and maps continued to be used until 2010 for studio segments on CNBC and MSNBC, with Weather Channel branding along the top-third banner, before being replaced entirely with graphics used by The Weather Channel by mid-2010 (the graphics system used for Weather Plus's national feed remains in use on NBC's Early Today as of 2014).

Until 2011, several NBC owned-and-operated stations ran a barebones variant of Weather Plus, which was finally replaced with a localized news and lifestyle service called NBC Nonstop (which was replaced by Cozi TV in 2012). Other stations have discontinued their use of Weather Plus in order to take advantage of upgraded weather technology after converting to high-definition news production, or switched to an entertainment-based multicast network featuring programming more palatable to different advertisers. WVIR-TV kept the Weather Plus look until reportedly May 2015 when it was replaced by WeatherNation.

== Programming ==
=== National programming ===
From its launch until the network discontinued on-camera segments in October 2008, NBC Weather Plus maintained a wheel format for its forecast segments, which were scheduled at fixed timeslots each half-hour:

Timeslot	Segment	Description
Top of hour-:04 past the half-hour	Local Forecast	Weather inserts from the local Weather Plus affiliate
:04-:06 past the half-hour	Coast To Coast	Regional forecasts for the Northeastern, Midwestern, Southeastern, Southwestern and Northwestern United States
:07.30-:09.30 past the half-hour	Local Forecast	Weather inserts from the local Weather Plus affiliate
:09.30-:13.30 past the half-hour	Seasonal Weather Outlook	A summary of ongoing or forecasted severe weather; the segment focused primarily on summer weather from May to October and winter weather from November to April
:15-:19 past the half-hour	Local Forecast	Weather inserts from the local Weather Plus affiliate
:19-:21 past the half-hour	Plus Five Forecast	Five-day national weather and temperature forecast
:22.30-:24.30 past the half-hour	Local Forecast	Weather inserts from the local Weather Plus affiliate
:24.30-:28.30 past the half-hour	Weather News	A selected weather- or climate-related news report from NBC News or an NBC-affiliated station

NBC Weather Plus' programming is mostly recorded; outside of at least one live update hourly between 4:00 a.m. and 11:00 p.m. local time provided by the affiliates, a digital video jukebox system is used to shuffle certain segments (particularly during seasonal outlook and weather news segments as well as the network's late night programming), except in the event of severe weather of particular significance ongoing in the U.S. A viewer that watched NBC Weather Plus in any given day would be able to see a weather news segment that originally aired in the morning repeated long into the night, the same weather information that aired at 11:00 p.m. airing at 4:00 a.m., and the same seasonal outlook (severe weather, tropical weather, or winter weather) segment that originally aired in the morning repeating long into the late afternoon. In the latter instance, this was an issue as updated information may not have been available during any type of severe weather (unless very significant) that was ongoing.

Some of the segments featured on the network used different titles at times if it is a sponsored forecast segment such as State Farm Road Coverage, which replaced Coast To Coast. The network also produced Weather Plus University, a half-hour program focusing on educating viewers about weather, and featured segments from NBC News and NBC affiliates relating to climate. That program was part of the network's FCC-required E/I programming.

During severe weather events, national segments, at the affiliates' discretion, could be replaced with either news simulcasts or a constant radar display; in turn, this coverage could be picked up by the national Weather Plus feed (live if possible) during the "Coast To Coast" and/or "Plus Five Forecast" segments. During the network's "Weather Alert" mode, specifically when a major severe weather event was occurring or a dangerous hurricane is preparing to make landfall, regular programming was interrupted to provide constant coverage. Most of NBC Weather Plus' affiliates used a respective combination of the station and "Weather Plus" branding, for both the subchannel and for the station's general weather branding during newscasts and weather updates on the NBC affiliate's main channel. After the shutdown of the digital network, many NBC affiliates continued to use the "Weather Plus" brand as part of their on-air weather branding, although most have switched to other brands in the succeeding years.

=== Local forecasts ===
NBC Weather Plus gave 24 minutes of programming time per hour to its affiliates to air pre-recorded local forecast segments conducted by weather staff from local NBC-affiliated stations, running eight times an hour. In addition, current weather conditions for a given area and surrounding areas within the affiliate's viewing area or state; regional and five-day forecasts; and almanacs (featuring the day's observed high and low temperatures) were also provided during the local segments.

Local version of NBC Weather Plus from Milwaukee's WTMJ-TV, showing an ad in the top-left corner, local branding above the Weather Plus logo, and time in the bottom-left.

The forecast segment seen in place of the local forecasts on the national feed (which was streamed on the network's website where a local Weather Plus feed was not available for streaming, and was not carried on satellite via DirecTV, Dish Network or C band services) cycled through daily forecasts and composite satellite/radar loops for the respective regions of the Northeastern, Southeastern, Midwestern, Northwestern and Southwestern United States. Music associated with the local forecast segments came from commercial sources, including 615 Music, which composed the music package (mostly the tracks from Positive Pop Grooves, with the other tracks being DJ Gruv, Voccho, Sneez and Pyraflex) used by NBC Weather Plus' weather radar forecasts from 2005 to 2008.

=== The "L" bar ===
The network utilizes an on-screen graphic, known as the "L-bar," to display local weather forecasts on the left and bottom third of the screen to provide local weather information on a continuous basis, even during commercial breaks, national weather segments and Weather Plus University. The sidebar displayed sponsorship tags on the top left (which were more often seen on local feeds, and was removed during Weather Plus University), current weather conditions (sky condition, temperature, wind speed/direction and humidity) for the affiliate's city of service and other cities within the viewing area or state on the middle left; station identification on the bottom left (in which affiliates augmented their logo above the Weather Plus logo); and the current time and on some stations, perpetual station identification text on the lower left. The bottom right two-thirds of the bar displayed 24-hour and five-day forecasts for each city (with the 24-hour forecasts also incorporating forecasted precipitation amounts).

A planned revamp of Weather Plus prior to the shutdown announcement (from KOMU-TV).

Similar to The Weather Channel's Local on the 8s segment in the hour after sunset (which determined the usage of daypart-based icons partly on the time of sunset in a given locality), an occasional bug in the "L-bar" displayed weather icons incorporating the sun when detailing the current sky condition for some observation sites at night. If an observation site was located within or near a larger city, the forecast for the next closest reporting station would be shown instead (for example, on Dallas affiliate KXAS-TV's Weather Plus subchannel, the current conditions for Fort Worth Alliance Airport were displayed alongside the forecast for nearby Dallas). The current conditions for a single city cycled for 20 seconds; while the 24-hour and five-day forecasts cycled for 10 seconds. In the case of Sacramento affiliate KCRA, the current conditions cycled continuously and the current time was placed on the right-hand side in the lower-right third. The national feed featured a different "L-bar," which cycled through current conditions, 24-hour and five-day forecasts for 50 major U.S. cities.

Prior to the announcement of Weather Plus' shutdown, the network had planned to revamp the "L-bar". The redesigned graphic was adopted by at least one former Weather Plus affiliate, WKYC-TV in Cleveland, Ohio, following the closure of Weather Plus when it reformatted its weather subchannel into a local format, before the station converted the subchannel into a local radar loop, and later True Crime Network.

== Notable former on-air staff ==
- Bill Karins (now chief meteorologist for NBC News)
- Sean McLaughlin (now at KPHO-TV in Phoenix)
- Byron Miranda (now weather anchor at WPIX in New York City)
- Raphael Miranda (now at WNBC in New York City)
- Jim Nichols (now at WBAL-TV in Baltimore)
- Jeff Ranieri (now at KNTV in San Francisco)

== See also ==
- Fox Weather
- The Weather Channel
