= IObit Malware Fighter =

Anti-malware software

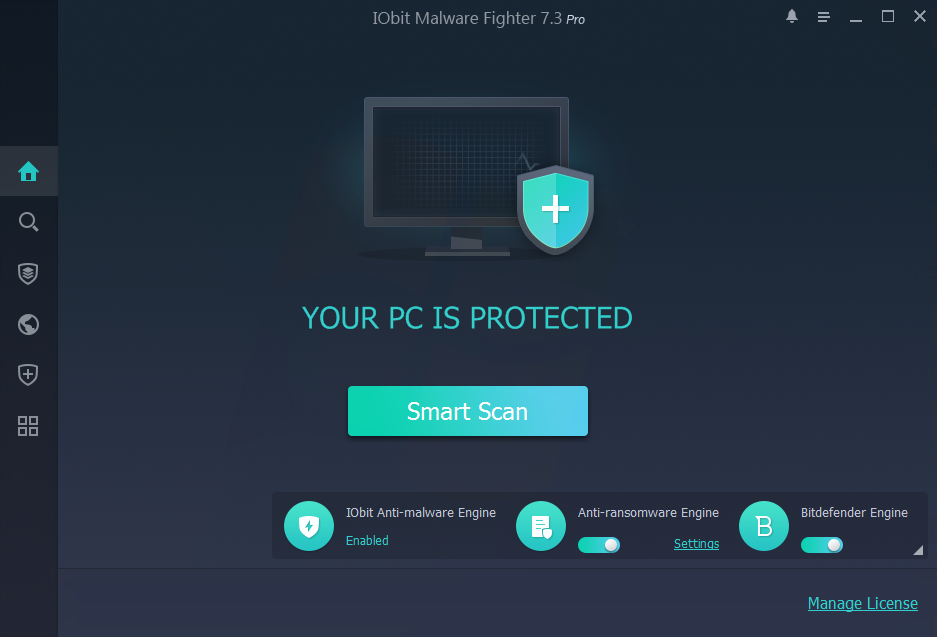
- Developer(s): IObit
- Stable release: 9.3 / September 5, 2022; 2 years ago
- Operating system: Microsoft Windows
- Size: 39.2 MB
- Available in: 34 languages
- List of languages Arabic, Bulgarian, Chinese (Simplified), Chinese (Traditional), Czech, Danish, Dutch, English, Finnish, Flemish, French, German, Greek, Hebrew, Hungarian, Italian, Japanese, Korean, Malay, Norwegian, Polish, Portuguese (Brazil), Portuguese (Portugal), Romanian, Russian, Serbian (Cyrillic), Serbian (Latin), Slovak, Slovenian, Spanish, Swedish, Turkish, Ukrainian and Vietnamese
- Type: Anti-malware
- License: Proprietary software Free edition: Freeware; personal use only Pro edition: Annual Subscription
- Website: iobit.com

IObit Malware Fighter is an anti-malware and anti-virus program for the Microsoft Windows operating system (Windows XP and later). It is designed to remove and protect against malware, including, but not limited to Trojans, rootkits, and ransomware.

== Overview ==
IObit Malware Fighter has a freeware version, which can run alongside the user's existing anti-virus solution. In the paid edition, the product comes with anti-virus protection. As of version 6, released in 2018, the product includes the Bitdefender engine in its commercial version, along with its anti-malware engine. New features of the latest release includes an improved user interface called "Safe Box" created to protect specific folders from unauthorized access, and "MBR Guard" which protects the user's system from malicious attacks such as Petya and cryptocurrency mining scripts.

== Releases ==
- In 2010, the first beta for IObit Malware Fighter 1.0 was released to the public.
- In 2013, IObit Malware Fighter 2 was released. In this version, IObit debuted its "cloud security" component, in which the user can upload a file to the cloud to determine whether it is malicious or not. In 2015, version 3 was released, and then, in 2016, version 4, which added the Bitdefender anti-virus engine in its commercial edition.
- In 2017, version 5 was released. Among new features was an anti-ransomware component. Version 6 was released in May 2018.
- In 2018, version 6 was released. It added new features, including Safe Box, and MBR Guard.

== Reception ==
- In November 2011, the free and paid versions of IObit Malware Fighter were reviewed by Bright Hub, in which the reviewer was unable to recommend the product, citing poor malware protection.
- In May 2013, IObit Malware Fighter received a "dismal" score, half a star out of five, for its paid version by PC Magazine.
- In December 2013, the paid version of IObit Malware Fighter received a 1 out of 5-star rating from Softpedia.
- In March 2015, the commercial version of IObit Malware Fighter 3 received a negative review from PC Magazine, with the reviewer calling the product "useless".
- IObit Malware Fighter received a 4 out of 5-star editors rating on CNET's Download.com.
- In May 2017, PC Magazine gave the paid version of IObit Malware Fighter a 2 out of 5-star rating.
- In July 2017, TechRadar gave the IObit Malware Fighter paid version a two-and-a-half star rating, in which the reviewer complained about the product's overall protection against malware.
- In May 2018, IObit Malware Fighter 6 received a negative review from the ReviewedByPro.com website with the reviewer stating that the software "is not capable on protecting the entire family, or heavy internet users as the defenses are not very reliable and security features do not work well".

== See also ==
- IObit Uninstaller
