= Kasie Hunt =

American journalist and news anchor (born 1985)

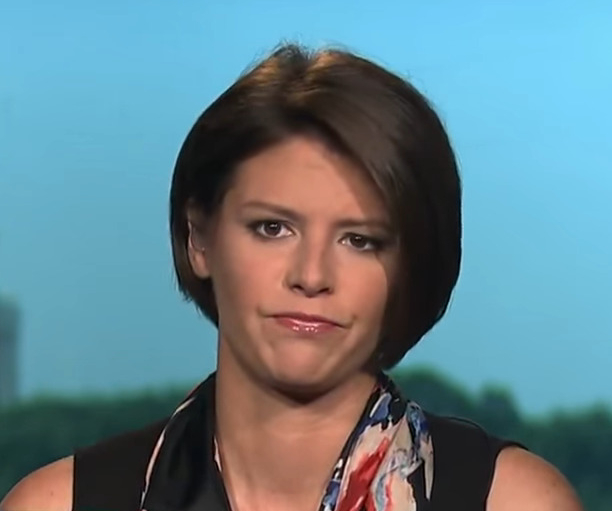
- Hunt in July 2017
- Born: Kasie Sue Hunt; May 24, 1985 (age 41); Dearborn, Michigan, U.S.
- Education: Conestoga High School
- Alma mater: The George Washington University (BA); St John's College, Cambridge (MA)
- Occupations: Political reporter and anchor for CNN
- Years active: 2007–present
- Spouse: Matt Rivera (m. 2017)
- Children: 2

Kasie Sue Hunt (born May 24, 1985) is an American political correspondent for CNN and host of The Arena with Kasie Hunt. From 2013 to 2021, she was NBC News' Capitol Hill correspondent, covering Congress across all NBC News and MSNBC platforms and was the host of MSNBC's Way Too Early with Kasie Hunt and Kasie DC. From 2024 to 2025, Hunt also hosted CNN This Morning with Kasie Hunt.

== Early life and education ==
Hunt was born in Dearborn, Michigan and was raised in Wayne, Pennsylvania. She’s the daughter of Bruce and Krista Hunt and has a younger sister named Carly Hunt. Her father manages real estate design and construction for Penn Medicine, University of Pennsylvania Health System in Philadelphia, while her mother is a yoga teacher in Easton. Her sister is a former golfer for both the Georgetown Hoyas and Maryland Terrapins women's golf teams.

Hunt graduated from Conestoga High School in 2003. She attended George Washington University and graduated magna cum laude with a degree in international affairs in 2006. She went on to earn her master's degree in sociology from St John's College, Cambridge, UK.

== Career ==
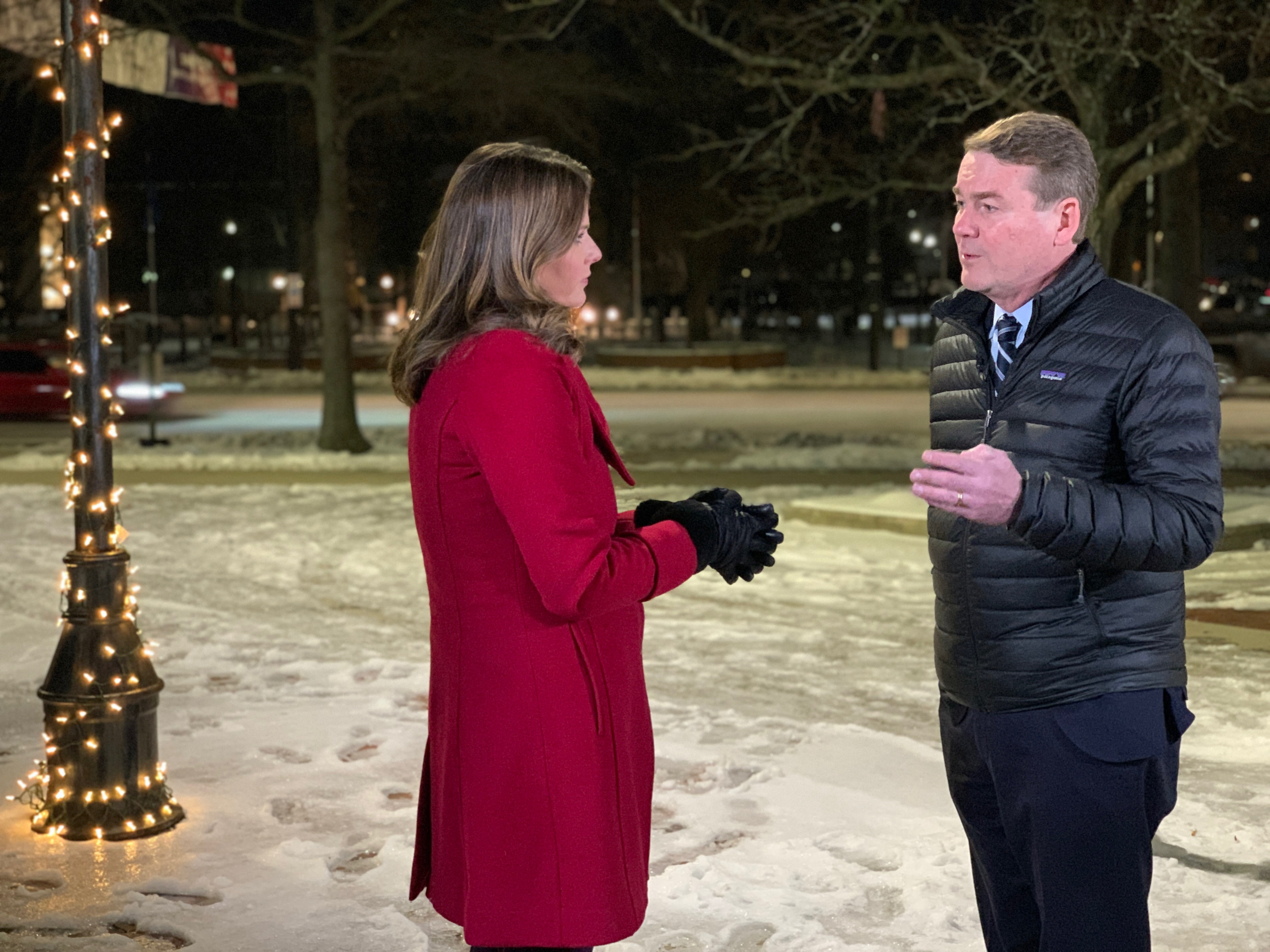
Hunt interviewing Michael Bennet in 2020 for Kasie DC

Hunt started her career in journalism as an intern in the political unit of NBC News. She was a health policy reporter for the National Journal's CongressDaily, writing about the passage of the Affordable Care Act. She wrote for Politico, covering the 2010 midterm elections. She started working as a national political reporter for the Associated Press in August 2011 and covered Mitt Romney's 2012 presidential campaign.

In January 2013, Hunt joined NBC News as an off-air reporter and producer covering Congress and politics. She started appearing regularly on MSNBC as a political reporter and in November 2014 became a political correspondent. She wrote for MSNBC.com and appeared regularly on MSNBC and Bloomberg shows, including Morning Joe, MTP Daily, Hardball with Chris Matthews, and With All Due Respect.

In October 2017, Hunt began anchoring a weekend show on MSNBC, Kasie DC, which aired on Sundays at 7 p.m. and 8 p.m. ET In November 2017, Hunt stated that an attack on senator Rand Paul by his neighbor was her 'favorite story'. Paul's wife criticized the comment and Hunt later apologized. On September 10, 2020, it was announced that Kasie DC would end on September 13, and that Hunt would move to a revived version of MSNBC's early-morning show Way Too Early beginning September 21.

On July 16, 2021, Hunt announced her departure from NBC News and MSNBC, with CNN subsequently hiring her for its upcoming streaming service CNN+. Hunt's new program, The Source with Kasie Hunt, premiered on CNN+ on March 29, 2022. After the closure of CNN+ the following month, Hunt largely served as a contributor and fill-in anchor.

In August 2023, CNN announced that Hunt would become the new anchor of its own early-morning show Early Start (later renamed CNN This Morning with Kasie Hunt in February 2024). In September 2023, Hunt also began hosting the daily political program State of the Race for CNN International.

On January 23, 2025, CNN announced that Hunt would move to a new one hour afternoon show, The Arena with Kasie Hunt, which premiered on March 3, 2025.

== Personal life ==
Kasie Hunt married NBC News producer Matt Rivera on May 6, 2017. In September 2019, she gave birth to her first child, a boy. In March 2023, she gave birth to her second child, a girl.

In October 2021, Hunt underwent a four-hour surgery for the successful removal of a benign brain tumor.
