= Malwarebytes =

Internet security company

Malwarebytes Inc.

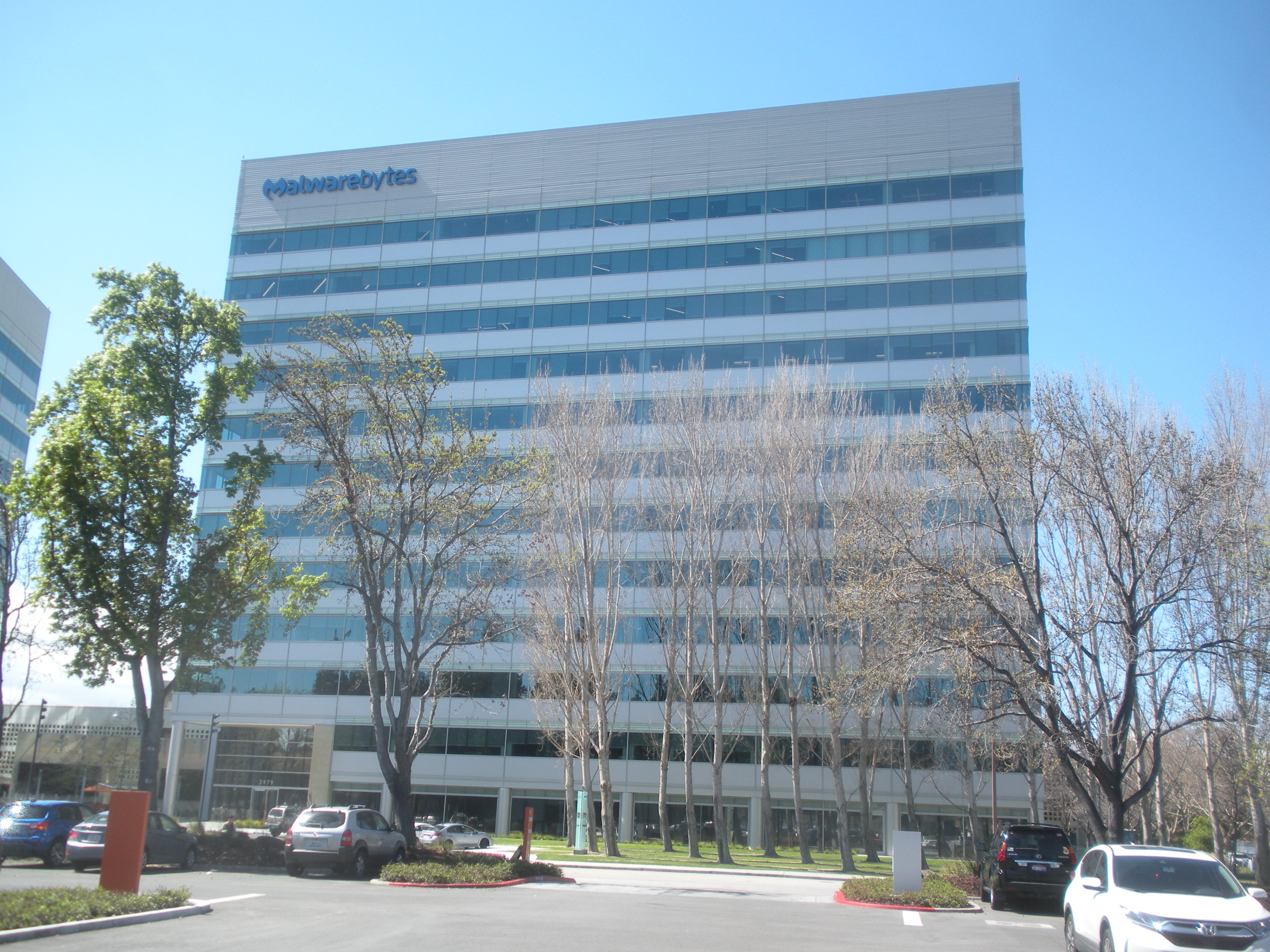
- Malwarebytes headquarters in Santa Clara
- Type: Private
- Industry: Computer software; Security software
- Founded: January 21, 2008; 18 years ago; Illinois, U.S.
- Founder: Marcin Kleczynski; Bruce Harrison
- Headquarters: Santa Clara, California, U.S.; Cork, Ireland (EMEA)
- Area served: Worldwide
- Key people: Marcin Kleczynski CEO
- Products: Computer security software
- Number of employees: 866 (2023)
- Website: www.malwarebytes.com

Malwarebytes Inc. is an American cybersecurity company that develops software to protect computers and mobile devices from malicious software and other digital threats. It was founded in 2008 by Marcin Kleczynski, who is chief executive officer. The company is based in Santa Clara, California. Its consumer products also include tools intended to help users identify online scams.

In 2023, Malwarebytes separated its business security division under the new name ThreatDown, which continues to develop and maintain the company’s enterprise security products. In 2024, Malwarebytes acquired the Sweden-based virtual private network provider AzireVPN to expand its privacy-focused software portfolio.

== History ==
=== Early history ===
Malwarebytes traces its origins to 2004, when Polish-born programmer Marcin Kleczynski began developing malware-removal utilities while still in high school in Illinois and was working as a technician in a computer repair shop in Chicago. After encountering persistent infections while repairing computers, he created a tool named RogueRemover in 2006 to eliminate fake antivirus programs. RogueRemover proved instrumental in developing Malwarebytes Anti-Malware, and Kleczynski was able to set up a forum which enabled him to improve the software through feedback. Kleczynski and one of the site's regulars, Bruce Harrison, formally launched Malwarebytes on January 21, 2008, while Kleczynski was studying computer science at the University of Illinois. The company initially operated from Chicago before relocating to San Jose, California.

Harrison became the VP of Research for Malwarebytes, and further hired Doug Swanson, with experience in freeware development to work for the new company. Marcus Chung, an e-commerce expert who formerly worked for GreenBorder, was hired as chief operating officer. Kleczynski and Harrison reportedly made $600,000 in their first year of selling the software, despite not having met personally at the time.

=== Post-2010 developments ===
In 2012, Malwarebytes acquired HPhosts, a website blacklisting company, which tracks blacklisted websites and ad servers, a necessary development to protect against new internet protocol addresses and web servers which distribute malware, and advise internet service providers to shut down those with malicious activity. That year, the company had claimed to have removed over five billion pieces of Malware in three years. The following year, the company launched into the corporate market with an enterprise product aimed at desktop-based anti-malware detection and protection. In 2013, Malwarebytes acquired ZeroVulnerabilityLabs, Inc., a security research and development company founded by Pedro Bustamante, which protects software applications from "known and zero-day exploits used by exploit kits, web-based vulnerability exploits and other corporate-targeted attacks". It expanded its malware removal and protection to the Android platform with the launch of Malwarebytes Anti-Malware Mobile, and launched a USB-based product called Malwarebytes Techbench aimed at helping technicians remove malware.

By 2013, it claimed to have removed five billion malware threats from computers in its first five years. In 2014, Malwarebytes received $30 million in funding from Highland Capital Partners, and by the following year, announced it had treated 250 million computers worldwide, representing about 20–25% of working business computers.

In June 2015, the company announced that it was moving its headquarters from 10 Almaden Boulevard in San Jose, California to a new 52,000 square feet (4,800 m^{2}) office space on the two top floors of the 12-story 3979 Freedom Circle in Santa Clara, California. The company reported a growth of 10 million users in just one year, from 25 to 35 million active users, and an increase in revenue by 1653% in 2014. In 2015, Kleczynski was named one of Forbes Magazine's '30 Under 30'.

In January 2016, Malwarebytes unveiled advanced anti-ransomware package Endpoint Security, and announced that it had raised $50 million in investment from Fidelity Management and Research Company. Kleczynski stated that the funds would be used primarily for the company's hiring, product development and marketing assets. In June, Malwarebytes announced a strong growth in sales of over 75 percent in the first quarter of the year compared to 2015, with billings surpassing $100 million. The corporate subscription base for the company was reported to have grown by 90%. In October the company purchased AdwCleaner, a Windows program used to clean adware and Potentially Unwanted Programs (PUPs) from computers. In February 2017 the company acquired Saferbytes, an Italian security start-up specialized in anti-malware, anti-exploit, anti-rootkit, cloud AV, and sandbox technologies.

In November 2019, the company joined forces with NortonLifeLock and Kaspersky, along with the Electronic Frontier Foundation and non-profits including the National Network to End Domestic Violence and Operation Safe Escape to form the Coalition Against Stalkerware. The coalition seeks to inform, educate and combat the use of tracking apps without consent.

=== Post-2020 developments ===
In January 2021, Malwarebytes was targeted by the same nation-state actor implicated in the SolarWinds attack and suffered a limited access breach. Investigations confirmed that no products or services were compromised.

In February 2021, Malwarebytes published its 2021 State of Malware Report which shared cyberthreat research including 30 million examples of Mac malware and a 1,055% increase in spyware detections in 2020.

In the same year, Malwarebytes, in collaboration with Digitunity and the Cybercrime Support Network, produced a report The Demographics of Cybercrime. The study surveyed 5,000 people in the United States, the United Kingdom, and Germany. The results showed that certain demographic groups are more likely to encounter cybercrime, which is more widespread in nature, and also experience stronger emotional and financial consequences after such incidents. The company has continued to publish consumer research on online fraud. According to a company survey published in June 2026, most respondents said they found it difficult to distinguish a scam from legitimate content, and a still larger share said it was becoming harder to judge whether online content was genuinely produced by a person. A separate analysis of the company's own threat data, drawn from more than 20 categories of scam recorded between April and July 2026, reported that different types of scam tended to reach people through different channels and that the volume of scam text messages varied by time of day and day of the week.

In August 2022, the company laid off 125 employees. The company announced an additional 100 layoffs in August 2023, as part of plans to separate the company into two separate business units.

In November 2024, Malwarebytes acquired AzireVPN, a VPN service based in Sweden.

In January 2026, Malwarebytes introduced the Student Protection Program in the United States. The initiative provides university students, faculty, and staff with a 2-year subscription to Malwarebytes Premium Security, covering up to 3 devices per user. Malwarebytes stated that the program was launched in response to research indicating that younger users are increasingly affected by online fraud and malicious software.

== Services and products ==
Kleczynski has stated that Malwarebytes, first developed in 2008, has a competitive advantage over many other traditional antivirus programs, many of which were developed in the late 1990s, before the development of many later forms of malware. The New York Times has described Malwarebytes as a "hybrid of heuristics, behavior and a signature engine that is designed to detect and block malware that other vendors can't detect". According to Dean Takahashi of VentureBeat, Malwarebytes complements other antivirus software from vendors such as Symantec and McAfee, with the anti-malware working alongside other anti-virus software to attack the problem from "different directions", remarking that the software both removed infections from infected machines, whilst preventing others from becoming infected in the first place.

As in the early development days with RogueRemover, Malwarebytes continues to support community feedback on its products, and runs two sub-forums complementing the main forum, known as "False positives" and "Malware contribution", with the false positives being reported allowing the company to update its database within hours of posting, and the Malware contribution allowing for users to quickly report malware missed by the software.

=== Artificial intelligence ===
In February 2025, reviewers reported that the company’s Katana engine began using advanced AI and machine-learning techniques to detect unidentified malware families, providing proactive protection against emerging threats.

Later in 2025, Malwarebytes employed heuristic and machine-learning technologies to detect new and evolving malware, strengthening its behaviour-based protection across consumer products.

In February 2026, Malwarebytes launched an integration with ChatGPT that enables users to check potentially fraudulent messages, links, domains, and phone numbers directly within the ChatGPT interface.

The tool can be accessed through ChatGPT’s app directory or by entering the prompt "Malwarebytes, is this a scam?" followed by the content to be reviewed. It compares submitted information against Malwarebytes’ threat intelligence sources and reported scam databases, and provides contextual explanations where appropriate.

The integration is reported to be available to ChatGPT Free, Plus, Team, and Enterprise users.

In April 2026, Malwarebytes extended this approach to Anthropic's Claude assistant with a free connector that checks suspicious links, phone numbers, email addresses and domains within a conversation and returns a verdict of malicious, suspicious, safe or unknown alongside supporting context. The connector requires no Malwarebytes account and additionally supports WHOIS domain look-ups, the analysis of several items from a single message, and reporting of flagged content to the company's threat-intelligence team.

=== Products ===
Malwarebytes develops security software for Microsoft Windows, macOS, Android, iOS, and ChromeOS platforms. Its main products include Malwarebytes for Windows and Malwarebytes for Mac, which combine malware detection, exploit mitigation, and ransomware protection. The company also distributes Malwarebytes Browser Guard, a browser extension that blocks tracking scripts and malicious sites, and AdwCleaner, a standalone utility for removing unwanted software.

Malwarebytes has several products, which as of 2011 were available in 36 different languages. Malwarebytes Anti-Malware provides two different versions, one for free download for home computers, and the other a professional version, with a 14-day free trial in advance, which provides "real-time protection against malware, automated scanning, and automatic updating". Malwarebytes Anti-Malware Mobile is a free Android app which protects smartphones from mobile malware, preventing unauthorized access to personal data identifying tracking applications. As of December 2025, it has a rating of 4.7 on the Google Play store.

In 2014, the company launched Malwarebytes Anti-Malware 2.0 with an improved user interface and dashboard. The company also launched Malwarebytes Anti-Exploit in the same year, which shields selected applications from attacks by "exploit mitigation to protect vulnerable programs". Anti-Exploit also comes in a free and paid for version for Windows computers. The free version stops exploits in browsers and Java, whilst the paid product adds protection for a wider range of software applications. Anti-Exploit received four stars from PC Magazine in 2015 and won V3 magazine's "Security Innovation of the Year" award in 2014.

In 2016, Malwarebytes Anti-Exploit was merged into the premium version Malwarebytes version 3.0, and the standalone application has since remained in perpetual beta.

In January 2016, Malwarebytes unveiled Malwarebytes Endpoint Security, advanced anti-ransomware technology which is described as the "first solution to offer multiple layers of protection against unknown ransomware". The company sponsored a survey with Osterman Research into 540 firms in the United States, United Kingdom, Canada and Germany and found that nearly 40% of companies had experienced ransomware incidents, of which 34 percent had accounted for loss of revenue. The Guardian reported that one-fifth of British companies had been charged over $10,000 to unlock their files and that there was an increasing demand for anti-ransomware technology.

In 2017, Malwarebytes expanded its portfolio to include mobile products for Mac and Android including Malwarebytes for Android and Malwarebytes for Mac. Malwarebytes also can be run on ChromeOS, but mainly provides protection against Android threats. Malwarebytes also released Malwarebytes for iOS in 2018 to deliver secure and private mobile experiences for its users. Due to Apple's security restrictions, Malwarebytes for iOS can not remove malware, but does provide basic web protection and spam blocking.

In 2018, Malwarebytes expanded its business portfolio by launching Malwarebytes Endpoint Protection and Response to monitor, identify and remediate attacks. This product line was expanded in 2020 to include server protection for enterprise customers with Malwarebytes Endpoint Detection and Response for Servers and Malwarebytes Endpoint Protection for Servers. In 2020, Malwarebytes also launched Malwarebytes Nebula, a cloud platform for enterprise customers to simplify endpoint management and reporting.

Malwarebytes also has numerous tools such as a Junkware Removal Tool to remove adware, an Anti-Rootkit Beta to remove and repair rootkits, StartUpLITE to boost the speed of the Windows reboot, FileASSASSIN to prevent locked files and a Malware Removal Service to support organizations under an active malware attack.

In 2020, Malwarebytes launched Malwarebytes Privacy, a virtual private network (VPN) service. This VPN service originally operated on Mullvad WireGuard servers, but switched to its own infrastructure in March 2025 following the acquisition of AzireVPN in November 2024.

In 2023, Malwarebytes acquired the online privacy company Cyrus, adding the digital footprint scanner and personal data removal services to its software.

In the same year, Malwarebytes added Identity Theft Protection, which can be added to any Malwarebytes plan.

Business-oriented products, distributed under the ThreatDown brand since 2023, include tools for managed and endpoint threat detection.

In 2024, the company expanded its consumer privacy software by acquiring the virtual private network service AzireVPN.

In the same year, the company launched Personal Data Remover, a consumer tool that scans data brokers and people-search sites, helps users request the removal of their personal information, and provides ongoing monitoring to support online privacy. In 2024, Malwarebytes also launched the free Digital Footprint Portal. This tool scans a wide range of online sources to show users what personal data connected to their email address has been exposed and provides recommendations for enhancing their online privacy.

In 2025, Malwarebytes announced Scam Guard, an AI-based tool for smartphones designed to help users identify and avoid scams.

In 2025, Malwarebytes was the only vendor to achieve a 100% detection rate in AV-Comparatives’ Android stalkerware test. CNET named it the 2025 Best Antivirus for Maintaining Privacy. Digital Trends listed Malwarebytes as a Recommended Product in its 2025 Windows security software review. In the PCMag Readers’ Choice Awards 2025, Malwarebytes was recognized in the categories of Best PC Security Suite, Android Antivirus, and iOS/iPadOS Antivirus. In PCMag's 2025 product evaluations, Malwarebytes was included among the Best Antivirus Software (Best for Speedy Scans) and Best Malware Removal and Protection Software, including recognition for eliminating persistent malware. PCMag ranked the company No.12 on its 2026 Best Tech Brands list and reported that it received the highest Net Promoter Score (NPS) among the brands evaluated.

In 2025, Malwarebytes also received multiple Excellent Certificates in the AVLab Cybersecurity Foundation's Advanced In-the-Wild Malware Test, including a 100% in-the-wild malware blocking result, and was recognized as Product of the Year (2025 and 2024) as well as Top Remediation Time 2025.

In June 2026, the company launched Scam Number Check, a free standalone reverse phone lookup service that checks a number against its threat-intelligence data and indicates whether it appears safe, suspicious or associated with known scams; it requires no account and lets users report numbers to build community-sourced warnings.

In October 2026, the company launched Scam Link Check, a free web tool for assessing a web address before opening it. The service analyses a submitted URL against the company's threat-intelligence data for phishing pages, recently registered domains and redirect chains, reports the result as safe, dangerous or unknown with an explanation, and can produce a screenshot of the destination page without the user visiting it.

=== License and privacy ===
Malwarebytes provides both free and paid editions of its security software. According to PCMag, the free version performs manual malware scans and removals, while the paid edition adds real-time monitoring, scheduled scans, and automatic updates.

The company states that the service does not log browsing activity, DNS requests, source IP addresses, or bandwidth usage. The information collected is limited to payment details, account credentials, and basic diagnostic data for troubleshooting purposes. Malwarebytes also publishes a transparency report detailing the law enforcement requests it receives. As of 2025, it has begun preparing for an independent third-party audit of the AzireVPN infrastructure.

In April 2026, the company announced the completion of this audit. Conducted by the security firm X41 D-Sec as a two-month white-box assessment of the Malwarebytes Privacy VPN apps and the company's diskless, RAM-only servers, the review found no evidence that user activity was logged and reported that identified vulnerabilities, including one rated critical, had been addressed.

== See also ==
- Antivirus software
