= Should I Remove It? =

Windows Application

- Developer(s): Reason Software
- Stable release: v1.0.4.36591 / April 7, 2015; 10 years ago
- Operating system: Microsoft Windows
- Available in: English
- Type: Utility software
- License: Freeware
- Website: shouldiremoveit.com

Should I Remove It? is a freeware utility from Reason Software that uses crowdsourced data to recommend removal of programs from Microsoft Windows systems.

== Features ==
Should I Remove It? uses crowdsourced data based on the actions of its users to report the popularity of software found on their computers. For each installed program that it detects, it reports the percentage of people who have uninstalled that program from within Should I Remove It?. Users can choose to view additional details sourced from Reason Software's website, uninstall software, or take no action. Software that is frequently removed is highlighted red, and software that is frequently kept is highlighted green. On the official website, Reason Software keeps statistical details of which programs are most often kept, the most commonly installed programs, and most popular publishers.

== Reception ==
Dan Russell of CNET rated 3.5/5 stars and wrote, "While many programs lack sufficient feedback for reliable ratings, Should I Remove It is a great place to start looking." Mike Williams of PC Advisor said that crowdsourced data "isn't particularly useful or reliable", but the application provides a good starting point for research. Tuong Nguyen of CNET said that while the maintenance and uninstallation tasks were not as powerful as other programs and the crowdsourced data could be misleading, it is "a must-have tool for anyone looking to tidy up his machine." Tom's Hardware rated it 4.5/5 stars and wrote, "This program manages to do a good job of making sure that your computer is free from bloatware and programs that you don't need." Ian Paul of PC World called it "easy and straight-forward", but called the program's reliance on accessing Reason Software's website annoying. Jon Russell of The Next Web wrote, "Most folks who treat their PC with care won't need this program, but if you’re someone who is less sure about your software then Should I Remove It could be a good option for you."
