= IObit Uninstaller =

Uninstaller for Microsoft Windows

- IObit Uninstaller Main Interface
- Developer(s): IObit Inc.
- Initial release: December 28, 2002; 22 years ago
- Stable release: 13.2.0 / November 17, 2023; 22 months ago
- Operating system: Microsoft Windows XP, Vista,7,8,8.1,10,11
- Type: Uninstaller
- License: Freeware
- Website: www.iobit.com/advanceduninstaller.php

IObit Uninstaller is a computer program uninstaller for Microsoft Windows developed by IObit Inc. It is used to completely uninstall applications and files related to them; users can select which items to delete.
