= Revo Uninstaller =

Uninstaller for Microsoft Windows

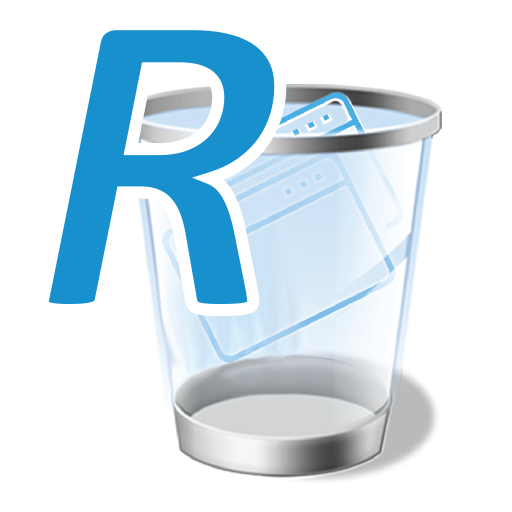

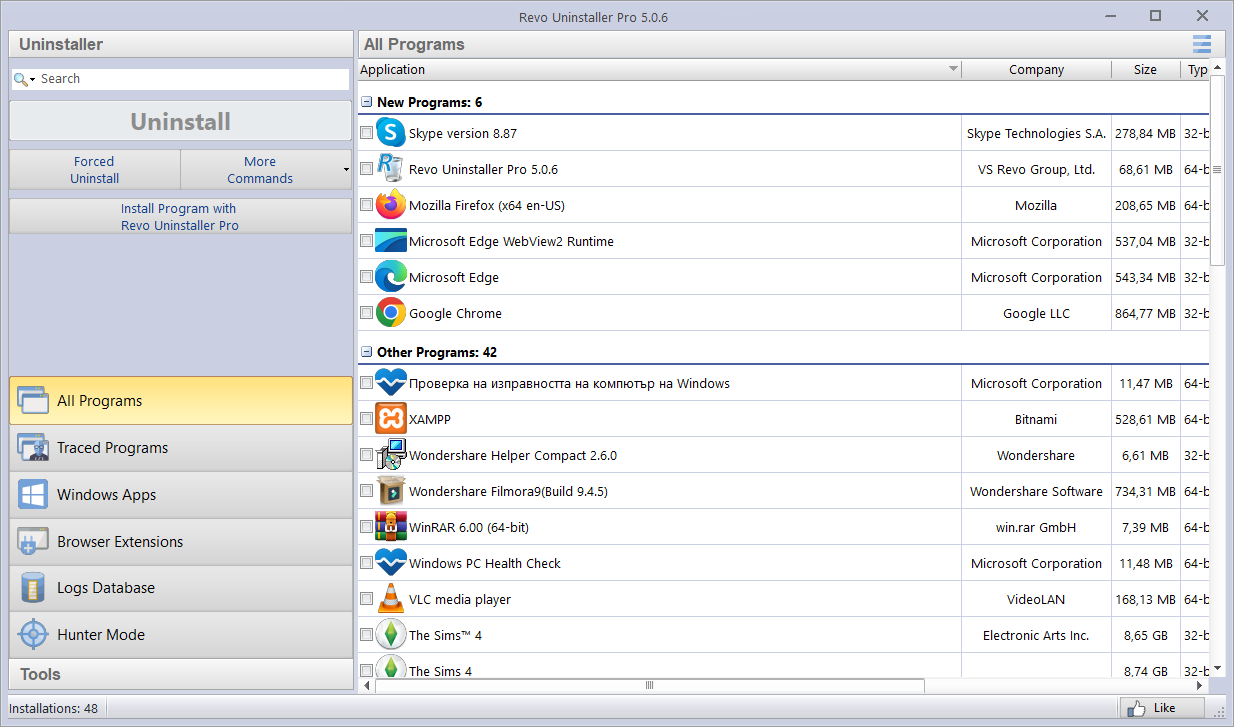
- Revo Uninstaller main window
- Developer: VS Revo Group
- Stable release: Freeware edition: 2.7.0; May 12, 2026; 4 months ago Pro edition: 5.5.4; September 23, 2026; 5 days ago
- Operating system: Microsoft Windows/Vista/7/8.1/10/11
- Available in: 47 languages
- List of languages English, Spanish, Albanian, Azerbaijani, Bengali, Arabic, Armenian, Albanian, Bulgarian, Czech, Danish, Dutch, Estonian, Finnish, French, German, Gujarati, Hebrew, Greek, Hindi, Croatian, Hungarian, Indonesian, Italian, Japanese, Korean, Kurdish, Macedonian, Norwegian, Persian, Polish, Portuguese, Brazilian Portuguese, Romanian, Russian, Serbian - Cyrillic, Serbian - Latin, Traditional Chinese, Simplified Chinese, Slovak, Slovenian, Swedish, Thai, Turkish, Vietnamese, Uzbek
- Type: Utility software
- License: Free edition: Freeware; Pro edition: Shareware
- Website: revouninstaller.com

Revo Uninstaller is an uninstaller for Microsoft Windows. It uninstalls programs and additionally removes any files and Windows registry entries left behind by the program's uninstaller or by the Windows uninstall function.

== Features ==
Revo Uninstaller first runs the selected program's built-in uninstaller, then searches and removes associated files and registry entries that the uninstaller may not have removed from the user's drive.

Revo Uninstaller also cleans out:

- Files in the temporary folder
- Entries in the Windows start-up applications folder
- Browser history and cache of Internet Explorer, Firefox, Opera and Netscape
- The recently opened file list in Microsoft Office applications

Revo Uninstaller can also irrecoverably delete files.

A portable version is available that can be run without installing onto or modifying the system, in particular from external storage media such as USB and network drives.

The freeware version 2 of Revo Uninstaller can support both 32-bit and 64-bit applications.

== See also ==
- Uninstaller
