= Melissa Long (journalist) =

American journalist

- Education: Syracuse University, University of Rochester
- Occupation: News anchor
- Notable credits: CNN Anchor (2005–2009); Bloomberg TV Reporter (2010–11)

Melissa Long is a journalist for WXIA-TV in Atlanta, Georgia. She was previously a news anchor and reporter for CNN.com, HLN and CNN TV.

== Biography ==
Long obtained her undergraduate degree from Syracuse University and MBA from the University of Rochester.

She joined CNN in 2005 and was based in the network's world headquarters in Atlanta. Prior to CNN, Long worked as an anchor and reporter for WROC-TV in Rochester, N.Y. She previously served as an adjunct communications professor at St. John Fisher College and wrote a weekly financial column for the Rochester Insider. Prior to WROC, Long worked at TV and radio stations in Syracuse and Utica, N.Y.

On 12 November 2009, CNN.com Live discontinued its anchor coverage. She continued to broadcast on-air for HLN, CNN and CNNI until February 2010. In March 2010 she became a correspondent for the Sydney and Hong Kong bureaus of Bloomberg TV. In late summer 2011 she became an anchor/reporter for WXIA-TV in Atlanta.
