= Joe Witte =

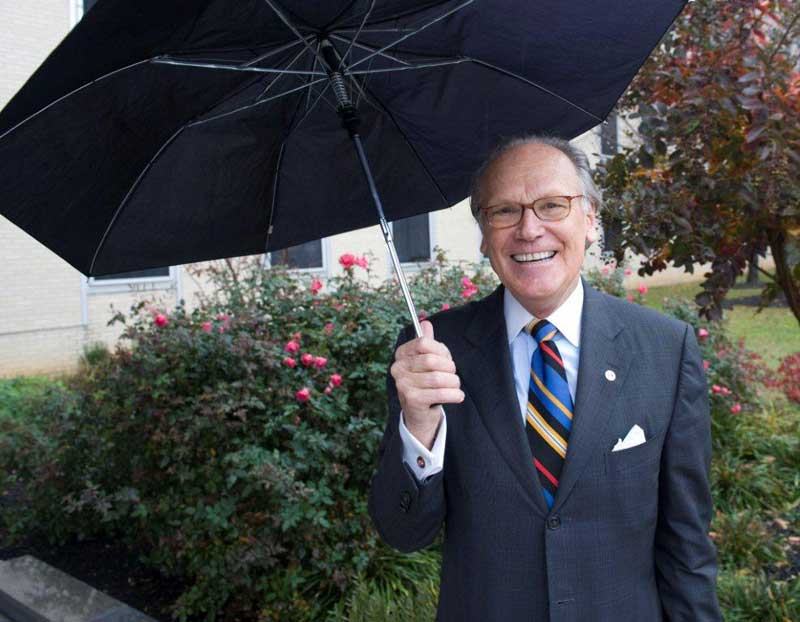
- Born: 1943 (age 82–83)
- Known for: Climate Science communication
- Scientific career
- Institutions: WJLA-TV, NBC, CNBC, NASA

Joe Witte recently retired as an Outreach Specialist for Aquent, a contractor of Jet Propulsion Laboratory, NASA. He adapted science content for use by 2,000 television meteorologists around the country.

Joe Witte began his career as a glaciologist with the USGS, conducting research on the South Cascade Glacier in the northern Cascades of Washington State, as well as on the Nisqually Glacier on Mount Rainier and the Blue Glacier on Mount Olympus. He was the principal investigator on ice island T-3 in the Arctic Ocean studying the Greenhouse infrared radiation budget as well as the ice crystals of the Arctic clouds, winter and summers. Next was 1 year at the Geophysical Fluid Dynamics Laboratory at Princeton, where original climate change computer modeling was created. An unexpected opportunity put Joe in front a TV news studio camera in 1970 at KING TV, Seattle, Wa. Four decades of TV news gave Witte opportunities across the country with 2 local TV news-team Emmys (NYC Blizzard coverage and Wash.DC hurricane coverage.)

Witte has contributed to numerous skunkworks projects that have evolved into successful initiatives. Notably, in 2009, he played a key role in the original concept team that led to the establishment of the NSF-funded “Climate Matters” programme. This initiative now supports over 1,000 TV meteorologists in communicating the science and solutions related to climate change. (https://www.climatechangecommunication.org/weathercasters/)

Witte has worked for WCBS-TV, WABC-TV, and WNBC-TV in New York City, as well as at stations in Seattle, Milwaukee and Philadelphia. While at WNBC-TV, he was the longtime weatherman on the morning program Today in New York. Witte served as the weatherman for the former NBC News program NBC News at Sunrise from 1983 to 1999, and as the weatherman and occasional fill-in host for Sunday Today from 1992 to 1995. Witte has also filled in for John Coleman on ABC's Good Morning America, and for Janice Huff, Willard Scott, and Al Roker on NBC's Today. He helped make John Coleman's beta project tape for the initial Weather Channel. Witte then served 4 years reporting on the weather's effects on the business world for CNBC from 1999 to 2003. He performed voiceover work for sponsor idents that appeared before various segments of NBC's Today.

Witte has often reported on NBC Nightly News and Dateline NBC as a weather expert and was chief meteorologist for NBC's Super Channel NBC Asia, and NBC Europe. He has also made appearances as a meteorologist on MSNBC. Witte was on the air non-stop for Hurricane Gloria in 1985, and also for the Blizzard of 1996 for over eight hours each for both events. Local Emmys for Blizzard of 1996 and 2003's Hurricane Isabel are among his awards.

Joe is a Fellow of the American Meteorological Society as well as of The Explorers Club.
