= Byron Miranda =

American journalist

- Born: California, U.S.
- Status: single, divorced
- Education: CSU, East Bay; Mississippi State University
- Occupation: Television journalist
- Children: 1

Byron Miranda is an American television journalist. The five-time Regional Emmy Award-winner was the meteorologist for the WPIX Morning News weekdays in New York City.

== Early life and education ==
A California native, Miranda served in the United States Air Force and worked as an air traffic controller in Korea. After the Air Force, Miranda attended California State University, East Bay, where he received his Bachelor of Arts degree in Communications in 1985. He is also a graduate of Mississippi State University's Broadcast and Operational Meteorology Program. To support his family, Miranda joined the Oakland Police Department before beginning his broadcast career.

== Broadcasting career ==
Miranda began his television career as an assignment editor and has worked in a number of major media markets, including Atlanta, Chicago, Houston, Los Angeles, New York, San Diego, and San Francisco.

- Atlanta: CNN, CNN International and NBC Early Today meteorologist
- Chicago: WMAQ (NBC) meteorologist (1998-2002, 2014–2017)
- Los Angeles: KCBS (CBS) chief meteorologist (2002–2005)
- Houston: KPRC (NBC) meteorologist (2006)
- San Francisco: KTVU (Fox) meteorologist (2006)
- San Diego: KGTV (ABC) chief meteorologist (2009–2011)
- Los Angeles: KNBC (NBC) meteorologist(2011-2014)
- New York: WPIX's PIX11 Morning News meteorologist (2017-2025)

== Personal ==
Miranda is the father of one daughter, Briana, a merchandise display expert, who lives in San Francisco.

=== Guest appearances ===
- 1999: ER, "The Storm: Part 1" Weatherman #1 (voice)

== Honors and awards ==
- 2000: Regional Emmy Award (Chicago/Midwest Chapter) Outstanding Achievement for Special Events Programs – Not Created for Television (Award to Producer), National Academy of Television Arts & Sciences; NBC 5 presents The 92nd Chicago Auto Show. Producers: Matt Piacente, executive producer; Lici Kestner-Lytle; Carol Cooling; Kevin Krebs; Tom Schnecke. Hosts: Brant Miller, Mike Adamle, Dawn DeSart, Byron Miranda, Amy Stone, Shelly Monahan
- 2002: Regional Emmy Award (Chicago/Midwest Chapter) Outstanding Achievement for Special Events Programs – Special Event Program Not Created for Television (Award to Producer), National Academy of Television Arts & Sciences; NBC5 presents: The 2002 Chicago Auto Show

Matt Piacente, Executive Producer; Lici Kestner-Lytle, Senior Producer; Lara Mondragon, Segment Producer; Carol Cooling, Tom Schnecke, Producers; Brant Miller, Jeanne Sparrow, Tammie Souza, Bill Keller, Ed Curran, Byron Miranda, Field Producers

- 2003: Golden Mike Award, Best Weathercaster in Southern California
- 2011: Regional Emmy Award (Pacific Southwest Chapter) On-Camera Talent – Weather, National Academy of Television Arts and Sciences
