= Malwarebytes (software) =

Anti-malware software

- Developer: Malwarebytes Inc.
- Release: January 2006; 20 years ago (as RogueRemover)
Stable release
- Windows: 5.8.1 / November 16, 2026; 1 day ago
- macOS: 5.29.2 / November 10, 2026; 7 days ago
- Android & ChromeOS: 5.34 / November 6, 2026; 11 days ago
- iOS: 5.36 / November 9, 2026; 8 days ago
- Operating system: Windows 10 and later, macOS 11 and later, Android 10 and up, iOS 18 and later, ChromeOS
- Platform: IA-32, x86-64
- Size: Windows: 287 MB; Android: 42.5 MB
- Available in: 30 languages
- List of languages Bulgarian, Catalan, Chinese (Traditional), Czech, Danish, Dutch, English, Estonian, Finnish, French, German, Greek, Hebrew, Hungarian, Indonesian, Italian, Japanese, Korean, Norwegian, Polish, Portuguese (Brazil), Portuguese (Portugal), Romanian, Russian, Slovak, Slovene, Spanish, Swedish, Turkish and Vietnamese
- Type: Anti-malware
- License: Proprietary (Freemium)
- Website: malwarebytes.com

Malwarebytes (formerly Malwarebytes Anti-Malware, abbreviated as MBAM) is a cybersecurity software suite for Microsoft Windows, macOS, ChromeOS, Android, and iOS that finds and removes malware. Made by Malwarebytes Corporation, it was first released in January 2006. This is available in a free version, which scans for and removes malware when started manually, and a paid version, which additionally provides scheduled scans, real-time protection and a flash-memory scanner. The suite also includes tools for checking whether messages, links and phone numbers are associated with scams.

== Overview ==
Malwarebytes scans and removes malicious software, including rogue security software, adware, and spyware. Malwarebytes scans in batch mode, rather than scanning all files opened, reducing interference if another on-demand anti-malware software is also running on the computer.

Malwarebytes antivirus has four plans: Free, Standard, Plus, and Ultimate. The free edition functions purely as an on-demand scanner. It can remove existing malware but lacks continuous realtime protection, so users must launch scans manually to stay secure. Premium plans add real-time protection and scheduled scanning, blocking malicious websites, scanning files and memory automatically, and performing daily "Threat scans" of memory, startup items, the registry, and file system objects, alongside other advanced scan modes.

In 2020, Malwarebytes introduced its own virtual private network solution, Malwarebytes Privacy, built on the WireGuard protocol.

In 2023, the software suite was expanded through the integration of technology acquired from Cyrus, a privacy services provider. This added automated digital footprint scanning and tools for submitting personal data removal requests.

That same year, Identity Theft Protection became available as an optional component that could be added to any Malwarebytes plan.

In 2024, the functionality of the software was expanded again following the acquisition of AzireVPN, adding another virtual private network service to the privacy features available to users.

Also in 2024, Malwarebytes released Personal Data Remover, which scans data broker platforms and people-search sites, assists users in removing exposed personal information, and provides ongoing privacy monitoring. The company additionally introduced the Digital Footprint Portal, a free tool that analyzes online sources for data linked to a user’s email address and offers guidance on improving privacy protections.

In 2025, the company was the only vendor to achieve a 100% detection rate in AV-Comparatives’ Android stalkerware test. In the PCMag Readers’ Choice Awards 2025, the company was named in the categories of Best PC Security Suite, Android Antivirus, and iOS/iPadOS Antivirus. In its 2025 product reviews, PCMag also included Malwarebytes among the Best Antivirus Software (Best for Speedy Scans) and Best Malware Removal and Protection Software, highlighting its effectiveness against persistent threats. PCMag ranked Malwarebytes No. 12 in its 2026 Best Tech Brands list and noted that it achieved the highest Net Promoter Score (NPS) among the evaluated companies. CNET named it the Best Antivirus for Maintaining Privacy in 2025. Digital Trends also listed Malwarebytes as a Recommended Product in its 2025 review of Windows security software.

Additionally, in 2025, Malwarebytes received multiple Excellent Certificates in the AVLab Cybersecurity Foundation’s Advanced In-the-Wild Malware Test, including a 100% in-the-wild malware blocking score. It was also named Product of the Year for both 2025 and 2024, and received recognition for Top Remediation Time in 2025.

=== Scam protection ===
In 2025, the product was expanded with the addition of Scam Guard, an AI-based mobile tool designed to identify potentially fraudulent messages and links. The feature is presented as a chat in which users paste suspicious content or upload a screenshot and receive an assessment together with suggested next steps; it is available to free and paid users of Malwarebytes Mobile Security on iOS and Android and does not require a separate application. Testing the feature for 9to5Mac shortly after its release, Arin Waichulis reported that it identified nearly all of the spam and scam emails and text messages he submitted, and that the guidance it returned was specific to the content rather than general safety advice.

In February 2026, Malwarebytes made its scam-detection technology available as a connector inside ChatGPT, and in April 2026 it released a comparable free connector for Anthropic's Claude assistant, letting users check suspicious links, phone numbers, email addresses and domains without leaving the chatbot. The Claude connector returns a verdict of malicious, suspicious, safe or unknown for each submitted item and requires no Malwarebytes account.

In June 2026, the company released Scam Number Check, a free standalone reverse phone lookup tool that checks a number against its threat-intelligence data and reports whether it appears safe, suspicious or linked to known scams, again without requiring an account.

In October 2026, it released Scam Link Check, a comparable free web tool for web addresses, which examines a submitted URL for phishing pages, recently registered domains and redirect chains, returns a result of safe, dangerous or unknown with an explanation, and can display a screenshot of the destination page without the user opening it.

=== Artificial intelligence ===
Malwarebytes uses artificial intelligence by integrating behavior-based machine-learning models into its malware detection engines.

In early 2025, reviewers noted that the Katana engine had been updated to include more advanced AI-driven and machine-learning approaches, allowing it to recognise malware families that had not yet been catalogued and improving its ability to address newly emerging forms of malicious software.

Further assessments in 2025 reported that Malwarebytes made broader use of heuristic analysis and machine-learning components to enhance the detection of evolving threats, contributing to more comprehensive behaviour-based protection within its consumer products.

== Security vulnerabilities ==
On February 2, 2016, Project Zero discovered four vulnerabilities in the Malwarebytes flagship product, including lack of server-side encryption for update files and lack of proper payload signing within encrypted data; the combination of which allowed an attacker to recompile the encrypted payload with exploits. Malwarebytes responded one day before disclosure in a blog article detailing the extreme difficulty in executing these attacks, as well as revealing that the announced server-side and encryption issues were resolved within days of private disclosure and were not outstanding at the time Project Zero published their research. Malwarebytes also published information on how to protect current users until a patch was released. This event also resulted in the establishment of a formal bug bounty program by Malwarebytes, which offers up to $1,000 per disclosure as of 2018, depending on severity and exploitability.

== Dispute with IObit ==
On November 2, 2009, Malwarebytes accused IObit, a Chinese company that offers similar products, of incorporating the database of Malwarebytes Anti-Malware (and several products from other vendors, which were not named) into its security software IObit Security 360. IObit denied the accusation and stated that the database is based on user submissions, and sometimes the same signature names that are in Malwarebytes get placed into the results.

IObit stated that the company did not have enough time to filter out the signature names that resembled those used by Malwarebytes. They also said that Malwarebytes did not have convincing proof and declared that the databases were not stolen. After the declaration from IObit, Malwarebytes issued a reply describing IObit's denial as "unconvincing". CEO Marcin Kleczynski told Softpedia that Malwarebytes served DMCA notices to CNET’s Download.com, MajorGeeks and SoftLayer, and that those hosts removed the IObit files as a result. IObit responded that it had removed the disputed signatures and updated its database after the allegations were raised.

== See also ==
- Internet security
