= Frances Rivera =

Filipino-American journalist and television news anchor

- Born: 1970 (age 55–56)
- Education: University of the Philippines Diliman
- Occupation: Journalist
- Spouse: Stuart Fraass
- Children: Tessa (daughter); Laz Conrad River (son)

Frances Rivera (born 1970) is a Filipino-American journalist and television news anchor who last appeared on the overnight news program, Early Today on NBC. For ten years, until August 2011, she was a television reporter and anchor for Boston's NBC affiliate, WHDH. She then joined WPIX in New York City as a morning news anchor. In February 2014, she joined NBC News and MSNBC where she served as co-anchor with Thomas Roberts on MSNBC Live. From 2017 to 2026, she was co-anchor of Early Today.

== Career ==
After graduation from college, Rivera returned to the United States to work at CBS Morning News in New York City. She worked at CBS affiliate KWTV in Oklahoma City, Oklahoma and NBC affiliate KFDX in Wichita Falls, Texas. She also worked off camera in New York City for CBS News' The Morning Show and covered the 1996 Presidential campaign. Rivera was also a co-host and reporter for the PBS show Asian America.

=== Boston ===
In 2001, Rivera joined WHDH in Boston and in 2006, was promoted to the news anchor chair.

=== Move to New York ===
In July 2011, it was reported that due to personal and family reasons, Rivera would leave WHDH in August 2011 for a New York TV job. Her last broadcast in Boston was Thursday, August 18, 2011. She left to join the WPIX Pix11 Morning News in New York City and began broadcasting there on Sunday, August 28, 2011 at 6:14 a.m. covering Hurricane Irene.

On August 6, 2013, Rivera accepted a buyout from WPIX and left the station at the end of that month. On her Facebook page, she stated, "Never been into on-air goodbyes, so for my last week at work, I insist on a no fuss, genuine one right here: Much love and goodbye for now!"

In 2014, she became a co-anchor at MSNBC. In 2017, she became co-anchor of NBC's Early Today. On May 22, 2026, Rivera announced she would be leaving Early Today with her last day on June 18, 2026.

== Personal life ==
Rivera was born in the Philippines. When she was three years old, she and her family, including her two brothers Andre and Marc, moved from the Philippines to Austin, Texas. Sometime afterward, they moved and settled in Dallas. Her family sent her to finish her studies in the Philippines, and she received her bachelor's degree in journalism from the University of the Philippines Diliman.

In 2003, Rivera married Stuart Fraass, a Boston mortgage broker, and in 2010, they had their first child, a daughter named Tessa. In fall 2012, she gave birth to their second child, a son named Laz Conrad River.

== See also ==
- Filipinos in the New York metropolitan area
