= Sean McLaughlin (meteorologist) =

American newscaster and reporter

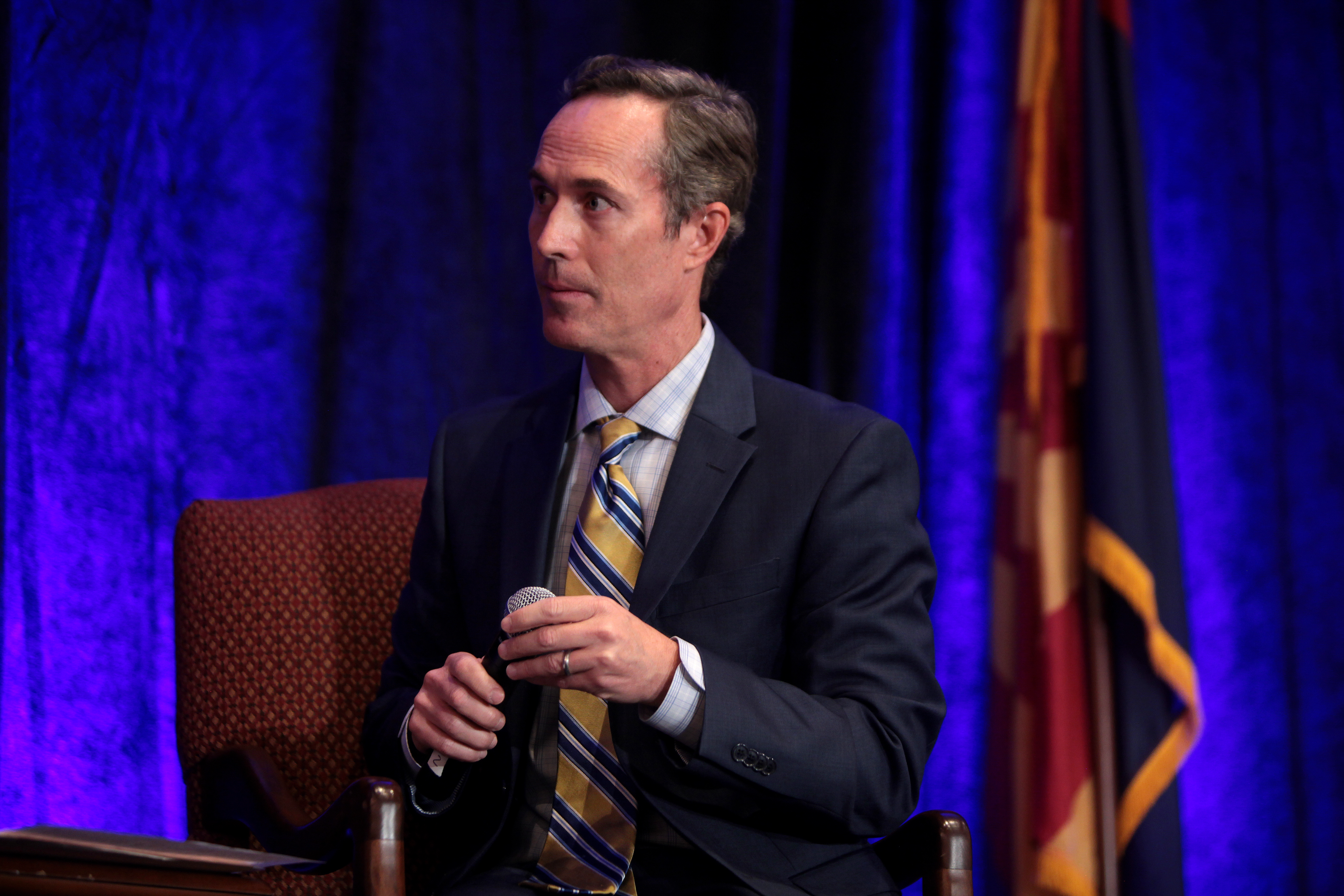
McLaughlin in 2015

Sean McLaughlin (pronounced Seen) is an anchor of the 10pm newscast and formerly the Chief Meteorologist at KPHO CBS 5 in Phoenix Arizona.

== Career ==
Prior to this stint in Phoenix, McLaughlin was chief meteorologist for MSNBC, joining the United States-based 24-hour cable news television network in July 2004. He was also the meteorologist on the Sunday editions of NBC's The Today Show. He contributed to NBC Weather Plus+, NBC Nightly News, and other NBC News/MSNBC/CNBC programs. McLaughlin's prior stint in Phoenix was as the longtime Chief Meteorologist, as well as anchor and general assignment reporter at NBC affiliate KPNX Channel 12. Currently he is a meteorologist, news anchor and reporter for KPHO CBS 5 in Phoenix. McLaughlin has won several Emmys.

His hometown is Belmond, Iowa.

== Education ==
McLaughlin graduated from Iowa State University with a bachelor's degree in broadcast journalism where he was a member of the Fraternity Tau Kappa Epsilon. He holds a certificate in meteorology from Mississippi State University.
