= May Mailman =

American political advisor (born 1988)

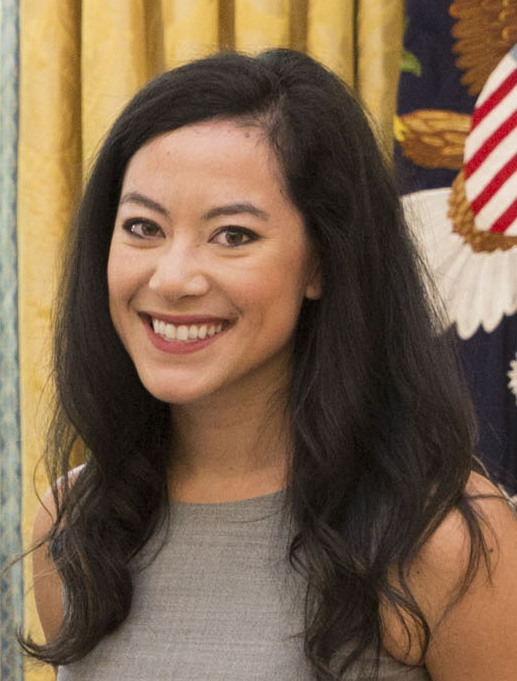
- Mailman in 2017

White House Senior Policy Strategist
- In office January 20, 2025 – August 1, 2025
- President: Donald Trump
- Deputy Chief of Staff: Stephen Miller
- Preceded by: Position established
- Succeeded by: Emily Underwood

Personal details
- Born: Sylvia May Davis; June 4, 1988 (age 38)
- Spouse: David Mailman (m. 2021)
- Children: 3
- Education: University of Kansas (BA); Harvard University (JD)

Sylvia May Mailman (née Davis; born June 4, 1988) is an American political advisor and attorney who served as the White House senior policy strategist from January to August 2025. Mailman served as the deputy solicitor general of Ohio from 2021 to 2023.

Mailman graduated from the University of Kansas and Harvard Law School. She clerked in the Court of Appeals for the Tenth Circuit from 2016 to 2017. Mailman served several positions in the first Trump administration, including assistant staff secretary, associate staff secretary, and deputy policy coordinator. She began serving as the deputy solicitor general of Ohio by March 2021, but left the role two years later. Mailman was named as director of the Independent Women's Law Center in January 2021.

In January 2025, Mailman was named as deputy assistant to the president and senior policy strategist. She left the second Trump administration in August to start her own government affairs firm.

== Early life and education (1988–2015) ==
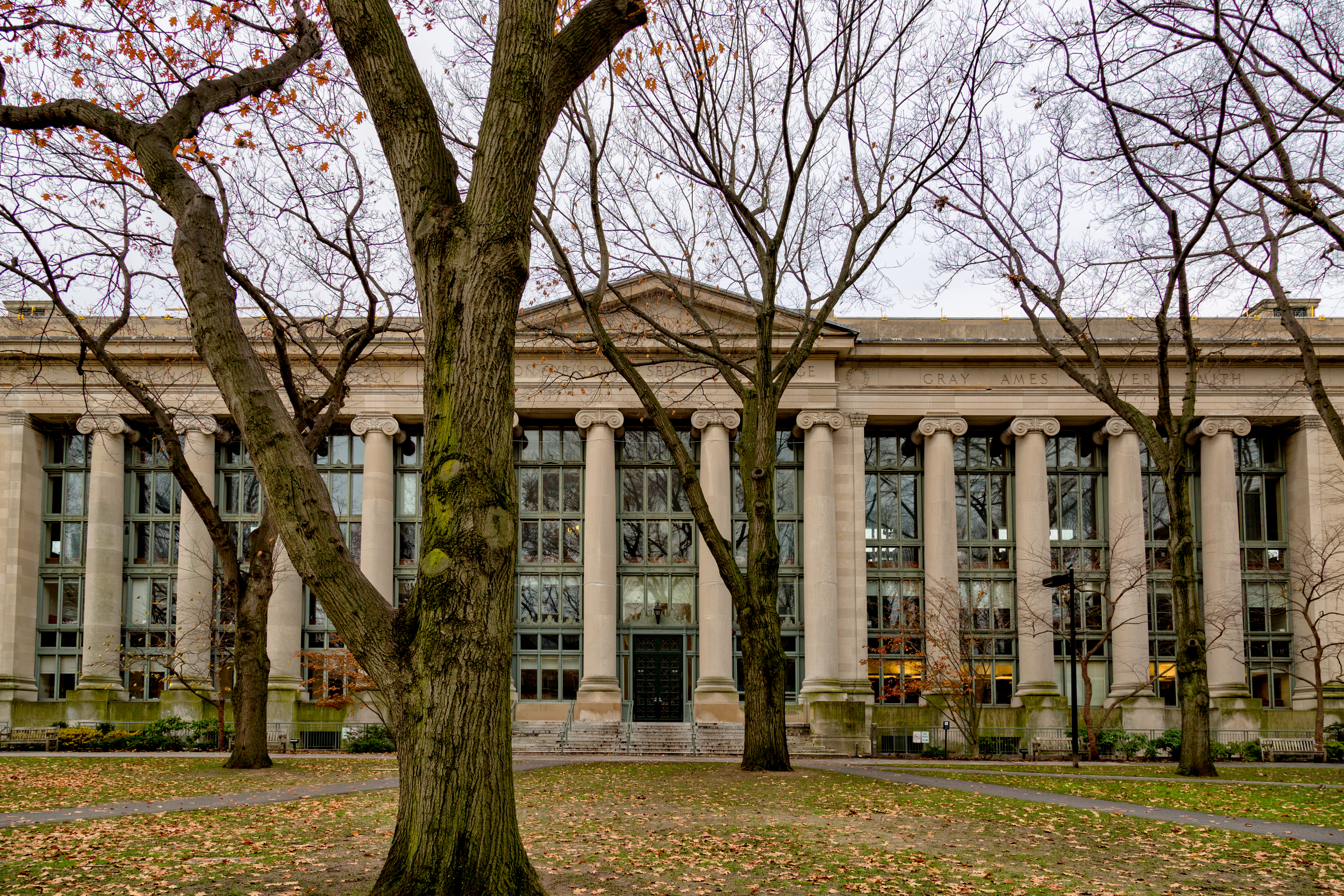
Harvard Law School, where Mailman studied (pictured in 2024)

Sylvia May Davis was born on June 4, 1988. Davis is the daughter of Duncan and Kyungae Davis. They met while Duncan was administering vaccines in South Korea in the 1980s. Davis was raised in Goodland, Kansas, and later moved to Clay Center. She graduated from Clay Center Community High School in 2006. Davis later graduated from the University of Kansas with a bachelor's degree and from Harvard Law School in 2015.

== Career ==
=== Law work and clerkship (2015–2017) ===
After graduating from Harvard, Mailman moved to Denver and worked for a law firm. She clerked in the Court of Appeals for the Tenth Circuit for Timothy Tymkovich from 2016 to 2017.

=== Political advisorship (2017–2021) ===
By April 2017, Davis had been named as an assistant staff secretary in the White House. That month, she was honored by the National Association of Asian Pacifics in Politics and Public Affairs in its "40 Under 40" list. By June 2018, Davis had been named special assistant to the president and associate staff secretary; that month, she was named deputy assistant to the president and deputy policy coordinator. In April 2019, The Washington Post reported that Davis had written an email to U.S. Customs and Border Protection, Immigration and Customs Enforcement, and Department of Homeland Security officials in November—amid an incoming caravan of migrants—discussing a proposal releasing migrants to sanctuary cities. Davis began working in the Office of White House Counsel prior to the COVID-19 pandemic. Emails released by the House Select Subcommittee on the Coronavirus Pandemic in April 2022 showed that Davis sought to remove guidance from the Centers for Disease Control and Prevention advising churches to hold religious services virtually in May 2020.

=== Deputy solicitor general of Ohio (2021–2023) ===
Davis resigned from her White House position in the days after the January 6 Capitol attack. By March 2021, she had begun serving as the deputy solicitor general of Ohio. That month, Davis had got engaged to David Mailman, a former professional baseball player. The two moved to Houston, got married in June, and had three children. May served as director of the Tenth Amendment Center for Ohio. She had left both roles by July 2023.

=== Independent Women's Forum (2023–2025) ===
In February 2021, Davis was named as a fellow of the Independent Women's Forum. She had become the group's senior legal fellow by April 2023 and—after serving as vice president of Restoring Integrity and Trust in Elections—was named as the director of the Independent Women's Law Center in January 2024. Mailman opposed president Joe Biden's revised Title IX rules that redefined gender identity and stated that the organization would sue the administration. She served as the head of RBG PAC, a super PAC that used over $20,000,000 donated by Elon Musk to run advertisements that targeted women between the ages of 18 and 45, seeking to associate Supreme Court justice Ruth Bader Ginsburg's stance on abortion with Donald Trump's stance.

=== Senior policy strategist (January 2025–February 2026) ===
On January 18, 2025, Mailman was named as deputy assistant to the president and senior policy strategist. According to The New York Times, she assisted the Trump administration in forming its education policy and encouraged attorney general Pam Bondi to prosecute doctors who perform gender-affirming surgeries using a law against genital mutilation. In May, CNN reported that several universities had privately begun to negotiate with Mailman to avoid punitive action from the Trump administration. Mailman was involved in negotiations to secure settlement agreements with Columbia University, Brown University, Cornell University, Northwestern University, and Harvard University, among other schools.

=== Post-government work (2026–present) ===
On August 3, 2025, CBS News reported that Mailman had left the Trump administration two days prior to start her own government affairs firm. In February 2026, Mother Jones reported that she was continuing to negotiate on behalf of the Trump administration in its dispute with Harvard University.

== Works cited ==
=== Articles ===
- Bade, Rachael; Miroff, Nick (April 11, 2019). "White House proposed releasing immigrant detainees in sanctuary cities, targeting political foes". The Washington Post.
- Bade, Rachael; Daniels, Eugene; Lizza, Ryan (January 3, 2024). "The House GOP's big border play". Politico.
- Bender, Michael; Blinder, Alan; Swan, Jonathan (April 14, 2025). "Inside Trump's Pressure Campaign on Universities". The New York Times.
- Bender, Michael (August 11, 2025). "The Harvard-Trained Lawyer Behind Trump's Fight Against Top Universities". The New York Times.
- Phillips, Bethaney (January 20, 2025a). "CCCHS Alum Named to Trump's White House Staff". KCLY. Clay Center, Kansas: Taylor Communications, Inc.
- Phillips, Bethaney (January 21, 2025b). "CCCHS Alum Recalls Time in White House, Women's Rights Career". KCLY. Clay Center, Kansas: Taylor Communications, Inc.
- Constante, Agnes (April 28, 2017). "Nonprofit Honors '40 Under 40' Asian Americans and Pacific Islanders in Politics". NBC News.
- Diamond, Dan (April 29, 2022). "Trump officials muzzled CDC on church covid guidance, emails confirm". The Washington Post.
- Daniels, Eugene; Bade, Rachael; Lizza, Ryan (November 23, 2022). "Is the Georgia runoff a done deal?". Politico.
- Daniels, Eugene; Bade, Rachael; Lizza, Ryan (April 7, 2024). "How the war in Gaza has reshaped politics". Politico.
- Jacobs, Jennifer (August 1, 2025). "Longtime Trump insider May Davis Mailman departs White House". CBS News.
- Klein, Betsy (May 31, 2025). "Universities quietly negotiating with White House aide to try to avoid Harvard's fate, source says". CNN.
- Lizza, Ryan; Bade, Rachael; Daniels, Eugene; Palmeri, Tara (February 23, 2021). "This week in Washington: Biden takes on rising crime". Politico.
- Lizza, Ryan; Bade, Rachael; Daniels, Eugene; Palmeri, Tara (June 21, 2021). "Anti-Big Tech crusader poised to join Biden admin". Politico.
- "Monday's Birthdays". Politico. June 5, 2017.
- Montague, Zach; Green, Erica (April 19, 2024). "Biden Administration Releases Revised Title IX Rules". The New York Times.
- Palmeri, Tara; Bade, Rachael; Daniels, Eugene; Lizza, Ryan (March 5, 2021). "McCarthy struggles to manage Trump". Politico.
- Pauly, Madison (February 5, 2026). "Meet the mastermind behind Trump's definition of 'woman'". Mother Jones.
- Schleifer, Theodore; Haberman, Maggie (December 5, 2024). "Elon Musk Backed Trump With Over $250 Million, Fueling the Unusual 'RBG PAC'". The New York Times.
- Sherman, Jake; Palmeri, Anna; Lippman, Daniel (June 4, 2018). "Four things to watch as Washington begins the summer". Politico.
- Shim, Elizabeth (May 10, 2019). "Trump praises South Korea firm for $3B investment in Louisiana plant". United Press International.
- Thrush, Glenn (May 12, 2025). "As White House Steers Justice Dept., Bondi Embraces Role of TV Messenger". The New York Times.
- Tobias, Andrew (July 28, 2023). "Outside groups, wealthy individuals flood State Issue 1 campaigns offers: Capitol Letter". The Plain Dealer.
- Quilantan, Bianca (April 24, 2023). "'What is a woman?': Kansas could be the first state to decide". Politico.
- Wren, Adam (November 15, 2025). "MS NOW flickers to life". Politico.

=== Documents ===
- "President Donald J. Trump Announces Appointments for the Executive Office of the President" (Document). White House. June 6, 2018.
