= Ladysmith, Kansas =

- Unincorporated community
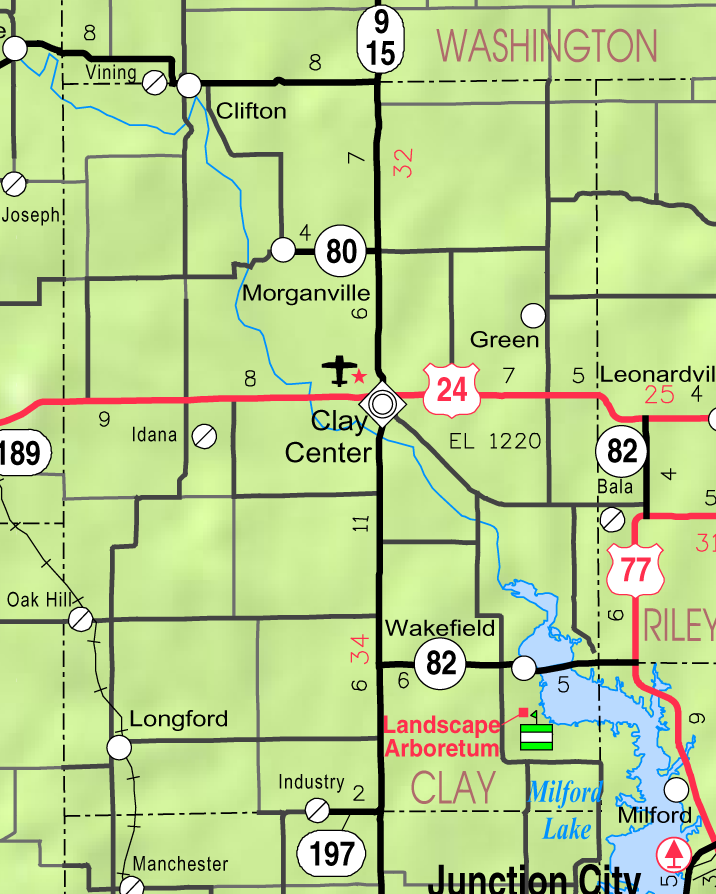
- KDOT map of Clay County (legend)

- Location within Kansas Location within the United States
- Coordinates: 39°16′17″N 97°11′04″W
- Country: United States
- States: Kansas
- County: Clay
- Elevation: 1,312 ft (400 m)
- Time zone: UTC-6 (CST)
  - Summer (DST): UTC-5 (CDT)
- ZIP Code: 67432
- Area code: 785
- FIPS code: 20-37625
- GNIS ID: 484768

Ladysmith is an unincorporated community in Clay County, Kansas, United States. It is located approximately 6.5 miles southwest of Clay Center along Kiowa Rd.

== History ==
A post office was opened in Ladysmith in 1900, and remained in operation until it was discontinued in 1906.

== Education ==
The community is served by Clay County USD 379 public school district.
