= Idana, Kansas =

- CDP
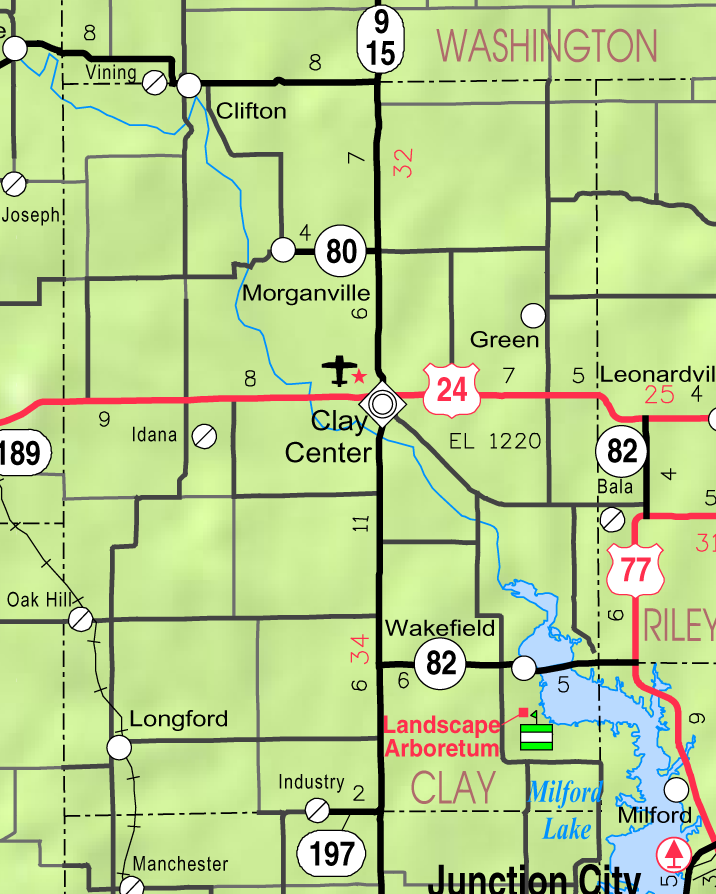
- KDOT map of Clay County (legend)

- Location within Kansas Location within the United States
- Coordinates: 39°21′34″N 97°15′58″W
- Country: United States
- States: Kansas
- County: Clay
- Elevation: 1,289 ft (393 m)

Population (2020)
  - Total: 54
- Time zone: UTC-6 (CST)
  - Summer (DST): UTC-5 (CDT)
- ZIP Code: 67432
- Area code: 785
- FIPS code: 20-44225
- GNIS ID: 2806500

Idana is a census-designated place (CDP) in Clay County, Kansas, United States. As of the 2020 census, the population was 54. It is located approximately 6.5 miles west of Clay Center, and 1.5 miles south of US Route 24 along 16th Rd.

== History ==
Idana is combination of the names of two settlers: Ida Howland and Anna Broughton.

A post office was opened in Chapmanville (an extinct town) in 1879, but it was moved to Idana in 1882 and remained in operation until it was discontinued in 1980.

Idana was located on the Union Pacific Railroad.

== Demographics ==
Historical population
Census	Pop.	Note	%±
2020	54		—
U.S. Decennial Census

The 2020 United States census counted 54 people, 18 households, and 14 families in Idana. The population density was 159.8 per square mile (61.7/km^{2}). There were 26 housing units at an average density of 76.9 per square mile (29.7/km^{2}). The racial makeup was 83.33% (45) white or European American (81.48% non-Hispanic white), 3.7% (2) black or African-American, 3.7% (2) Native American or Alaska Native, 0.0% (0) Asian, 0.0% (0) Pacific Islander or Native Hawaiian, 0.0% (0) from other races, and 9.26% (5) from two or more races. Hispanic or Latino of any race was 7.41% (4) of the population.

Of the 18 households, 22.2% had children under the age of 18; 77.8% were married couples living together; 11.1% had a female householder with no spouse or partner present. 22.2% of households consisted of individuals and 0.0% had someone living alone who was 65 years of age or older. The percent of those with a bachelor's degree or higher was estimated to be 0.0% of the population.

18.5% of the population was under the age of 18, 0.0% from 18 to 24, 31.5% from 25 to 44, 27.8% from 45 to 64, and 22.2% who were 65 years of age or older. The median age was 48.0 years. For every 100 females, there were 145.5 males. For every 100 females ages 18 and older, there were 158.8 males.

== Education ==
The community is served by Clay County USD 379 public school district.
