= Education policy of the second Trump administration =

Under the second presidency of Donald Trump, the federal government of the United States has sought to influence many aspects of education. President Donald Trump appointed Linda McMahon, a co-founder and former CEO of WWE, to be the United States secretary of education. McMahon was confirmed by the U.S. Senate by a vote of 51–45 on March 3, 2025. Trump and McMahon have sought to dismantle the U.S. Department of Education; on March 20, Trump signed an executive order directing the secretary of education to "facilitate the closure" of the department, and the Trump administration has sought to cut nearly all of its employees. Trump has said that the disbursement of student financial aid and student loans would be transferred to the Small Business Administration, while the U.S. Department of Health and Human Services would assume responsibility for the education department's special needs and nutrition programs.

The Trump administration has also sought to crack down on universities that it accuses of antisemitism and that it perceives as having a left-wing bias that discriminates against conservative students. The administration paused billions in federal funding to universities. Multiple universities have reached settlements with the administration, agreeing to its demands, including the suspension or expulsion of students who participated in 2024 pro-Palestinian campus occupations, taking steps to adopt pro-Israel policies (such as adopting the IHRA definition of antisemitism), paying fines, and enacting changes to its admissions policies. Harvard University publicly refused and criticized demands made by the Trump administration, filing a lawsuit against them and saying that the demands were an illegal overreach of government authority. In response, the administration paused over $2 billion in funding for Harvard. On September 3, 2025, Judge Allison D. Burroughs found the funding freeze illegal, writing that the government had infringed upon Harvard's free speech rights and that it was "difficult to conclude anything other than that defendants used antisemitism as a smokescreen for a targeted, ideologically-motivated assault on this country's premier universities".

Simultaneously, the Trump administration's science policy resulted in the cutting or freezing of large amounts of funding used for research on topics such as climate change, vaccines, LGBTQ topics, and COVID-19. The administration's policies against initiatives for diversity, equity, and inclusion (DEI) has resulted in the removal of thousands of online resources as well as the removal of around 400 books from the U.S. Naval Academy library. The Trump administration has also targeted many non-citizen activist students and academics for deportation, revoking over 300 student visas as of March 2025 for those that it accuses of promoting antisemitism or of supporting U.S.-designated foreign terrorist organizations such as Hamas. Some efforts to deport activists have faced court challenges of their legality.

The administration opposes public education (Executive Order 14191 and One Big Beautiful Bill Act), has sought to reduce the separation of church and state, scaled back civil rights enforcement for "students with disabilities, students of color and those facing sex discrimination" while prioritizing "allegedly discriminated against white and Jewish students", reduced support for English learners, and promoted historical negationism (Executive Order 14190).

== Background and campaign ==
Donald Trump, previously the president of the United States from 2017 to 2021, campaigned in 2024 largely with a promise to expand the U.S. federal government's power to manage education in the United States. Additionally, he pledged to fulfill his first-term promise to dismantle the U.S. Department of Education, a federal executive department established in 1980, which Trump said had been infiltrated by "radicals, zealots and Marxists". Many in his Republican Party have also criticized the department, accusing it of pushing "woke" ideology onto children, including ideology relating to gender and race, and have said that individual U.S. states should have authority over education. He said that he would limit federal funding to certain schools and universities, including those that imposed mask mandates or vaccine mandates during the COVID-19 pandemic, and those that he said teach curriculums that include "critical race theory, gender ideology, or other inappropriate racial, sexual, or political content". Trump said he wished to establish a "patriotic education" in the United States that "teach[es] students to love their country", "defend[s] American tradition and Western civilization", and promotes the nuclear family. His campaign also advocated universal school choice. Regarding college accreditation, Trump promised to "fire the radical-left accreditors that have allowed our colleges to become dominated by Marxist maniacs and lunatics".

== Personnel ==
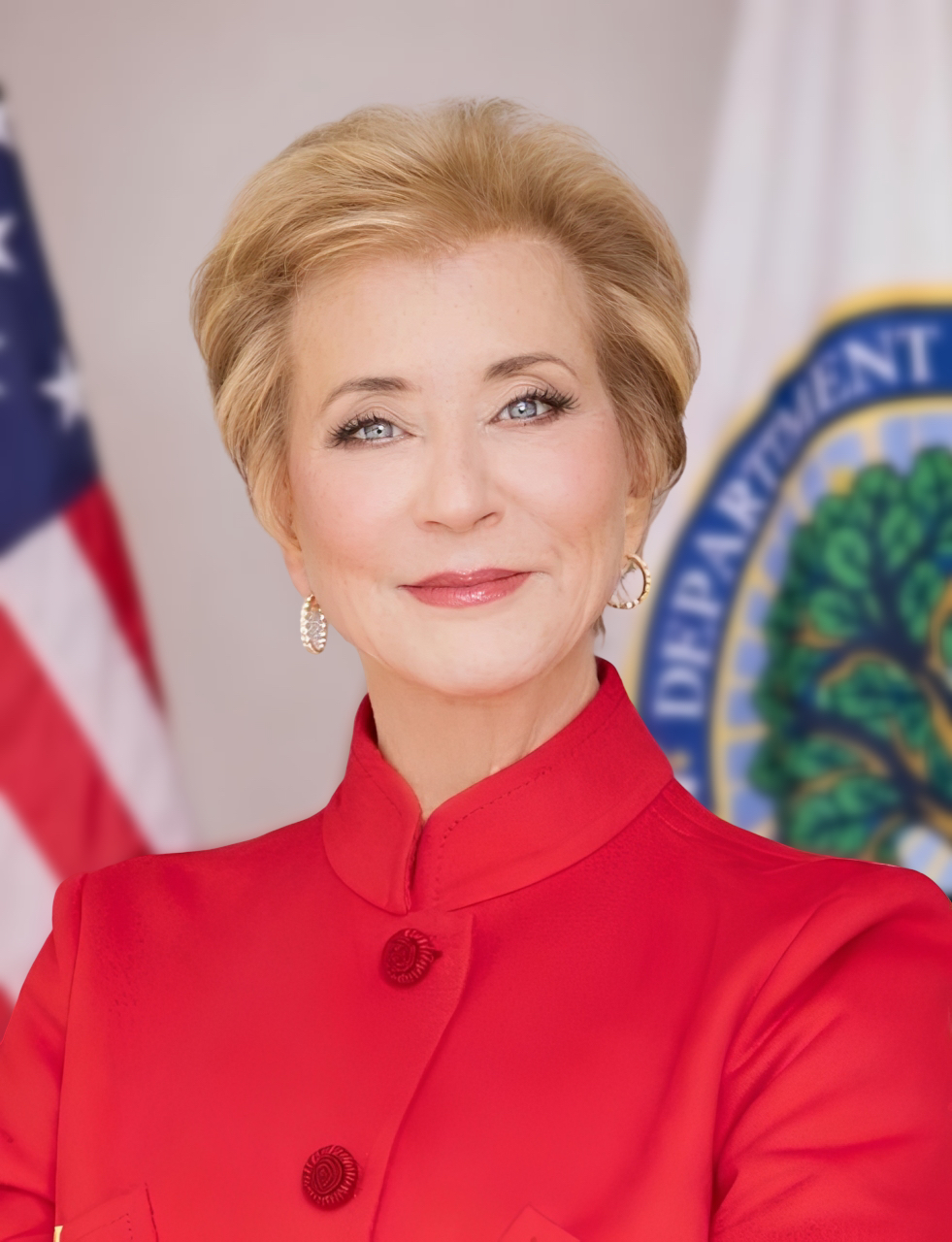
Linda McMahon, the U.S. secretary of education

On November 19, 2024, two weeks after Trump won the 2024 U.S. presidential election, Trump announced that Linda McMahon would be nominated by him to be the United States secretary of education in his second term. McMahon is the co-founder and former executive of World Wrestling Entertainment and was the administrator of the Small Business Administration during Trump's first term. Trump said that, during her tenure as the chair of the board at the America First Policy Institute, a conservative think tank, McMahon had "been a fierce advocate for parents' rights" and that she would "spearhead" the effort to "send education back to the states" by closing the Department of Education.

On February 20, 2025, one month after Trump's inauguration, the Senate Health, Education, Labor and Pensions Committee voted 12–11 in favor of advancing McMahon's nomination. On March 3, the full U.S. Senate voted 51–45 along party lines to confirm McMahon as secretary of education. She was sworn in as secretary later that day.

White House deputy chief of staff for policy Stephen Miller, current director of the Domestic Policy Council Vince Haley, senior policy strategist May Mailman and White House attorney Gene Hamilton have emerged as the leading officials behind Trump administration's policies toward universities.

== Education Department dismantling effort ==
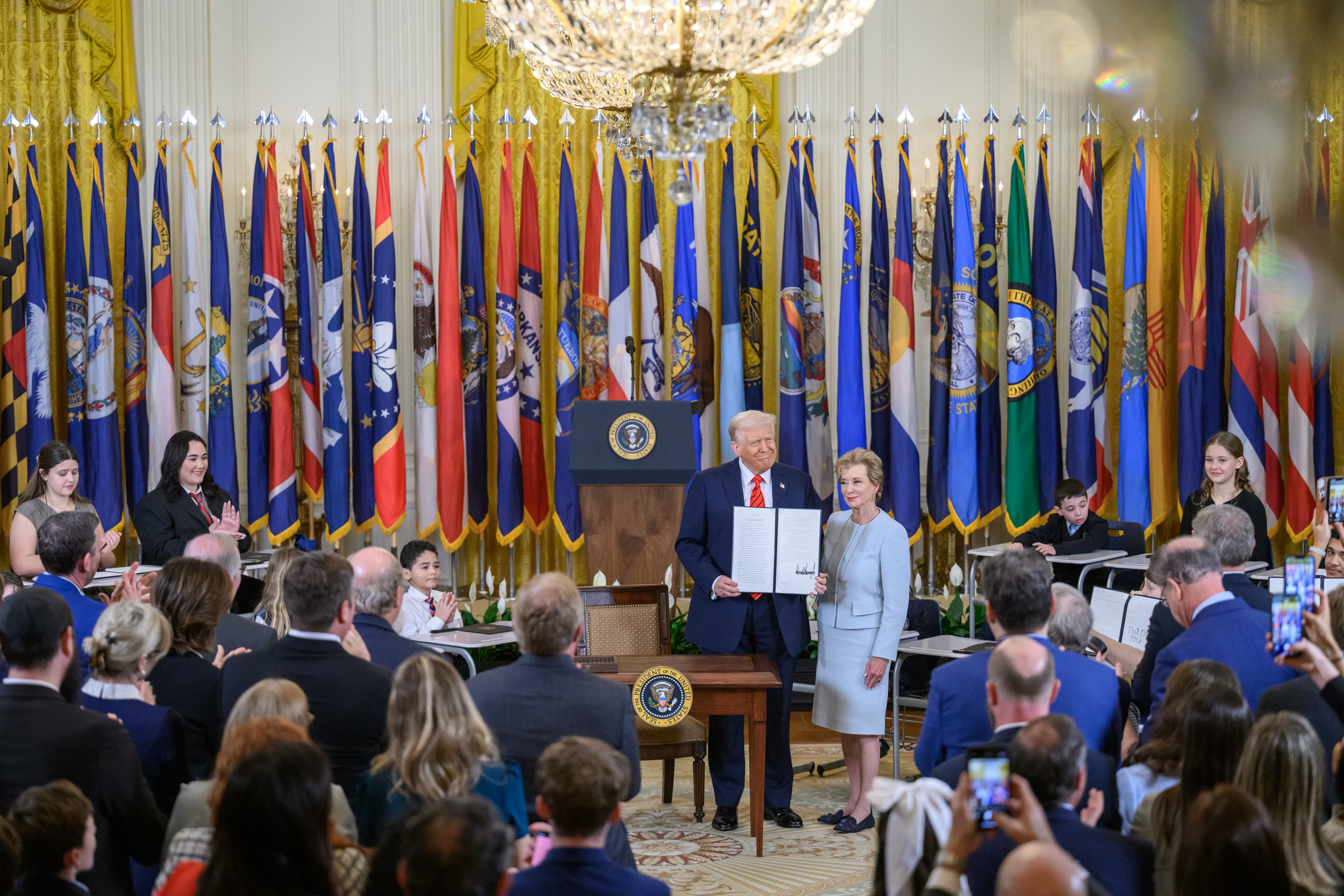
Donald Trump with Linda McMahon displaying signed executive order attempting to dismantle the Department of Education, Thursday, March 20, 2025.

Trump said that McMahon's primary objective as education secretary would be to facilitate the closure of the Department of Education. He said of her role at the department that: "I want her to put herself out of a job." When asked if the Department of Education was necessary for the United States, McMahon said that it was not needed. On March 20, 2025, Trump signed an executive order directing the secretary of education to "facilitate the closure of the Department of Education and return authority over education to the States and local communities".

The closure of a federal department such as the Department of Education requires an act of Congress, because Congress created the department. However, the Republican Party's narrow majority in Congress makes an effort to officially close the department unlikely to succeed. McMahon has said that congressionally appropriated funding for department services such as student financial aid will be unaffected by the plan to downsize or close the department. Trump said in March 2025 that the Small Business Administration would assume responsibility for student loans, and the U.S. Department of Health and Human Services would take over the department's special needs and nutrition programs. On May 22, 2025, U.S. district judge Myong Joun in Boston blocked the mass layoff and the dismantle attempt.

In February 2025, as a part of widespread layoffs across the federal government, the Department of Education offered all of its employees $25,000 if they agreed to resign or retire. The next month, the department announced a plan that would reduce its workforce by half. The majority of layoffs took place in the Federal Student Aid office that oversees the disbursement of financial aid and student loans, and the Office for Civil Rights that protects students and teachers from discrimination. In April 2025, the Trump administration announced that the Department of Education would resume collecting defaulted student loan debt on May 5, for the first time since March 2020.

In July 2025, the Trump administration moved to revoke access to the Head Start subsidized preschool program for undocumented immigrants and their families. The administration also made undocumented immigrants ineligible for postsecondary career and technical adult education programs.

== Universities ==
=== Actions against universities ===
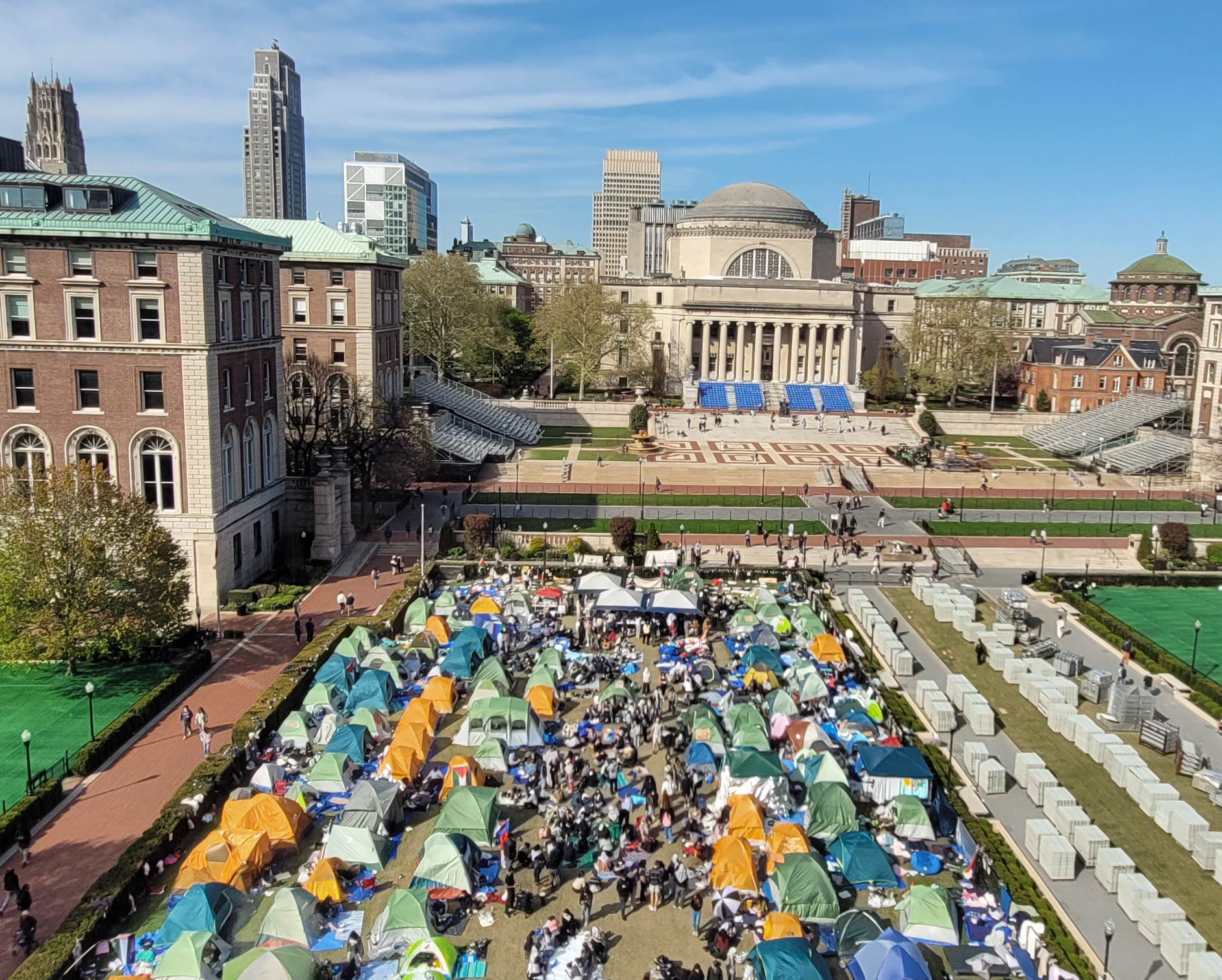
The April 2024 Gaza Solidarity Encampment at Columbia University, which the Trump administration has used as evidence of antisemitism at the university

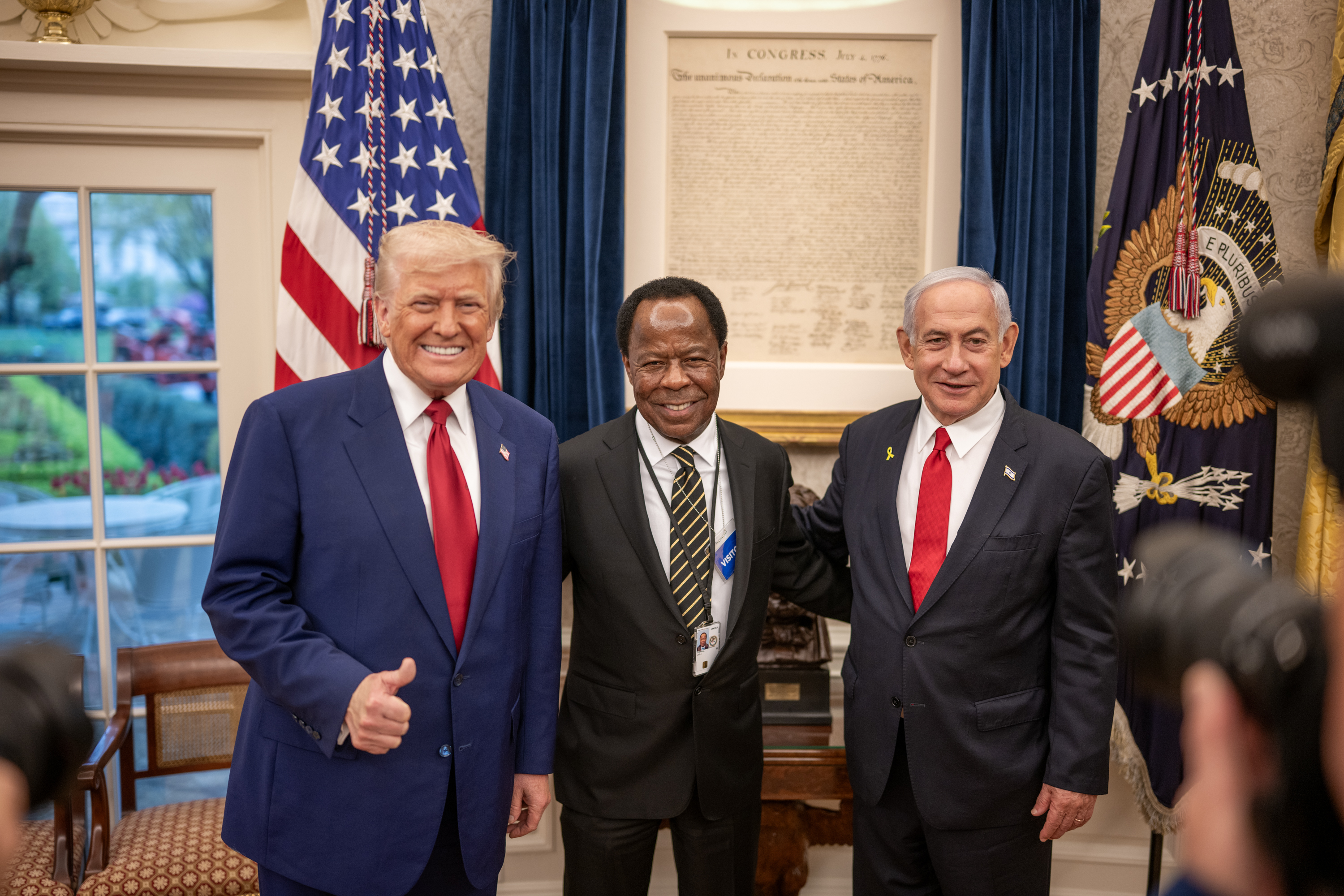
Leo Terrell, the head of the Trump administration's Task Force to Combat Antisemitism, with President Donald Trump and Israeli prime minister Benjamin Netanyahu on April 7, 2025

In February 2025, Leo Terrell, the head of the Trump administration's Task Force to Combat Antisemitism, announced that he would investigate Columbia University, Harvard University, George Washington University, Johns Hopkins University, New York University, Northwestern University, University of California, Berkeley, UCLA, the University of Minnesota, and the University of Southern California as part of the Department of Justice's investigation into antisemitism on college campuses.

Trump and many Republican officials have advocated for new laws and policies that crack down on campus curriculum and protests that they believe perpetuate a left-wing bias in universities and discriminate against conservative viewpoints. In March 2025, the Education Department's Office for Civil Rights contacted 60 colleges and universities across the United States to inform them that it had begun investigations of alleged violations of civil rights law "relating to antisemitic harassment and discrimination". This was followed by an investigation of 45 universities for allegedly using racial preferences. The Trump administration announced that month that it was cancelling $400 million in federal funding for Columbia University, "due to the school's continued inaction in the fact of persistent harassment of Jewish students" and "other alleged violations of Title VI and Title VII of the Civil Rights Act of 1964".

The Trump administration issued a demands to Columbia, saying that in order for it to begin negotiations on restoring the lost funding, it should place its Middle Eastern, South Asian, and African Studies Department under academic receivership, suspend or expel students who had participated in Columbia's 2024 pro-Palestinian campus occupations, take steps to combat antisemitism at the university, change its admissions policies, ban face coverings meant to hide the wearer's identity "or intimidate others" (with an exception for religious and health reasons), and acquiesce to other demands. Several academic associations condemned the demands as an attack on academic freedom; however, the university agreed to the demands, and announced that it would "overhaul disciplinary processes, ban masks at protests, add 36 officers with the authority to make arrests and appoint a new senior vice provost to oversee academic programs focused on the Middle East". Despite Columbia's agreement, as of May 23, 2025, the federal funding has not yet been restored.

Subsequently in March and April 2025, the Trump administration paused billions of dollars in federal funding for universities in express defiance of existing laws prohibiting such actions without following the proper legal processes which did not happen. It froze $1 billion in funding for Cornell University, $790 million for Northwestern University, $175 million for the University of Pennsylvania, threatened $9 billion for Harvard University, $510 million for Brown University, and paused academic grants to Princeton University. The administration justified the funding pauses by saying that the universities had not done enough to comply with the government's priorities, such as the combatting of antisemitic discrimination.

The letter sent to Harvard by Trump officials, April 2025

The administration's prescription [...] violates Harvard’s First Amendment rights and exceeds the statutory limits of the government's authority [...] And it threatens our values as a private institution devoted to the pursuit, production, and dissemination of knowledge. No government—regardless of which party is in power—should dictate what private universities can teach, whom they can admit and hire, and which areas of study and inquiry they can pursue.

— Harvard University's response to the Trump administration, April 14, 2025

Later in April 2025, the American Association of Colleges and Universities published a statement signed by more than 150 university and college presidents that condemned "unprecedented government overreach and political interference" in education from the Trump administration. Also in April, faculties at several universities in the collegiate Big Ten Conference voted to approve a "mutual-defense compact" against Trump administration actions.

On April 23, 2025, Trump signed several executive orders related to college education. He directed the federal government to "enforce laws on the books" regarding the disclosure of large donations to universities as well as regarding college accreditation, which Trump had called his "secret weapon" to exert control over universities. Additionally, he signed an order that established a government initiative to promote "excellence and innovation" at historically black colleges and universities.

In April 2025, Harvard University negotiated with the Trump administration for two weeks in an attempt to reach an agreement, such as that made by Columbia, to avoid the loss of government funding. Afterwards, a government lawyer from the administration sent a letter to Harvard demanding changes in its curriculum, hiring, and admissions policies, including hiring a third party acceptable to the Trump administration to audit "viewpoint diversity". Government officials later said that the letter had been sent in error.

Harvard publicly rejected the Trump administration's demands and called them an illegal overreach of government authority. In response, the administration announced that it had frozen $2.3 billion in federal research funding for the university. In addition, Trump asked the Internal Revenue Service to revoke Harvard's tax-exempt status. The U.S. Department of Homeland Security also told the university that it needed to share with the government detailed records about its foreign students—including "relevant information" about students holding student visas that had been involved in "known illegal" or "dangerous" activity, and information about the coursework of all student visa holders—or else it would lose its ability to enroll international students. Harvard responded by filing a lawsuit against the Trump administration in the District Court of Massachusetts, arguing that the freezing of funds was unconstitutional.

Decertification Letter sent by Kristi Noem on May 22, 2025

On May 22, 2025, Secretary of Homeland Security Kristi Noem informed Harvard that their Student and Exchange Visitor Program certification was revoked, and therefore they were now prohibited from hosting international students. Subsequently, US district court judge Jeffrey White issued an injunction, blocking the Trump administration from revoking the legal status of international students in US universities.

On May 23, 2025, Harvard sued the Trump administration for banning them from enrolling international students. The same day, US district court judge Allison Burroughs issued a temporary restraining order, blocking the revocation of Harvard's certification.

On May 27, 2025, the State Department ordered all US embassies to pause interviewing applicants for student visas, pending further guidance on "expanded social media vetting for all such applicants".

On May 30, 2025, the State Department ordered all US embassies and consulates to conduct "comprehensive and thorough vetting" of the online presence of anyone seeking to visit Harvard from abroad.

On July 23, 2025, Columbia University agreed to pay the Trump administration a $221 million fine to settle the government's claims against it and unfreeze funding. The deal, which would be in effect for three years, codified the majority of the administration's demands, such as prohibiting "illegal" diversity, equity, and inclusion programs, hiring new faculty and staff to supervise Middle Eastern programs and efforts to combat alleged antisemitism, and installing officers with arrest powers against students and an independent monitor to ensure compliance with the deal. Columbia stressed that the deal made no admission of guilt, and that the government did not have "the authority to dictate faculty hiring, university hiring, admissions decisions or the content of academic speech." Emboldened by Columbia University's decision, the Trump administration launched new investigations and lawsuits targeting UCLA, Duke, and George Mason University.

In July 2025, Brown University reached an agreement with the administration.

The administration was reported to have shared its intent to seek "all written communications" of faculty members at George Mason University who had drafted a resolution supporting efforts on diversity at the university.

On September 3, 2025, Judge Allison D. Burroughs found Trump's efforts to freeze billions of dollars of funding for Harvard illegal, writing that the government had infringed upon Harvard's free speech rights and that it was "difficult to conclude anything other than that defendants used antisemitism as a smokescreen for a targeted, ideologically-motivated assault on this country's premier universities".

On October 1, 2025, Trump sent an offer to nine universities, promising federal funding in return for commitments to advancing conservative ideas, banning the consideration of race or sex in admissions and hiring, and several other conditions. The "Compact for Academic Excellence in Higher Education" was sent to Vanderbilt University, Dartmouth College, the University of Pennsylvania, the University of Southern California, Massachusetts Institute of Technology, the University of Texas at Austin, the University of Arizona, Brown University, and the University of Virginia. By October 20, the deadline given for feedback on the initial draft of the compact, seven of the nine universities had rejected the proposal.

In October 2025, the University of Virginia made a deal with the Trump administration, agreeing to "not engage in unlawful racial discrimination in its university programming, admissions, hiring or other activities". The agreement followed the resignation of UVA president James E. Ryan under pressure from the Department of Justice.

In November 2025, Cornell University reached a settlement agreement, agreeing to the Trump administration's demands in exchange for the restoration of $250 million in federal research funding.

On November 28, 2025, Northwestern University reached a settlement, agreeing to pay $75 million to the Trump administration and implement policy changes in exchange for a restoration of federal funding. Interim president Henry Bienen said that "the payment is not an admission of guilt", and that the cost of a legal fight would have been "too high and the risks too grave". The terms of the agreement include "mandatory antisemitism training" and "providing safe and fair opportunities for women, including single-sex housing for any woman, defined on the basis of sex".

The deals and demands made by Trump were criticized as coercive, a shakedown, and legalized extortion in what Axios described as pursuit of a "cultural crackdown". Historian of academic freedom in the United States Ellen Schrecker has compared the Trump administration's actions unfavorably to McCarthyism, saying that Trump's actions against universities are more severe and far-reaching than the persecution of communists in academia during the Second Red Scare.

==== Cuts to research funding ====
The Trump administration has also cut or frozen research funding, including research on climate change; vaccines; HIV/AIDS; COVID-19; LGBTQ topics; diversity, equity, and inclusion (DEI); race and ethnicity; and other topics that the Trump administration has considered "woke". Some of the funding freezes have been used to apply pressure on universities regarding non-science related matters. The Trump administration's DEI policy has also led to government organizations removing or modifying more than 8,000 webpages and around 3,000 datasets. The policy resulted in the removal of around 400 books from the U.S. Naval Academy library, including Maya Angelou's I Know Why the Caged Bird Sings (1970) and Janet Jacobs's Memorializing the Holocaust (2010), while retaining Adolf Hitler's Mein Kampf and the controversial book The Bell Curve (1994) that discusses purported connections between race and intelligence. Scientists have largely seen the funding cuts and Trump's efforts to affect university education, as dangerous to the state of research in the United States, and many scientists have said they were considering leaving the United States as a result.

==== Student deportations ====
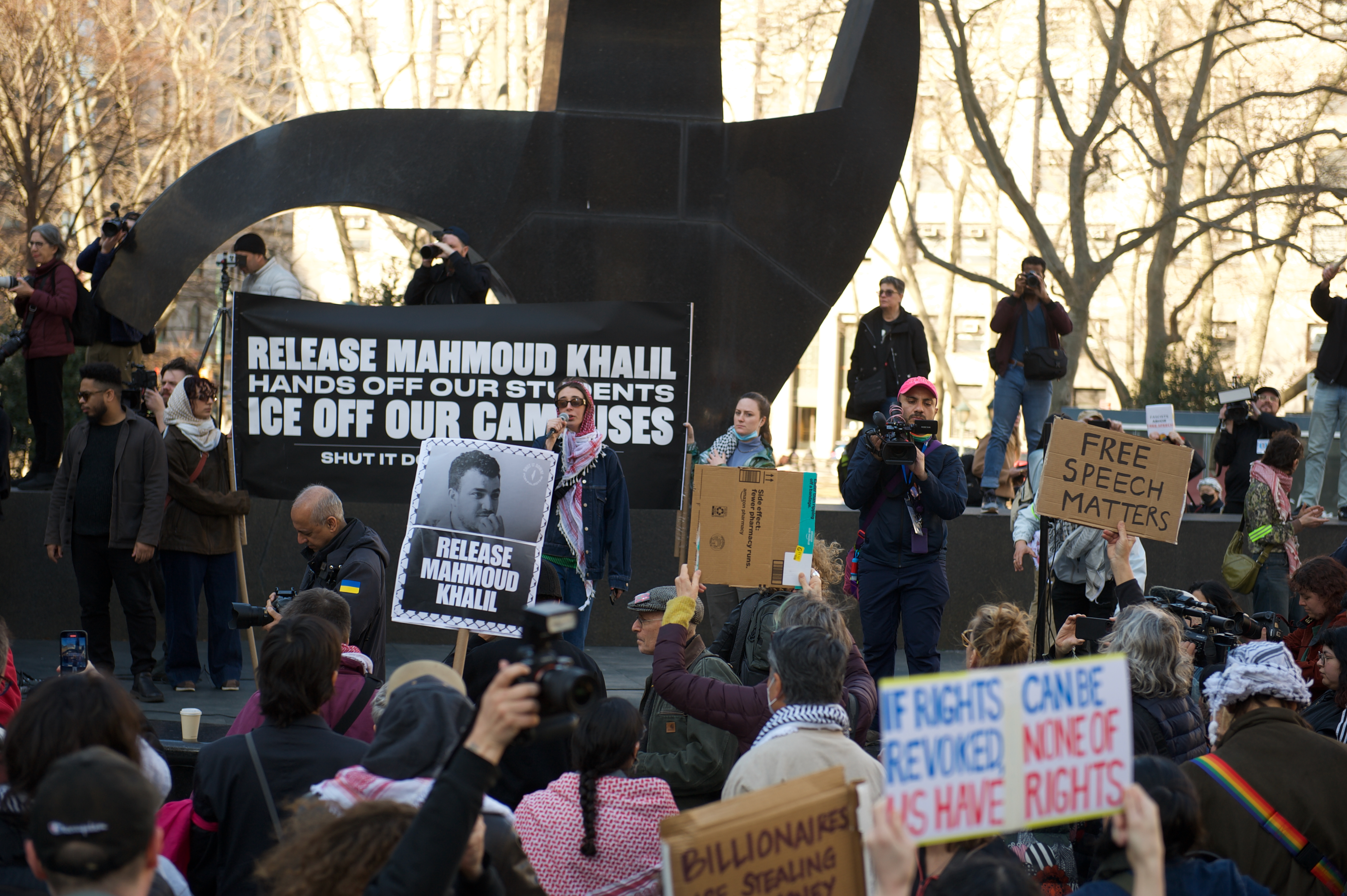
Protest against the detention of Mahmoud Khalil, New York City on March 10, 2025

As a part of its efforts to conduct mass deportations against immigrants, the Trump administration has pursued a policy of targeting many non-citizen activist students and academics for deportation. Marco Rubio, Trump's secretary of state, estimated that the administration revoked over 300 student visas by March 27, 2025. The Trump administration developed a "catch and revoke" strategy to monitor international students' social media posts to identify those that it believes are "pro-Hamas" or "antisemitic". In March 2025, the U.S. State Department said that student visa applicants would be ineligible if their social media activity indicated that they were "advocating for, sympathizing with, or persuading others to endorse or espouse terrorist activities or support a designated foreign terrorist organization". The Trump administration has targeted some professors, such as Lebanese Brown University professor Rasha Alawieh, who was deported despite a court order. Students targeted for deportation include Mahmoud Khalil, a leader of the 2024 pro-Palestinian encampment at Columbia University and a U.S. lawful permanent resident. To overcome his lawful permanent residency, the Trump administration has cited the Immigration and Nationality Act of 1952, which allows aliens in the U.S. to be deported if the secretary of state finds that their presence could negatively impact U.S. foreign policy.

On May 28, 2025, Rubio announced that the US would "aggressively revoke visas for Chinese students, including those with connections to the Chinese Communist Party or studying in critical fields" and "revise visa criteria to enhance scrutiny of all future visa applications from the People’s Republic of China and Hong Kong." China's Ministry of Foreign Affairs formally objected to Rubio's announcement. Commenting on Rubio's announcement a day later, State department spokeswoman Tammy Bruce said the United States "will not tolerate the CCP's exploitation of U.S. universities or theft of U.S. research intellectual property or technologies to grow its military power, conduct intelligence collection or repress voices of opposition." In response, Chinese students told media that they came to the U.S. for freedoms they felt they did not have back in China but that now the Trump administration is starting to resemble the strict regime they left behind.

==== Finance ====
The administration announced it would lift the 2020 pause on garnishing wages and federal payments (such as tax refunds, Social Security benefits) for student loan borrowers who are in default which could affect millions. In March 2025, Trump signed Executive Order 14235 to limit eligibility for Public Service Loan Forgiveness. In October 2025, the administration finalized revisions to the Public Service Loan Forgiveness program, expanding the power of the Education Department to exclude organizations that engage in activities involving a "substantial illegal purpose", including puberty blockers for trans youth (referred to as "chemical castration") and illegal immigration.

The administration redirected around $500 million to HBCUs and tribal colleges and universities while cutting other programs for minority students.

The Justice Department has challenged in-state tuition for undocumented students in California, Illinois, Kentucky, Minnesota, Oklahoma, Texas, Virginia.

== K–12 education ==
In February 2025, the Department of Education established an "end-DEI" portal to take complaints about DEI programs in K–12 schools. The administration also warned of cuts in federal funding for universities that continued with diversity, equity and inclusion (DEI) programs.

In April 2025, the Trump administration demanded that states receiving money for sex education under the Personal Responsibility Education Program (PREP) remove all references to gender identity, transgender and non-binary people from the curriculum, referring to it as "gender ideology". As of October 2025, at least eleven states have complied with the demands, while 16 other states and Washington DC have filed a lawsuit. On October 27, 2025, the deadline given by the administration to comply or risk losing federal funding, U.S. district court judge Ann Aiken ruled that the Department of Health and Human Services (HHS) may not cut funding from states that do not comply.

== Civil rights ==
The administration dropped investigations into pending civil rights complaints related to book bans in public schools.

The Department of Education reverted to Title IX guidance from the first Trump presidency, affording stronger rights to alleged sexual harassers and assailants, and removing recognition of discrimination based on sexual orientation and gender identity.

The administration texted Barnard College employees to ask if they're Jewish and sued the University of Pennsylvania alleging the university “refused to comply” with a subpoena from the administration to share names and information of Jews at the university.

== Academics leaving the US in response ==
In response to Trump's education policy, researchers, scientists, and post-docs are reportedly leaving or trying to leave the United States. A poll done by scientific journal Nature, 75% of US scientists are considering leaving. Of the 690 postgraduate researchers who responded, 548 were considering leaving; 255 of 340 PhD students said the same.

In May 2025, Marci Shore, Timothy Snyder and Jason Stanley, academics who specialize in studying authoritarianism across the globe, announced they are leaving the United States in response to Trump's crackdown of higher education. In an interview, Shore referred to Nazi Germany and said the "lesson of 1933 is you get out sooner rather than later."

== Other reactions ==
In June 2025, hundreds of American CEOs criticized Trump's attacks on universities through an open letter organized by the Leadership Now Project, saying funding cuts and student visa restrictions impact America's economic competitiveness. The signatories to the letter included LinkedIn founder Reid Hoffman, former Unilever CEO Paul Polman, former American Airlines CEO Robert Crandall, former Procter & Gamble CEO John Pepper, Jeni Britton of Jeni’s Ice Cream, and Tom Florsheim of the Weyco Group.

On November 7, 2025, a coordinated protest against the Trump administration's actions against universities was held on over 100 campuses throughout the US.
