= Compact for Academic Excellence in Higher Education =

2025 American higher education proposal

The Compact for Academic Excellence in Higher Education is a proposal by the Trump administration to American universities. The compact would confer access to federal funds in exchange for agreeing to demands. In a letter introducing the compact, Education Secretary Linda McMahon described it as supporting university students to "grow into resilient, curious, and moral leaders, inspired by American and Western values." The compact purports to offer "multiple positive benefits" and "substantial and meaningful federal grants" to those universities that would abide by it. Policy analyst Kevin Carey described the compact as "the newest escalation in Trump’s attempt to impose ideological dominance over" American higher education.

The compact was proposed on October 1, 2025, to Brown University, Dartmouth College, Massachusetts Institute of Technology, University of Arizona, University of Pennsylvania, University of Southern California, University of Texas at Austin, University of Virginia, and Vanderbilt University. It was sent along with a letter from Secretary of Education Linda McMahon, May Mailman, senior adviser for special projects at the White House, and Vincent Haley, director of the Domestic Policy Council. On October 14, the administration extended the offer to sign the compact to any US higher education institution.

On October 10, MIT rejected participation in the compact in a letter to McMahon. Further rejections followed, from Brown University on October 15, the University of Pennsylvania and the University of Southern California on October 16, the University of Virginia on October 17, and Dartmouth College on October 18. On October 20, the deadline given for feedback on the initial draft of the compact, the University of Arizona became the seventh of the nine invited universities to reject the proposal. “We are not seeking any special treatment and believe in our ability to compete for federally funded research based solely on merit,” said Suresh Garimella, president of the University of Arizona.

In October 2025, New College of Florida stated in a press release that they wanted to be the first school to sign the compact. New College was not one of the institutions initially invited to sign.

Specific demands by the compact would include a cap on international undergraduate students of 15% and a tuition fee freeze for five years. The text of the compact has been shared with multiple media outlets.

== Reactions ==
The proposal was criticized variously as a violation of the free speech guarantee of the First Amendment to the United States Constitution, ideological interference in science and academia, harming transgender students, and anti-immigrant. The administration was also criticized as untrustworthy, with some institutions having existing agreements now being met with new demands.

Sian Leah Beilock, Dartmouth College's President, responded to the compact by vowing to "always defend our fierce independence" and stating, "We will never compromise our academic freedom and our ability to govern ourselves." Kevin Elte, head of the University of Texas Board of Regents, responded positively, stating, “Today we welcome the new opportunity presented to us and we look forward to working with the Trump Administration on it.”

The American Association of Colleges and Universities issued a statement rejecting the Compact, and declaring that university administrators "cannot bargain with the essential freedom of colleges and universities to determine, on academic grounds, whom to admit and what is taught, how, and by whom."

On October 15, president Christina Paxson publicly posted Brown University's response rejecting the Compact. She referenced a July 30 voluntary agreement restoring funding to Brown in return for an enhanced commitment to the university's implementation of federal laws prohibiting discrimination. She wrote that the July 30 agreement advanced high-level principles of the Compact while maintaining academic freedom, continuing, "I am concerned that the Compact by its nature and by various provisions would restrict academic freedom and undermine the autonomy of Brown’s governance, critically compromising our ability to fulfill our mission."

University of Arizona workers protested the compact on multiple occasions, including a teach-in on October 15 hosted by the United Campus Workers of Arizona CWA Local 7065, and a larger protest and march on October 18 that involved eighteen on-campus groups urging campus administrators to reject the compact.

On November 5, 2025, about 100 protesters at Vanderbilt University demanded that the university reject the compact.
