= Punchbowl News =

US online political news daily

- Screenshot Punchbowl News' homepage on May 12, 2024
- Website type: News
- Available in: English
- Founders: Jake Sherman; Anna Palmer; John Bresnahan; Rachel Schindler
- Employees: 30
- Website: punchbowl.news
- Commercial: Yes
- Launched: 2021; 5 years ago
- Current status: Active

Punchbowl News is an online political news daily in Washington, D.C., which debuted on January 3, 2021, as "a membership-based news community", focused on the individuals "who power the US legislature". It aims to be non-partisan and non-judgemental, focusing on scoops and facts about Congress and the Washington power establishment, particularly core power players.

The initial products from Punchbowl included a free weekday-morning newsletter. Premium subscribers (annual subscription: $300) also received afternoon and evening editions, and access to question-and-answer sessions with the authors, online via Zoom, and a Sunday conversation. The team launched a podcast with Cadence13 in early February 2021, and by early April 2021, it was available as The Daily Punch on Apple Podcasts Preview. Conference calls and virtual events are also to be provided to subscribers.

== Concept and orientation ==
The publication gets its name from the codename used by the U.S. Secret Service for the U.S. Capitol.

In a January 2021 interview with the Columbia Journalism Review, co-founder Jake Sherman indicated that Punchbowl's objectives were to:

1. make news "a conversation between... audience and... reporters".
2. "chart power and... focus on the one hundred [persons in power who] matter... congressional leadership... people around [them], corporations that war in Washington, [along with] leadership at the White House".

Sherman indicated that the publication would be non-partisan, and refrain from value judgments and commentary, focusing instead on identifying newsworthy facts.

Washington insiders, as subscribers, were the Punchbowl's initial target market. Sherman described his target market as "people who have to exist in Washington, people who have to exist in the government or who deeply care about the government, either as a hobby or as a profession."

Sherman said that Punchbowl News would differentiate itself from other media by largely ignoring sensational stories about the declarations, posturing, and gaffes of individual politicians and officials — focusing, instead, on "power... exercise of power... people abusing power".

== History and activities ==
Punchbowl News was founded by three journalist-authors departing Politico: Jake Sherman and Anna Palmer (co-authors of Politico Playbook and the best-seller The Hill to Die On: The Battle for Congress and the Future of Trump’s America), and co-founder John Bresnahan, a then-recent Capitol Hill reporter for Politico, along with Rachel Schindler, formerly with Facebook's news team.

Initial funding, organized by the media banker Aryeh Bourkoff of Kindred Media, was US$1 million, which was relatively minor startup funding compared to the semi-rivals Politico and Axios. However, Sherman reported that they initially garnered far more subscribers than expected.

Initial staffing involved only the four co-founders, with Palmer as CEO and Schindler running operations — but Sherman indicated in January that they planned to expand and diversify the team.

Within 72 hours of the first publication of Punchbowl News on January 6, 2021, the Capitol was stormed and occupied by protestors in a violent riot. Sherman and Bresnahan were present behind a door on which protesters were banging.

In February 2021, Punchbowl News was sued by Punchbowl, Inc., a Massachusetts greeting card company, for trademark infringement—claiming that the Punchbowl News company name, logo and trademark color unfairly resembled theirs. The suit was dismissed in Virginia for improper venue. Punchbowl, Inc., re-filed in California. Punchbowl News won on summary judgement and the case was dismissed. Punchbowl Inc. filed an appeal to the Ninth Circuit, and Punchbowl News won again.

In January 2023, Voice of America reported that Punchbowl News received sponsorship funding from Alibaba Group.

In December 2023, Punchbowl News announced its acquisition of Electo Analytics, a company created to analyze legislation. They planned to use it as a source for data for subscribers.
