= Anna Palmer =

American journalist

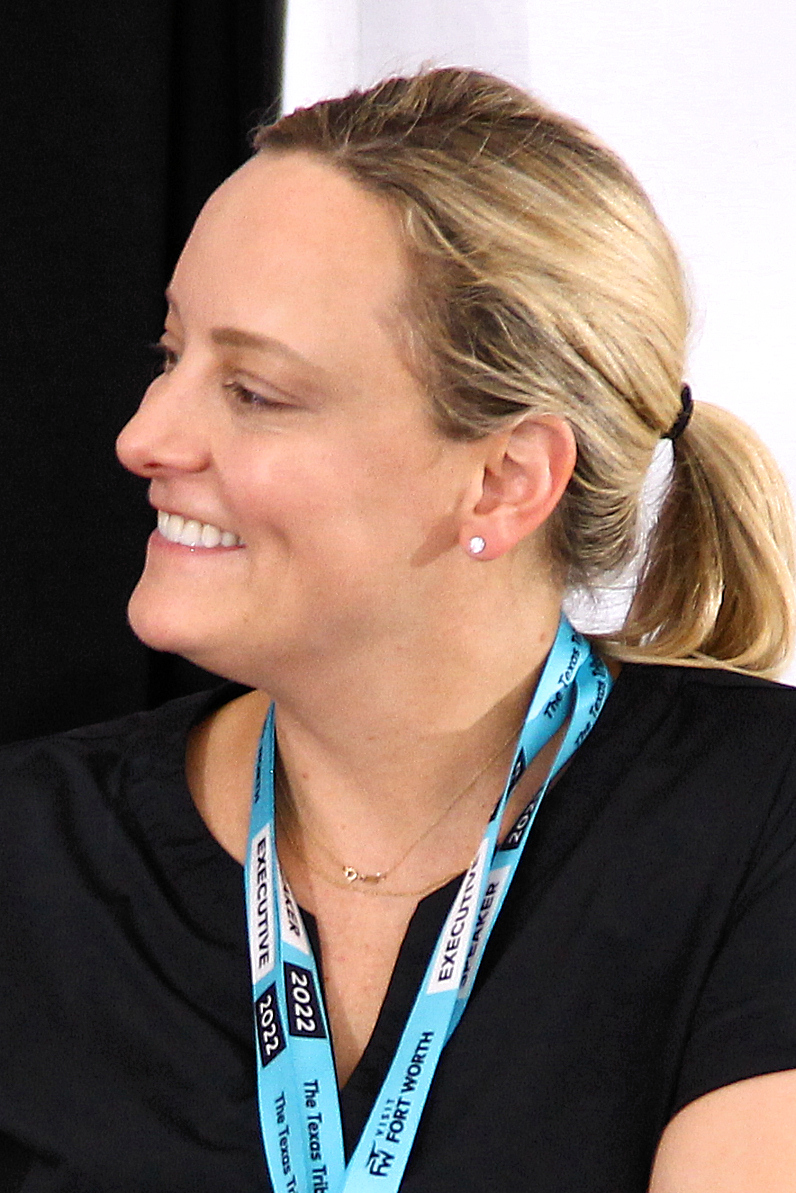
- Palmer in 2022
- Born: May 25, 1982 (age 44); Le Sueur, Minnesota, U.S.
- Other name: Anna Alda
- Education: St. Olaf College (BA)
- Occupation: Journalist
- Known for: Co-founder and CEO of Punchbowl News

Anna Palmer (born May 25, 1982) is an American political journalist based in Washington, D.C. She has been the co-founder and CEO of Punchbowl News since January 2021, and the host of the related Daily Punch Podcast. She was previously a reporter for Politico and became its senior Washington correspondent.

== Early life and education ==
Palmer was born, as Anna Alda, in Le Sueur, Minnesota and raised in North Dakota. She attended high school in Kindred, North Dakota, and served as a page for U.S. Senator Kent Conrad. She is a 2004 graduate of St. Olaf College, where she double-majored in political science and English, with a concentration in mass communications, and (starting in 2000) wrote for its newspaper, the Manitou Messenger, becoming its executive editor. Her multiple internships included a summer at the Washington, D.C. bureau of The New York Times.

== Career ==
=== Early career ===
After graduation, Palmer's first significant job was at the biweekly lobbying industry newsletter Influence. In 2005, working for the Legal Times, the parent company of Influence, she became one of the key journalists investigating the activities of lobbyist Jack Abramoff, who orchestrated a vast network of corruption, resulting in over three years in prison for Abramoff, and convictions of 20 others. Palmer's work on the case brought her first national notoriety.

In 2007, Palmer moved to Roll Call, a prominent Washington-insider newsletter.

=== At Politico ===
==== Initial work ====
In 2011, Palmer moved to Politico—a Washington political reporting journal.

==== Herman Cain revelation ====
In October of that year, she was one of the team of Politico reporters who investigated and reported on allegations against Republican presidential candidate Herman Cain, that—when he headed the National Restaurant Association in the 1990s—he had sexually harassed two female employees, and the lobbying organization had, in response, paid the women to resign and keep quiet about the matter.

Within a few weeks, two more cases were discovered by journalists, and a fifth woman alleged a long-time, recently-ended affair with Cain. The cumulative effect was blamed for Cain's sudden plunge in survey polls, and his early-December decision to suspend his campaign, less than a month and a half after Palmer's initial story broke.

==== Women Rule project ====
Among Palmer's other responsibilities at Politico, Palmer took the lead in Women Rule—a project focused on expanding leadership opportunities for women—becoming its Editorial Director. She also hosted Politico's Women Rule podcast.

==== Sherman partnership and Schock revelations ====
While at Politico, Palmer partnered with fellow journalist Jake Sherman, to cover political affairs in the capital, particularly the U.S. Congress. Palmer and Sherman have reported corruption among Democrats and Republicans. Their reporting on the spending habits of Illinois Congressman Aaron Schock reportedly led to his 2015 resignation.

==== Politico Playbook ====
From 2016 to 2020, the duo co-authored the Politico Playbook—a media franchise tracking the early Trump administration and its relations with the U.S. Congress. The duo tripled the platform's readership and doubled its revenue.

==== The Hill to Die On ====
In 2019, the duo also co-authored The Hill to Die On: The Battle for Congress and the Future of Trump’s America (a New York Times best-selling account of the Congressional politics of the early Trump presidency), which attracted extensive media attention.

The book drew attention to Palmer and Sherman, who then became the subject of numerous interview and discussion programs related to the themes of the book—in the news media, political/documentary media, and in the business-and-lobbying community.

=== At Punchbowl News ===
Palmer and Sherman departed Politico, together, in late 2020 to start Punchbowl News, an online news service focused on non-partisan reporting of power players, and inside events and leaders, in Congress and the Washington establishment — Palmer becoming Punchbowl's CEO.

=== Other involvements ===
Palmer has spoken or moderated discussions at the World Economic Forum, the United Nations General Assembly, the Milken Institute Global Forum, the Aspen Ideas Festival, the Texas Tribune Festival and SXSW.

Palmer has been a political commentator on CBS, NBC, ABC, Fox News, CNN, MSNBC, and PBS's Washington Week.

== Awards and recognition ==
- Spring 2019: "Top 10" (books) in "Politics & Current Events," (for "The Hill to Die On"), Publishers Weekly (list announced December, 2018)
- 2020: "Star to Watch," Washington Women in Journalism Awards
