= Clay Center Community High School =

Public high school in Clay Center, Kansas

Location
- 1630 9th St. Clay Center, Kansas 67432; United States
- Coordinates: 39.3863°N 97.1173°W

Information
- School type: Public, High School
- School district: Clay County USD 379
- CEEB code: 170570
- Teaching staff: 22.80 (FTE)
- Enrollment: 343 (2023-2024)
- Student to teacher ratio: 15.04
- Colors: Black and orange
- Mascot: Tiger
- Website: School website

Clay Center Community High School (CCCHS) is the public high school in Clay Center, Kansas at 1630 9th Street. It is operated by Clay County USD 379 school district. The school mascot is the tiger and the school colors are black and orange.

== Notable alumni ==
- Michael L. Printz (1937 - 1996), for whom the Michael L. Printz Award is named, librarian, graduated from the school in 1955.
- May Mailman, attorney
- Tracy Lee Claeys, football coach

== See also ==
- List of high schools in Kansas
- List of unified school districts in Kansas
