= Clay Center Carnegie Library =

Library in Clay Center, Kansas, US

- U.S. National Register of Historic Places
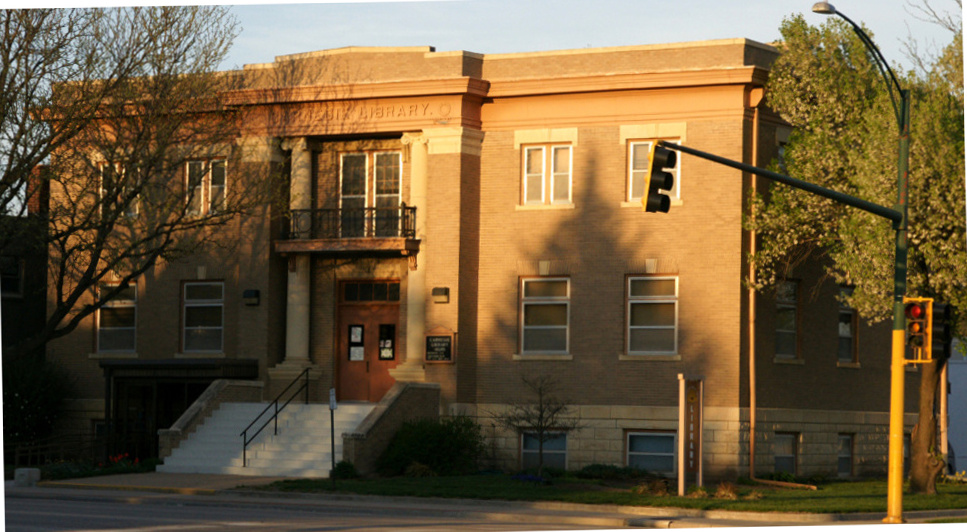

- Location within Kansas
- Location: 706 Sixth St., Clay Center, Kansas
- Coordinates: 39°22′36″N 97°07′26″W
- Area: less than one acre
- Built: 1912
- Built by: Sanneman Brothers
- Architect: Winter, H.B.
- Architectural style: Classical Revival
- MPS: Carnegie Libraries of Kansas TR
- NRHP reference No.: 87000933
- Added to NRHP: June 25, 1987

The Clay Center Carnegie Library in Clay Center, Kansas, is a Carnegie library built in 1912. It was listed on the National Register of Historic Places in 1987.

It is a two-story gray brick building, about 68 by 41 feet (21 m × 12 m) in plan.
