= Clay County USD 379 =

Public school district in Clay Center, Kansas

Address
- 807 Dexter St. Clay Center, Kansas, 67432; United States
- Coordinates: 39°22′42″N 97°7′12″W

District information
- Type: Public
- Grades: K to 12
- Schools: 5

Other information
- Website: usd379.org

Clay County USD 379 is a public unified school district headquartered in Clay Center, Kansas, United States. The district includes the communities of Clay Center, Green, Longford, Morganville, Oak Hill, Wakefield, Idana, Ladysmith, and nearby rural areas.

== Schools ==
The school district operates the following schools:

- Clay Center Community High School
- Clay Center Community Middle School
- Garfield Elementary School
- Lincoln Elementary School
- Wakefield K-12 School

=== Closed Schools ===
- Green Elementary School (closed In 2005)
- Longford Elementary School (closed in 2010)
- Morganville Elementary School (closed in 2006)

== See also ==
- Kansas State Department of Education
- Kansas State High School Activities Association
- List of high schools in Kansas
- List of unified school districts in Kansas
