= Jake Sherman (journalist) =

American journalist and writer (born 1985)

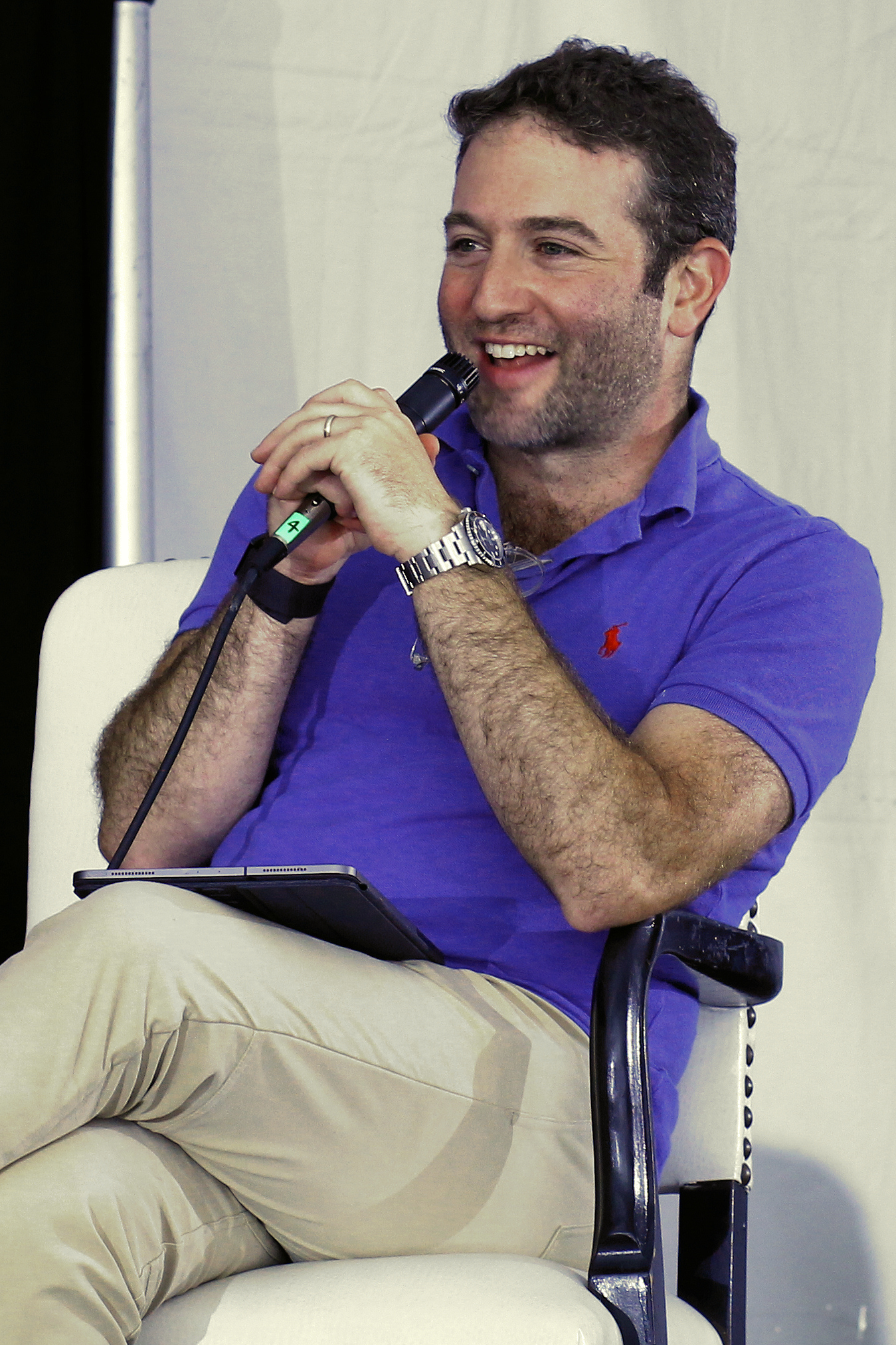
- Sherman in 2022
- Born: Jacob Scott Sherman; December 16, 1985 (age 40); Connecticut, U.S.
- Education: George Washington University (BA); Columbia University (MA)

Jacob Scott Sherman (born December 16, 1985) is an American journalist and writer. He is the co-founder of Punchbowl News, a daily newsletter service focusing on Congress. He is an NBC News and MSNBC political analyst. He previously worked for Politico, among other media outlets.

== Early life and education ==
Born in 1985, Sherman was raised in Stamford, Connecticut, where he attended a Jewish day school through 8th grade and then graduated from a public high school. He graduated from George Washington University where he was an editor at The GW Hatchet and Columbia University's Graduate School of Journalism, earning a master's degree from the latter. He is of Jewish descent.

== Career ==
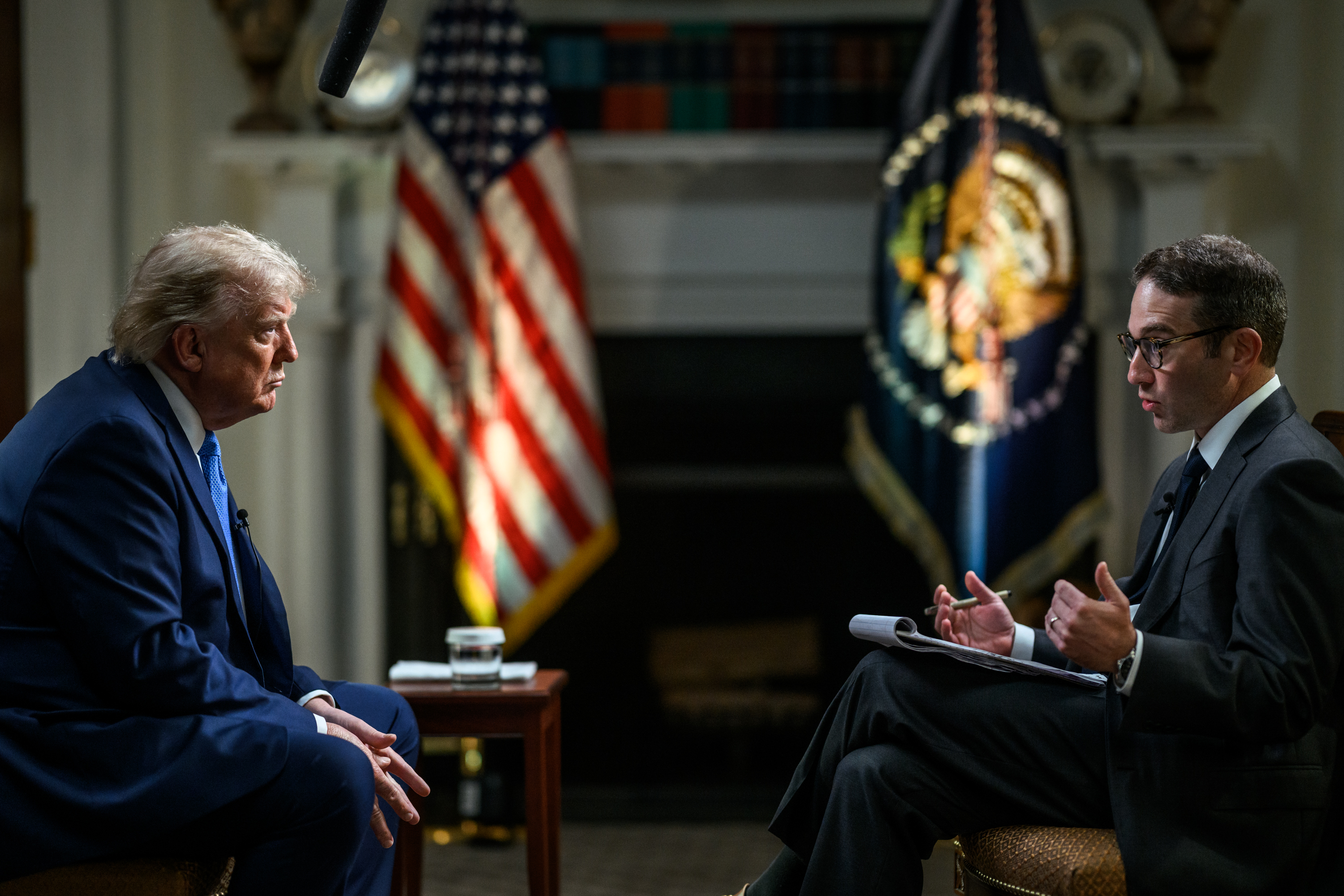
Sherman interviewing President Donald Trump in August 2026

Sherman was a senior writer for Politico and co-authored the Politico Playbook with Anna Palmer. He is also a political contributor for NBC and MSNBC. He co-wrote The Hill to Die On: The Battle for Congress and the Future of Trump's America.

In the late 2000s, he worked for The Wall Street Journal, Newsweek, and the Minneapolis Star Tribune, in their respective Washington, D.C., bureaus. He joined Politico in 2009 and was made co-editor of its Playbook newsletter in 2016, taking over from Michael Allen.

In 2016, The New York Times's Jim Rutenberg wrote that Sherman and his frequent writing partner Anna Palmer "helped break open the scandal that forced the resignation of Representative Aaron Schock of Illinois in 2015".

In October 2020, Sherman announced that he planned to leave Politico at the end of 2020, and to join Anna Palmer, Rachel Schindler and John Bresnahan in launching a daily newsletter in 2021 that would focus on Congress. Punchbowl News launched in January 2021.

== Personal life ==
Sherman married Irene Jefferson in 2015; they have two children. He speaks Hebrew.
