= Rachael Bade =

American journalist

- Bade in 2025
- Born: Tipp City, Ohio, U.S.
- Education: University of Dayton (BA)
- Occupation: Journalist
- Years active: 2010–present
- Employer(s): CNN, Politico, ABC News

Rachael Bade is an American journalist. She was Politico's Senior Washington Correspondent and author of the morning newsletter, Playbook. She served as ABC News Contributing Political Correspondent as well, appearing on This Week, Good Morning America and the network's streaming platform.

A member of the congressional press corps for over a decade, Bade is also the author of Unchecked: The Untold Story Behind Congress's Botched Impeachments of Donald Trump, a book that blames Democrats as much as Republicans for the failed impeachments of Trump. Published by William Morrow and co-written with her one-time colleague Karoun Demirjian, her book won plaudits from The Washington Post, The Wall Street Journal, and The Guardian, among others.

== Early life and education ==
Bade was born and raised in Tipp City, Ohio and received a BA in political science and journalism from the University of Dayton in 2010. Before her journalism career, she was a classical ballet dancer, training during summers with Pacific Northwest Ballet, Ballet Austin and American Ballet Theatre.

== Career ==
Bade started her journalism career in 2010 as a reporter for Congressional Quarterly and Roll Call. She joined Politico in 2012 to cover tax policy, a beat that launched her career when the IRS tea party targeting controversy broke. Bade covered the House Republican investigation of the IRS's scrutinization of conservative tax-exempt groups and was the only reporter to interview Lois Lerner, the IRS leader at the heart of the scandal who asserted her Fifth Amendment right to Congress, refusing to answer investigators' questions.

Bade later covered the Republican Party's investigation of the 2012 Benghazi terrorist attack and the party's subsequent probe of Hillary Clinton's private email use ahead of the 2016 election. She was promoted to Politico's Congress team in early 2016, where she covered the GOP's transformation under Donald Trump from her perch on the Hill, specializing in stories about Republican infighting about the direction of the party.

She won an award for her coverage of Speaker Paul Ryan, who, she writes, was torn between a desire to land policy wins and a private concern about Trump's moral compass.

Bade joined The Washington Post as a congressional reporter in 2019 to cover House Democrats' oversight of the Trump administration. She helped lead the publication's coverage of the Trump impeachment inquiry before starting on her book, Unchecked.

News from her book, as well as excerpts therein, appeared in The Washington Post, Politico Magazine, The Atlantic, Fox News, Playbook, and multiple other publications.

In November 2025, Bade, after four years writing POLITICO's Playbook newsletter, left to start a project with Sean Spicer and Dan Turrentine.

== Personal life ==
She lives in Alexandria, Virginia, with her husband Alex. In February 2022, Bade announced that she was expecting a baby girl in the summer of 2022 after undergoing five rounds of in vitro fertilization.
