= Politico =

American digital newspaper company

- Industry: News
- Founded: January 23, 2007; 19 years ago (as The Politico)
- Headquarters: Arlington County, Virginia, U.S.
- Key people: Goli Sheikholeslami (Chief Executive Officer); Dari Gessner (Chief Operating Officer); John Harris (editor-in-chief)
- Products: Politico (newspaper); Politico.com (website); Politico Europe (newspaper); Politico.EU (website); POLITICOPro.com (subscription service); POLITICOPro.EU (subscription service)
- Owner: Axel Springer SE
- Number of employees: 1,100 as of January 2024 (700+ in North America, 375 in Europe)
- Website: www.politico.com

Politico (stylized as POLITICO in all caps), known originally as The Politico, is an American political digital newspaper company founded by American banker and media executive Robert Allbritton in 2007. Politico covers politics and public policy in the United States and internationally, including news coverage in the U.S., European Union, United Kingdom, and Canada. Primarily providing distributed news, analysis, and opinion online, it also produces printed newspapers, radio, and podcasts. Politico's coverage focuses on topics such as the federal government, lobbying, campaign finance, and the media.

In 2021, Politico was acquired by Axel Springer SE, a German news publisher and media company, for more than $1 billion. Axel Springer's CEO Mathias Döpfner said that Politico employees would be required to adhere to the company's principles of support for Israel, support for a united Europe, and a free-market economy. In 2025, a group of Politico employees won a landmark case against the firm's use of AI tools and its launch of two AI-based products.

== History ==
=== Origins, style, and growth ===
Politico was founded in 2007 to focus on politics with fast-paced Internet reporting in granular detail, comparable to the sports analysis of SportsCenter or ESPN. John F. Harris and Jim VandeHei left The Washington Post to become Politico's editor-in-chief and executive editor, respectively. With the financial backing of Robert L. Allbritton, the pair launched the website on January 23, 2007. Their first hire was Mike Allen, a writer for Time magazine, and Frederick J. Ryan Jr. was its first president and chief executive officer. Martin Tolchin was another member of the editorial founding team.

From the beginning, journalists covering political campaigns for Politico carried a video camera to each assignment, and they were encouraged to promote their work elsewhere. By 2008, Politico received more than three million unique visits per month. In September 2008, The New York Times reported that Politico would expand its operations following the 2008 U.S. presidential election, and that "after Election Day, [Politico] will add reporters, editors, Web engineers and other employees; expand circulation of its newspaper edition in Washington; and print more often." Between the 2008 and 2012 elections, Politico's staff more than tripled in size. Notable additions included two political commentators, Michael Kinsley and Joe Scarborough, as opinion writers.

In 2009, the web pages shortened their name from The Politico to more simply Politico. In 2011, Politico began to focus more on long-form journalism and news analysis. This shift in coverage received further support in June 2013 with the hiring of Susan Glasser to oversee "opinion from prominent outside voices" and "long-form storytelling". In September 2014, Glasser was tapped to be Politico's new editor, following the resignation of Richard Berke the previous month. VandeHei was named Politico's new CEO in October 2013. Under his leadership, Politico continued to grow: in 2014 alone, it expanded revenues by 25%. By 2016, Politico had nearly 500 employees worldwide.

Amidst reports of tensions, VandeHei and Allen announced that they would leave Politico after the 2016 presidential election, but left far sooner. Allbritton, then Executive Chairman and owner, was named acting CEO in Vandehei's stead. Several months after their departure, Washingtonian Magazine reported that the relationship ultimately deteriorated during a series of events including VandeHei pushing Allbritton to sell the company, and Allbritton losing faith in VandeHei's abilities as a CEO.

Investment banker Patrick Steel was CEO between 2017 and 2021. He departed the company in early 2021 after four years. Goli Sheikholeslami, who had been the CEO of WNYC public radio, was announced as CEO by new owner Axel Springer in January 2022 and tasked with leading operations of both Politico and Politico Europe. Dafna Linzer, who had been at MSNBC and NBC News, was named as the new executive editor in March 2022. She departed in 2023 after a year in the role.

=== Global expansion ===
In September 2014, Politico formed a joint venture with German publisher Axel Springer SE to launch its European edition, based in Brussels. In December 2014, the joint venture announced its acquisition of Development Institute International, a leading French events content provider, and European Voice, a European political newspaper, to be re-launched under the Politico brand. Politico Europe debuted in print on April 23, 2015.

Politico.eu, the publication's Brussels-based European operation, was formally launched in 2015. In early 2016, it had about 50 editorial employees and two dozen business employees. A third-party survey published at the time ranked Politico.eu as most widely read news organization among 249 Brussels "influencers" surveyed, although the same panel found it less influential than The Financial Times, BBC, and The Economist.

Stephen Brown, who was named editor-in-chief of Politico Europe in September 2019, died suddenly of a heart attack on March 18, 2021. Jamil Anderlini, previously Asia Editor of the Financial Times, was named Editor-in-Chief of Politico Europe in July 2021. In late 2024 it was announced that Anderlini would move into the role of Regional Director of Politico's European operation. Kate Day was appointed Senior Executive Editor of the European operation of Politico in late 2024.

In December 2020, Politico acquired E&E News, an energy and environment-focused publication that targets government agencies, think tanks, and corporations. The terms of the acquisition were not made public.

=== Focus on investigations ===
Under Glasser and successor Carrie Budoff Brown, Politico expanded its focus on investigating Washington policymakers. A series of stories by Sherman and Palmer in 2015 "helped break open the scandal that forced the resignation of Representative Aaron Schock of Illinois in 2015", according to The New York Times. Reporter Marianne Levine in 2017 "helped bring down Trump's Labor Secretary pick", Andy Puzder, after breaking the story that Puzder's ex-wife had accused him of spousal abuse, according to the Poynter Institute. Puzder withdrew his nomination after the story.

In September 2017, reporters Rachana Pradhan and Dan Diamond authored a "bombshell" investigation of how President Donald Trump's health secretary, Tom Price, was flying on charter jets paid for by taxpayers, according to The Washington Post. Price resigned after the stories. The "indispensable" stories published by Politico under Budoff Brown in 2017 helped it "get its groove back," according to the Washingtonian's Andrew Beaujon. Politico reporter Alex Thompson in February 2022 broke the "bombshell report" of how Eric Lander, President Joe Biden's science adviser, had been "demeaning" colleagues in the office, according to Endpoints News. Lander resigned after the story.

=== Acquisition by Axel Springer ===
In October 2021, the large German publishing and media firm Axel Springer SE announced that it had completed the acquisition of Politico for over $1 billion. The closing took place in late October 2021. The new owners said they would add staff, and at some point, put the publication's news content behind a paywall. Axel Springer's Chief Executive Mathias Döpfner said that Politico staff would need to adhere to Axel Springer's principles, including support for a united Europe and Israel's right to exist, advocate the transatlantic alliance between the United States of America and Europe and a free-market economy, and that staff who disagree with the principles "should not work for Axel Springer, very clearly". Axel Springer said that they would not require Politico employees to sign documents in support of a transatlantic alliance or Israel, though this policy is enforced at German newspaper Bild, another Axel Springer subsidiary.

In September 2022, Politico published an exposé critical of NGO leadership at the helm of the worldwide COVID-19 pandemic response, written in cooperation with the German newspaper Die Welt, another Axel Springer property. In May 2025, Argentine entrepreneur and Axel Springer board member Martín Varsavsky resigned after accusing Politico of left-wing bias. Varsavsky cited Politico’s news coverage of Israel during the Gaza war.

=== Supreme Court leak ===
On May 2, 2022, Politico obtained and released a 98-page draft document indicating that the Supreme Court was poised to strike down the landmark Roe v. Wade decision that legalized abortion nationwide, as well as Planned Parenthood v. Casey, in its ruling on Dobbs v. Jackson Women's Health Organization. Chief Justice John Roberts directed the marshal of the Court to conduct an investigation into the source of the leak. The story became the most-trafficked in the publisher's history, with 11 million views by May 6. Politico's first tweet on the report gained more than triple the impressions it normally saw in an entire month on Twitter.

=== Loss of workstation at the Pentagon ===
On January 31, 2025, a Defense Department memo announced that Politico must move out of its longtime workspace on the Correspondents' Corridor in the Pentagon, a move under a new Annual Media Rotation Program for the Pentagon Press Corps.

=== Use of artificial intelligence ===
In 2024, Politico published AI-generated news summaries of major American political events such as the Democratic National Convention and the presidential debates. Wired reported that Politico's AI tool had fabricated quotes, misspelled names and used language that violated Politico's editorial standards, including the use of terms such as "criminal migrants". The errors were later taken down without a correction from an editor.

In September 2024, Politico announced a partnership with Y Combinator-backed startup Capital AI to produce an AI tool to summarize its journalism for Politico Pro subscribers. In March 2025, Politico unveiled Policy Intelligence Assistant, a suite of AI tools for use by paying subscribers. Executive Rachel Loeffler described the initiative as "seamlessly integrating generative AI with our unmatched policy expertise."

The tools were criticized by the Communications Workers of America (CWA) representing journalists at Politico and E&E News for violating the terms of their contract, which states that Politico's management must give its journalists 60 days' notice prior to rolling out AI products which "materially and substantively" affect their duties. Employees also launched a "News Not Slop" campaign, seeking AI safeguards. In July 2025, CWA took Politico's leadership to arbitration. Later that year, the arbitrator found that Politico's management team violated key AI adoption safeguards.

== Publications ==
=== Politico Playbook ===
On June 25, 2007, Mike Allen launched Politico Playbook, a daily early-morning email newsletter. Within a few years, the newsletter had attained a large readership amongst members of the D.C. community. By 2016, over 100,000 people—including "insiders, outsiders, lobbyists and journalists, governors, senators, presidents and would-be presidents"—read Playbook daily. Multiple commentators credit Allen and Playbook with strongly influencing the substance and tone of the rest of the national political news cycle.

Daniel Lippman joined Politico in June 2014, in large part to assist Allen with Playbook. Upon Allen's departure in July 2016 to start Axios, Anna Palmer and Jake Sherman joined Lippman to assume Playbook-writing duties. In March 2017, Politico announced the creation of a second, mid-day edition of Playbook—entitled "Playbook Power Briefing"—written by the same people who authored the morning edition.

In 2017, a weekly sponsorship of Playbook cost between $50,000 and $60,000. After Palmer and Sherman left to found Punchbowl News, Politico announced a new team of Playbook authors in 2021, including Rachael Bade, Ryan Lizza, Tara Palmeri and Eugene Daniels. Mike Debonis, previously of the Washington Post, was hired as editor of Politico Playbook in 2022. In April, 2022, Palmeri left Politico after being moved off of Playbook.

=== Politico Pro ===
Politico Pro, a paid subscription news service, launched in 2010. Politico Pro covers about a dozen topics. Subscription costs are determined by licenses and topic area (verticals), with the costs in the high four figures to high six figures depending on the scope of the subscription. As of 2015, Politico Pro had a 93% subscription renewal rate, and provided about half of Politico's overall revenue. During fiscal year 2024, the U.S. federal government paid about $8 million for subscriptions to Politico Pro and other Politico services.

=== Politico Magazine ===
The Politico, February 15, 2007

In November 2013, Politico launched Politico Magazine (ISSN 2381-1595), which is published online and bimonthly in print. In contrast to Politico's focus on "politics and policy scoops" and breaking news, Politico Magazine focuses on "high-impact, magazine-style reporting", such as long-form journalism. The first editor of Politico Magazine was Susan Glasser, who came to the publication from Foreign Policy magazine.

After Glasser was promoted to become Politico's editor, Garrett Graff was named editor of the magazine. He was followed by Blake Hounshell (2016–2018), and Stephen Heuser (2019–2022). In September, 2022, Elizabeth Ralph was named editor of POLITICO Magazine, now solely a digital publication.

=== Protocol ===
In February 2020, Robert Allbritton, the then owner of Politico, launched Protocol, a tech news website focused on the "people, power and politics of tech." The site focused on how to "arm decision-makers in tech, business and public policy" with important global technology news. It operated as a separate company and with separate business and editorial management than Politico. It was shut down at the end of 2022 after struggling to meet revenue goals.

=== State editions ===
In September 2013, Politico acquired the online news site Capital New York, which also operated separate departments covering Florida and New Jersey. In April 2015, Politico announced its intention to rebrand the state feeds with the Politico name (Politico Florida, Politico New Jersey, and Politico New York) to expand its coverage of state politics. In September 2018, Politico announced it would launch Politico California Pro.

=== E&E News ===
E&E News is a Politico-owned publication that covers energy and the environment, as well as pertinent climate and natural resource policy news. E&E News includes five publications: Climatewire, E&E Daily, Energywire, Greenwire, and E&E News PM. It was acquired by Politico in 2020. Since the acquisition, Politico has integrated E&E News into its Politico Pro platform; select content from E&E News publications can be accessed through either the E&E News or Politico Pro websites.

== Staff ==
In June 2024, several top Politico reporters left the company. In February 2025, Editor-in-Chief John Harris announced the latest changes in the newsroom's leadership, including the following appointments:

- Joseph Schatz, Deputy Editor-in-Chief
- Alex Burns, Senior Executive Editor, US
- Kate Day, Senior Executive Editor, Europe

On March 29, 2026, Politico announced the appointment of Jonathan Greenberger, who has been its executive vice president since 2024, as its next global editor. He will replace John Harris from May, 1.

== Controversies ==
=== Unverified report ===
In January 2022, Politico Playbook incorrectly reported that United States Supreme Court justice Sonia Sotomayor had been seen having dinner with leading Democrats, after Sotomayor earlier having claimed that she could not appear in person for oral arguments at the court. It later turned out that Politico had mistaken Chuck Schumer's wife Iris Weinshall for Sotomayor, who had not been at the dinner, and Politico had not verified the report.

=== Coverage of Donald Trump ===
During the 2016 United States presidential election, Cambridge Analytica, a British political consulting firm, targeted pro-Donald Trump voters and anti-Hillary Clinton voters with native advertising and sponsored or branded content on Politico.

On January 14, 2021, conservative commentator Ben Shapiro was featured as a guest writer for Politico's Playbook newsletter, where he defended Republicans in the U.S. House of Representatives who opposed the second impeachment of Donald Trump. The newsletter drew backlash from Politico staffers. Matthew Kaminski, editor in chief of Politico, declined to apologize and defended the decision to publish the article, stating: "We're not going to back away from having published something because some people think it was a mistake to do so." He added that the newspaper "stands by every word" in the article. According to The Daily Beast, more than 100 Politico staffers signed onto a letter to publisher Robert Allbritton criticizing Politico's decision to feature Shapiro's article and the response from Kaminski.

In 2024, Politico was handed leaked confidential materials from the Trump presidential campaign. Politico confirmed that the documents were authentic but refused to report on their contents. The Associated Press wrote that the decision by Politico to not report on the Trump campaign leaks stands "in marked contrast" to Politico's extensive reporting on the leaked email communications of Hillary's 2016 campaign manager, John Podesta.

In 2026, President Trump denied Politico entry the White House, accusing it spreading fake news unfavorable to Trump.

=== Fossil fuel advertising ===
An investigation by The Intercept, The Nation, and DeSmog found that Politico is one of the leading media outlets that publishes advertising for the fossil fuel industry while failing to adequately distinguish between independent journalism and native advertising. Journalists who cover climate change for Politico are concerned that conflicts of interest with the companies and industries that cause climate change, obstruct action, and engage in greenwashing through sponsored content will reduce the credibility of their reporting on climate change and cause readers to be misinformed.

=== Coverage of the Gaza War ===
In April 2026, Politico staff sent a letter to incoming global editor-in-chief Jonathan Greenberger warning that Axel Springer chief executive Mathias Döpfner's use of the outlet to promote his personal views on the Gaza war risked "undermining [Politico's] reputation as an impartial news source." The letter cited two op-eds Döpfner had written for Politico Magazine, one urging European support for the U.S. and Israel in their conflict with Iran and another criticizing European aid to Palestinians. At a subsequent staff call, Döpfner defended the op-eds, where he reiterated that Axel Springer's pro-Israel principles are "non-negotiable” and that employees uncomfortable with them should consider resigning.

== Distribution and content ==
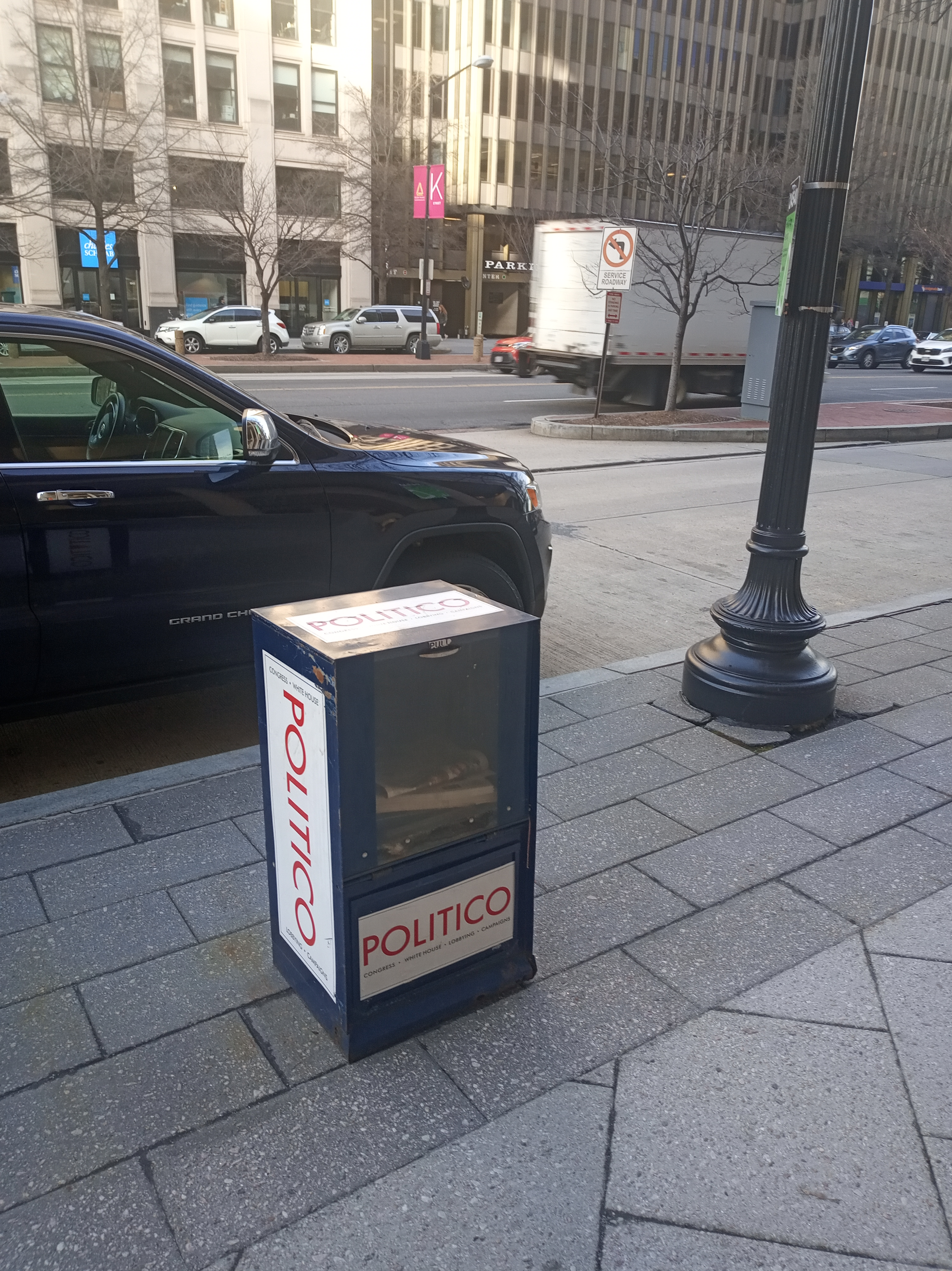
Vending box for the print edition of Politico on Washington DC's K Street

As of 2017, Politico claimed to average 26 million unique visitors a month to its American website, and more than 1.5 million unique visitors to its European site. Following the acquisition of the company by Axel Springer SE, Haaretz and Fairness & Accuracy in Reporting reported that Politico would enforce a policy on employees requiring them to acknowledge Israel's right to exist.

The print newspaper had a circulation of approximately 32,000 in 2009, distributed free in Washington, D.C., and Manhattan. The newspaper prints up to five issues a week while Congress is in session and sometimes publishes one issue a week when Congress is in recess. It carries advertising, including full-page ads from trade associations and a "help wanted" section listing political and public policy jobs in the Washington, D.C. area.

== Influence ==
Multiple commentators have credited Politico's original organizational philosophy—namely, prioritizing scoops and publishing large numbers of stories—with forcing other, more-established publications to make a number of changes, such as increasing their pace of production and changing their tone. Other outlets, including Axios and Punchbowl News, were started by former Politico employees.

== Awards and recognition ==
Politico won a Pulitzer Prize in 2012, for Matt Wuerker's editorial cartoons. Politico also has won four George Polk Awards, the first in 2014 for Rania Abouzeid's investigation of the rise of the Islamic State, the second in 2019 for Helena Bottemiller Evich's investigation of the Trump administration's efforts to bury its climate change plans, the third in 2020 for Dan Diamond's investigation of political interference in the U.S. federal government's response to the COVID-19 pandemic, and the fourth in 2022 for Josh Gerstein, Alex Ward, Peter Canellos, and the staff of Politico for revealing a draft of the Supreme Court opinion overturning Roe v. Wade.

== See also ==
- List of newspapers in Washington, D.C.
