= Clay Center, Kansas =

City in Clay County, Kansas

- City and county seat
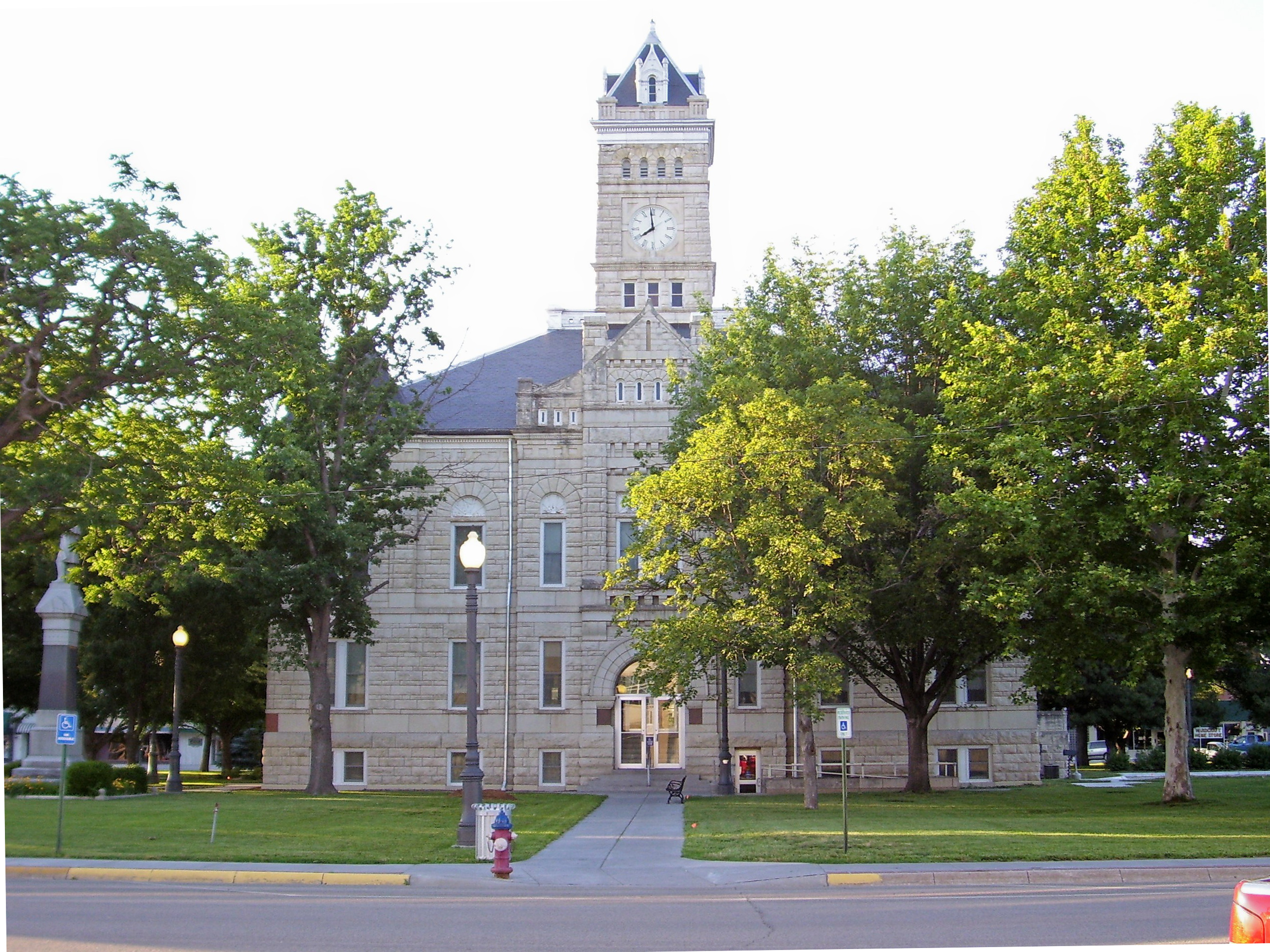
- Clay County Courthouse (2006)

- Location within Clay County and Kansas

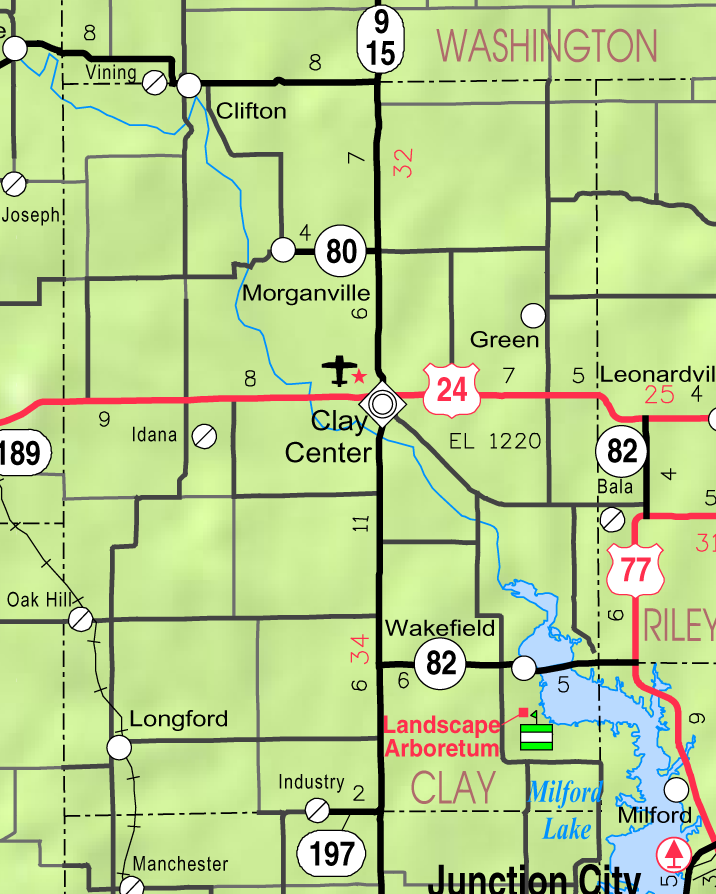
- KDOT map of Clay County (legend)
- Coordinates: 39°22′48″N 97°07′23″W
- Country: United States
- State: Kansas
- County: Clay
- Founded: 1862
- Incorporated: 1875

Government
  - Mayor: James Thatcher

Area
  - Total: 3.19 sq mi (8.27 km^{2})
  - Land: 3.19 sq mi (8.26 km^{2})
  - Water: 0.0039 sq mi (0.01 km^{2})
- Elevation: 1,204 ft (367 m)

Population (2020)
  - Total: 4,199
  - Density: 1,320/sq mi (508/km^{2})
- Time zone: UTC-6 (CST)
  - Summer (DST): UTC-5 (CDT)
- ZIP Code: 67432
- Area code: 785
- FIPS code: 20-13625
- GNIS ID: 485555
- Website: cityofclaycenter.com

Clay Center is a city in and the county seat of Clay County, Kansas, United States. As of the 2020 census, the population of the city was 4,199.

== History ==
Clay Center was first settled in 1862. It was named from its position near the geographical center of Clay County.

The first post office was established in Clay Center on July 3, 1862.

Clay Center was located on the Chicago, Rock Island and Pacific and Union Pacific Railroads.

== Geography ==
According to the United States Census Bureau, the city has a total area of 3.08 square miles (7.98 km^{2}), all land. Clay Center is unique, because it is the geographic midpoint between Los Angeles, California and New York City, the two largest American cities. Both cities are exactly 1,224 mi (1,970 km) from Clay Center.

=== Climate ===
The climate in this area is characterized by hot, humid summers and generally mild to cool winters. According to the Köppen Climate Classification system, Clay Center has a hot-summer humid continental climate, abbreviated "Dfa" on climate maps.

Climate data for Clay Center, Kansas, 1991–2020 normals, extremes 1902–present
| Month | Jan | Feb | Mar | Apr | May | Jun | Jul | Aug | Sep | Oct | Nov | Dec | Year |
|---|---|---|---|---|---|---|---|---|---|---|---|---|---|
| Record high °F (°C) | 77 (25) | 85 (29) | 93 (34) | 99 (37) | 105 (41) | 116 (47) | 116 (47) | 117 (47) | 111 (44) | 101 (38) | 88 (31) | 76 (24) | 117 (47) |
| Mean maximum °F (°C) | 61.5 (16.4) | 68.1 (20.1) | 79.1 (26.2) | 85.9 (29.9) | 92.2 (33.4) | 97.9 (36.6) | 102.3 (39.1) | 101.1 (38.4) | 95.9 (35.5) | 87.8 (31.0) | 73.3 (22.9) | 63.6 (17.6) | 103.6 (39.8) |
| Mean daily maximum °F (°C) | 38.7 (3.7) | 43.7 (6.5) | 55.3 (12.9) | 65.7 (18.7) | 75.7 (24.3) | 86.0 (30.0) | 91.1 (32.8) | 88.6 (31.4) | 80.8 (27.1) | 68.2 (20.1) | 53.4 (11.9) | 41.6 (5.3) | 65.7 (18.7) |
| Daily mean °F (°C) | 28.3 (−2.1) | 32.5 (0.3) | 43.1 (6.2) | 53.4 (11.9) | 64.5 (18.1) | 74.9 (23.8) | 79.8 (26.6) | 77.2 (25.1) | 68.9 (20.5) | 55.9 (13.3) | 42.1 (5.6) | 31.5 (−0.3) | 54.3 (12.4) |
| Mean daily minimum °F (°C) | 17.8 (−7.9) | 21.3 (−5.9) | 30.8 (−0.7) | 41.2 (5.1) | 53.4 (11.9) | 63.7 (17.6) | 68.4 (20.2) | 65.8 (18.8) | 56.9 (13.8) | 43.6 (6.4) | 30.9 (−0.6) | 21.4 (−5.9) | 42.9 (6.1) |
| Mean minimum °F (°C) | −1.1 (−18.4) | 3.7 (−15.7) | 12.9 (−10.6) | 26.0 (−3.3) | 38.1 (3.4) | 51.3 (10.7) | 57.0 (13.9) | 55.1 (12.8) | 41.5 (5.3) | 26.6 (−3.0) | 15.4 (−9.2) | 4.0 (−15.6) | −4.7 (−20.4) |
| Record low °F (°C) | −23 (−31) | −35 (−37) | −15 (−26) | 7 (−14) | 21 (−6) | 39 (4) | 45 (7) | 38 (3) | 25 (−4) | 13 (−11) | −6 (−21) | −24 (−31) | −35 (−37) |
| Average precipitation inches (mm) | 0.72 (18) | 1.09 (28) | 1.94 (49) | 2.83 (72) | 4.90 (124) | 4.50 (114) | 3.98 (101) | 4.13 (105) | 2.89 (73) | 2.24 (57) | 1.49 (38) | 1.14 (29) | 31.85 (808) |
| Average snowfall inches (cm) | 3.1 (7.9) | 2.0 (5.1) | 0.8 (2.0) | 0.6 (1.5) | 0.0 (0.0) | 0.0 (0.0) | 0.0 (0.0) | 0.0 (0.0) | 0.0 (0.0) | 0.2 (0.51) | 0.9 (2.3) | 3.2 (8.1) | 10.8 (27.41) |
| Average precipitation days (≥ 0.01 in) | 3.9 | 4.3 | 5.7 | 7.9 | 10.1 | 8.4 | 8.5 | 8.1 | 6.3 | 6.1 | 4.8 | 3.8 | 77.9 |
| Average snowy days (≥ 0.1 in) | 1.9 | 1.7 | 0.7 | 0.2 | 0.0 | 0.0 | 0.0 | 0.0 | 0.0 | 0.2 | 0.6 | 1.6 | 6.9 |
Source 1: NOAA
Source 2: National Weather Service

== Demographics ==
Historical population
| Census | Pop. | Note | %± |
|---|---|---|---|
| 1880 | 1,753 | | — |
| 1890 | 2,802 | | 59.8% |
| 1900 | 3,069 | | 9.5% |
| 1910 | 3,438 | | 12.0% |
| 1920 | 3,715 | | 8.1% |
| 1930 | 4,386 | | 18.1% |
| 1940 | 4,518 | | 3.0% |
| 1950 | 4,528 | | 0.2% |
| 1960 | 4,613 | | 1.9% |
| 1970 | 4,963 | | 7.6% |
| 1980 | 4,948 | | −0.3% |
| 1990 | 4,613 | | −6.8% |
| 2000 | 4,564 | | −1.1% |
| 2010 | 4,334 | | −5.0% |
| 2020 | 4,199 | | −3.1% |
U.S. Decennial Census

=== 2020 census ===
As of the 2020 census, Clay Center had 4,199 people, 1,809 households, and 1,116 families. The population density was 1,315.9 per square mile (508.1/km^{2}). There were 2,103 housing units at an average density of 659.0 per square mile (254.5/km^{2}).

The median age was 43.9 years. 23.0% of residents were under the age of 18, 5.4% were from 18 to 24, 22.7% were from 25 to 44, 23.8% were from 45 to 64, and 25.1% were 65 years of age or older. For every 100 females there were 93.9 males, and for every 100 females age 18 and over there were 91.6 males age 18 and over.

98.4% of residents lived in urban areas, while 1.6% lived in rural areas.

Of the 1,809 households, 26.4% had children under the age of 18 living in them. 48.2% were married-couple households, 18.6% were households with a male householder and no spouse or partner present, and 27.8% were households with a female householder and no spouse or partner present. About 34.8% of all households were made up of individuals, and 18.9% had someone living alone who was 65 years of age or older. The average household size was 2.0 and the average family size was 2.7.

There were 2,103 housing units, of which 14.0% were vacant. The homeowner vacancy rate was 4.5% and the rental vacancy rate was 20.9%.

Racial composition as of the 2020 census
| Race | Number | Percent |
|---|---|---|
| White | 3,889 | 92.62% |
| Black or African American | 36 | 0.86% |
| American Indian and Alaska Native | 33 | 0.79% |
| Asian | 33 | 0.79% |
| Native Hawaiian and Other Pacific Islander | 0 | 0.0% |
| Some other race | 41 | 0.98% |
| Two or more races | 167 | 3.98% |
| Hispanic or Latino (of any race) | 127 | 3.02% |

The non-Hispanic white population was 91.86%.

=== Demographic estimates ===
The percent of those with a bachelor's degree or higher was estimated to be 15.7% of the population.

=== Income and poverty ===
The 2016–2020 5-year American Community Survey estimates show that the median household income was $43,191 (with a margin of error of +/- $6,863) and the median family income was $67,677 (+/- $6,899). Males had a median income of $45,605 (+/- $9,734) versus $21,250 (+/- $3,104) for females. The median income for those above 16 years old was $33,169 (+/- $2,538). Approximately, 8.9% of families and 7.4% of the population were below the poverty line, including 5.8% of those under the age of 18 and 1.2% of those ages 65 or over.

=== 2010 census ===
As of the census of 2010, there were 4,334 people, 1,920 households, and 1,172 families living in the city. The population density was 1,407.1 inhabitants per square mile (543.3/km^{2}). There were 2,158 housing units at an average density of 700.6 per square mile (270.5/km^{2}). The racial makeup of the city was 96.9% White, 0.5% African American, 0.6% Native American, 0.3% Asian, 0.4% from other races, and 1.3% from two or more races. Hispanic or Latino people of any race were 1.8% of the population.

There were 1,920 households, of which 27.0% had children under the age of 18 living with them, 48.8% were married couples living together, 8.2% had a female householder with no husband present, 4.0% had a male householder with no wife present, and 39.0% were non-families. 35.0% of all households were made up of individuals, and 20.1% had someone living alone who was 65 years of age or older. The average household size was 2.21 and the average family size was 2.82.

The median age in the city was 44.5 years. 22.5% of residents were under the age of 18; 6.6% were between the ages of 18 and 24; 21.4% were from 25 to 44; 25.8% were from 45 to 64; and 23.7% were 65 years of age or older. The gender makeup of the city was 48.6% male and 51.4% female.

== Arts and culture ==
The Piotique Festival is an annual pioneer and antique festival, featuring food, crafts, activities, live entertainment, and dancing.

== Government ==
The Clay Center government consists of a mayor and eight council members, which meets twice a month.

== Education ==
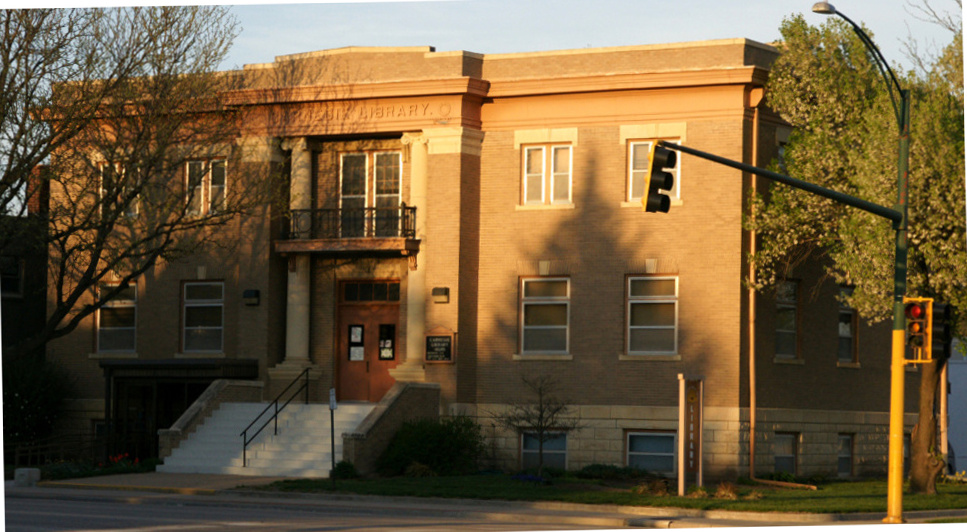
Clay Center Carnegie Library (2015)

The community is served by Clay County USD 379 public school district, and Clay Center Community High School.

The Clay Center Carnegie Library is the public library for this community.

== Notable people ==
- Herb Bradley, professional baseball player
- Tracy Claeys, Washington State football defensive coordinator and former University of Minnesota football head coach
- Warren Henry Cole, surgeon who pioneered X-ray use in medicine
- George Docking, former governor of Kansas
- Steve Doocy, host for Fox News, Fox & Friends TV talk show; author
- Tenney Frank, noted scholar and historian
- Nicole Ohlde, basketball player and WNBA player
- Otto D. Unruh, two-time Bethel College football coach and 21-year coaching career at Clay Center Kansas High School
- William D. Vincent, United States Representative
