= Email controversy =

The terms email controversy or email scandal might refer to any of the following:

- Okinawa email controversy, US Military (2001)
- Climatic Research Unit email controversy, International science (2001)
- Bush White House email controversy, US politics (2007)
- Lee Abrams email controversy, US media (2010)
- Hillary Clinton email controversy, US politics (2015)
- Shiva Ayyadurai email controversy, US media (2016)
