= Clinton scandal =

Clinton scandal may refer to:

- Clinton–Lewinsky scandal (1998), involving U.S. President Bill Clinton and his sex scandal with intern Monica Lewinsky
- Hillary Clinton email controversy (2015–2016), in which U.S. presidential candidate Hillary Clinton was found to have used unsecured, unofficial computer channels to transmit classified email
