= Likeability trap =

Campaign tactic, often targeting women

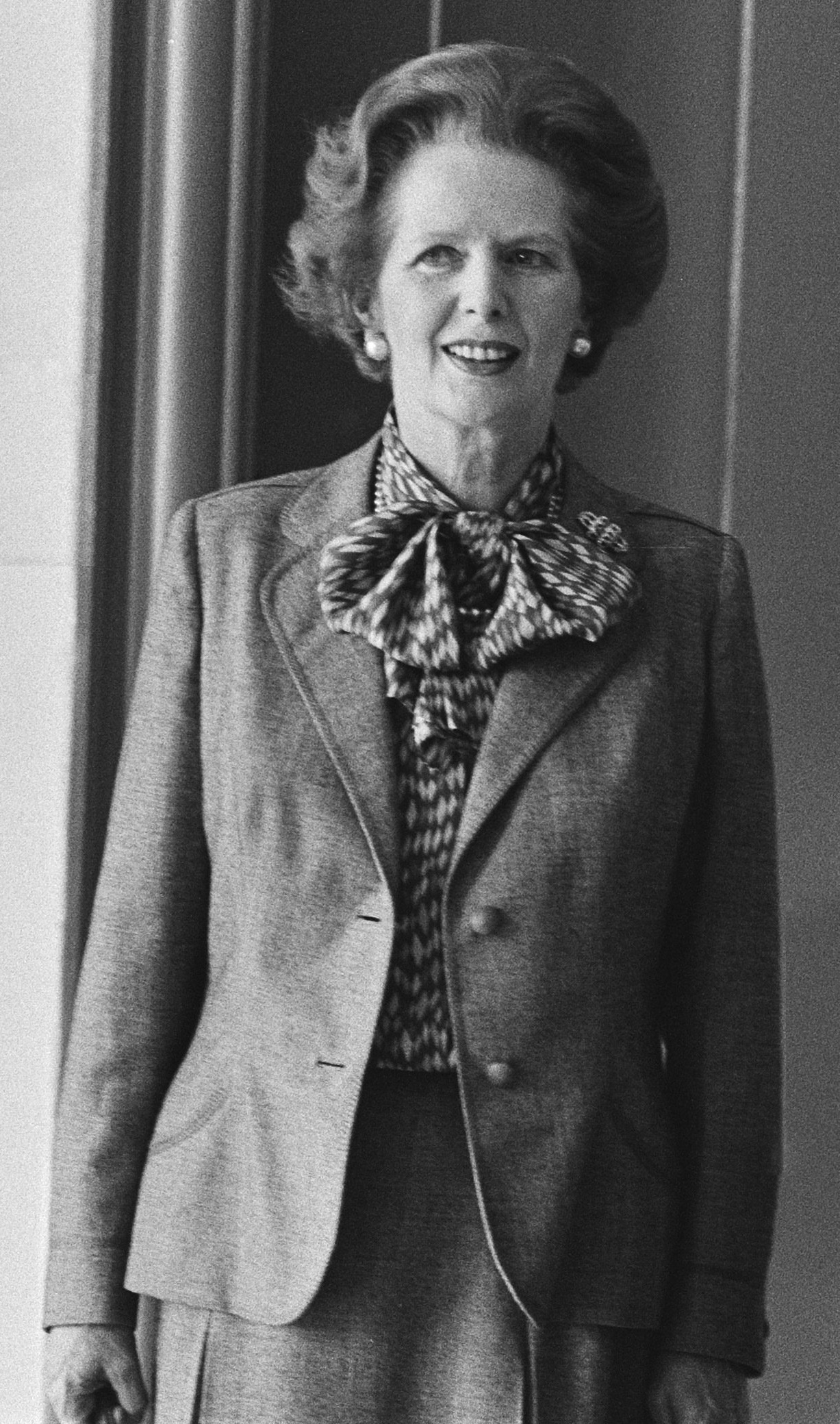
Prime Minister Margaret Thatcher, who was dubbed by communist opponents as the Iron Lady, is known for embracing the nickname, which would later become a general sobriquet for other strong-willed female politicians.

The likeability trap is a campaign tactic where one attempts to portray one's opponent, usually a woman, as calculating or power-hungry to harm their general likeability among the electorate. The emergence of many women as democratic heads of government in the late 20th and early 21st centuries enabled research into the mechanisms through which popular biases against women affect general voter approval of female elected officials.

Although the tactic is most well-studied in the context of politics, some writers such as Alicia Menendez have also observed similar phenomena in business management.

== Political campaigns ==
The likeability trap was long regarded as an effective campaign tactic because of an assumed mismatch between societal norms regarding gender roles and leadership roles. Any attempt by the target candidate to shift their public image towards a more leader-like persona implies shifting it away from the locally-ideal gender role and thus inviting backlash.

=== Mechanisms ===
The mechanisms of democratic bias against women are the subject of active research. A 2010 study examining pre- and post-election approval ratings of candidates in US state elections found that likeability was the single most important factor determining the success or failure of women candidates. In contrast, male candidates exhibited no such dependence, indicating that US voters were more willing to vote for a male candidate who they viewed as being qualified, but that they did not personally like.

=== Countertactics ===
Some strategists have found gender display to be an effective countertactic for mitigating perceived misalignment between a candidate's gender role and leadership role.

== United States ==
Because the United States has never had a woman as president, the ability to conduct natural experiments at the national level studying electoral bias against women was extremely limited until the early 21st century. Interest in the phenomenon increased following Senator Hillary Clinton's ultimately-unsuccessful primary bid against then-Senator Barack Obama. A 2012 study by the Barbara Lee Family Foundation found that approximately 34 percent of US voters consider male candidates more qualified than female candidates. Bias against women in politics is more prevalent among younger voters than older voters. The effect was most pronounced among younger African-American voters, with 50 percent indicating that they would consider a male candidate more qualified than a female candidate.

Then-presidential candidate Barack Obama himself was noted for employing the tactic against Clinton during the 2008 Democratic primaries when he responded to Clinton "You're likable enough, Hillary." Obama's comments at the time were widely criticized, and Clinton defeated him in the New Hampshire primary a few days later. Although later observers assume Obama to have employed the tactic effectively, pundits at the time generally viewed the episode as unfavorable to Obama. Some writers such as Ann Friedman and Rebecca Traister attribute the lack of women in senior government roles to differing societal views towards traits like ambition and assertiveness in men as opposed to women.

== Entertainment business ==
In the context of the entertainment industry, female musicians such as Taylor Swift have been cited as subjects of the likeability trap. Swift's detractors have accused her of being "calculated" and manipulating her image—a narrative bolstered after the 2016 dispute with American rapper Kanye West. Cultural critics have highlighted that Swift's life and career have been subject to intense misogyny and slut-shaming, and she is an easy target of "fragile male egos". In a 2019 Vogue interview, Swift stated that Clinton was being called a "manipulative" liar by Trumpists on the internet—the same type of negative comments Swift had received in 2016, and wondered whether she would be a liability to Clinton if she had openly endorsed Clinton for the 2016 US presidential election: "Look, snakes of a feather flock together. Look, the two lying women. The two nasty women"; Swift added that as "millions of people were telling [her] to disappear", she decided to step away from spotlight for a year. "Snake" was a word used by detractors to ridicule Swift, who embraced the term and made it the main visual motif of her 2017 album, Reputation.

== See also ==
- Public image of Hillary Clinton
- Elizabeth Warren
- Margaret Thatcher
- Giorgia Meloni
- Pink Chanel suit of Jacqueline Bouvier Kennedy
- Cultural impact of Taylor Swift
