= Alicia Menendez =

American television commentator

- Menendez in 2026
- Born: Alicia Jacobsen Menendez; July 2, 1983 (age 43)
- Education: Harvard University (BA)
- Occupations: TV commentator; news anchor; writer
- Political party: Democratic
- Spouse: Carlos Prío Odio (m. 2015)
- Children: 2
- Father: Bob Menendez
- Relatives: Rob Menendez (brother)

Alicia Jacobsen Menendez (/əˈliːsiə/ ə-LEE-see-ə; born July 2, 1983) is an American television commentator, host, and writer. She is the author of the book The Likeability Trap: How to Break Free and Succeed as You Are (2019), and is an anchor for MS NOW. From 2020 to 2024, she was host of American Voices with Alicia Menendez on Saturdays and Sundays on MSNBC. She is also a contributing editor at Bustle and host of its Latina to Latina podcast. Formerly, she was a correspondent on the PBS show Amanpour & Company and the host of Come Here and Say That on Fusion. Prior to that she was a host and producer at HuffPost Live. She is the daughter of former United States Senator Bob Menendez. She currently hosts MS NOW's On the Line with Alicia Menendez at 12 pm ET weekdays.

== Early life ==
Menendez grew up in Union City, New Jersey, the daughter of former United States Senator Bob Menendez and Jane Jacobsen, a teacher. Her brother is United States House of Representatives Congressman Rob Menendez Jr.. Her father is a first-generation American of Cuban ancestry and her mother is of German, Norwegian, and Irish ancestry. She graduated from Harvard College in 2005. She was raised Catholic. At Harvard University, Menendez's senior honors thesis on women's social capital drew the attention of U.S. News & World Report and The New York Times. In 2005, The Harvard Crimson named Menendez one of the 15 most interesting members of the class of 2005 and she was selected to deliver her undergraduate commencement address.

== Career ==
Menendez was a frequent guest on CNN, Fox News Channel, and MSNBC. Prior to joining HuffPost Live, the streaming video network of The Huffington Post, Menendez co-hosted Power Play on Sirius XM's Cristina Radio, and served as a contributor to NBCLatino.com. In 2011, Menendez and Adriana Maestas founded Dailygrito.com, a website that offers a Latino take on politics and media. In 2012, DailyGrito.com was acquired by Politic365.com.

Menendez co-founded Define American with Jose Antonio Vargas, Jake Brewer, and Jehmu Greene. Define American focuses on immigration reform. She served as Senior Advisor at NDN, a center-left think tank and advocacy organization in Washington, DC. Menendez is a veteran of Rock the Vote and Democracia USA. She also spent time as a television segment producer and on-air contributor for RNN TV in New York. Menendez is a former correspondent for the show Amanpour & Company on PBS. She joined MSNBC in October 2019. On September 19, 2020, she began hosting a new program on MSNBC, American Voices, which aired on Saturdays and Sundays. In 2022, she was regularly seen on MSNBC serving as guest anchor of other programs such as All In, Alex Wagner Tonight and the 11th Hour.

Following November 2022's midterm elections, in which Republicans performed poorly among single women voters, Fox News host Jesse Watters said that "Democrat (sic) policies are designed to keep women single" and that single women need to get married as more married women vote Republican. On MSNBC, Menendez said that such comments exhibited "big incel vibes."

In September 2023, Menendez's father, U.S. Senator Bob Menendez, was indicted for the second time on new federal corruption charges including bribery, extortion and using his position to benefit the Egyptian government. On the September 30 broadcast of her MSNBC show American Voices, Alicia Menendez opened by recusing herself from covering her father's criminal indictment. Menendez said that while she could not comment on the case, her colleagues at MSNBC and NBC News "have aggressively covered this story and will continue to do so, as they should".

On November 30, 2023, MSNBC announced that Menendez would move to weekend mornings to anchor a new program, The Weekend, with Symone Sanders-Townsend and Michael Steele. Her show American Voices ended on January 13, 2024 with The Weekend premiering on the same day.

Menendez was a guest host of the MSNBC show Deadline: White House while Nicolle Wallace took maternal leave in early 2024.

Starting February 24, 2025, Menendez and her other co-hosts on The Weekend would co-host a newscast on MSNBC's weekday 7 p.m. ET time slot, which was previously occupied by Joy Reid's The ReidOut.

In March 2026, MS NOW announced that Menendez would vacate her spot on The Weeknight and host an afternoon news program, beginning in June 2026. The program, titled On the Line with Alicia Menendez, debuted on June 15.

== Personal life ==
Menendez is the daughter of former United States Senator Bob Menendez.

In 2015, Menendez married Carlos Prío Odio in Coral Gables, Florida. Prío's grandfather, Carlos Prío Socarrás, was the president of Cuba from 1948 to 1952. She lived in Miami before moving to New Jersey with her husband and two children.

== Bibliography ==
- Menendez, Alicia (2019). The Likeability Trap: How to Break Free and Succeed as You Are. New York: HarperCollins. ISBN 978-0-06-283876-6.
- Menendez, Alicia (November 5, 2019). "Why We Should Let Go of Old Rules and Reimagine Leadership". Thrive Global.

== See also ==
- Likeability trap
