= Amanpour & Company =

American global affairs television program

- Also known as: Amanpour & Co. Amanpour on PBS
- Created by: CNN International and WNET
- Presented by: Christiane Amanpour
- Country of origin: United States

Production
- Executive producers: Scott Davis and Annabel Archer
- Production locations: London (most episodes for Amanpour); New York City (some episodes for Amanpour and most for other anchors); Los Angeles (some episodes for Sara Sidner); Atlanta (some episodes for Michael Holmes); Washington, D.C. (one episode for Audie Cornish)
- Camera setup: Multi-camera
- Running time: 60 minutes

Original release
- Network: PBS
- Release: December 4, 2017 – present

Related
- Amanpour

Amanpour & Company (stylized as Amanpour & Co.) is a late-night global-affairs interview television program hosted by Christiane Amanpour. The hour-long show premiered on PBS in September 2018 as an expanded version of the CNN International show Amanpour, augmented with interviews by correspondents at the WNET studios in New York.

== History ==
Following the removal of Charlie Rose in December 2017 after the eponymous host's sexual harassment scandal, CNN offered Amanpour to PBS to air in its place. The CNN International show aired in its exact same 30-minute format minus the CNN branding and commercials from December 2017 until September 2018 as Amanpour on PBS. From shortly after PBS picked up the show, plans were in the works for an expanded PBS version of the program. The result was Amanpour & Company which was announced in May 2018 with an expanded one-hour running time and a third interview block conducted by correspondents from WNET in New York. Correspondent Alicia Menendez left the show on October 1, 2019, and joined MSNBC.

Every broadcast began with Amanpour saying "Hello everyone, and welcome to Amanpour & Company. Here's what's coming up." and "Welcome to the program, everyone. I am Christiane Amanpour in London". Each broadcast features three interviews, two from Amanpour and one from one of the correspondents during the second half of the broadcast.

On October 19, 2026, Amanpour announced that she's ending the program in December 2026, citing her departure of CNN.

== Correspondents ==
=== Current ===
- Walter Isaacson
- Michel Martin
- Hari Sreenivasan
- Ana Cabrera (minor)

=== Former ===
- Alicia Menendez (September 10, 2018 – October 1, 2019)

== Guest anchors ==
- Audie Cornish
- Paula Newton
- Sara Sidner

=== Former ===
- Bianna Golodryga (until 2026)
- Michael Holmes (2024)
