= Public image of Hillary Clinton =

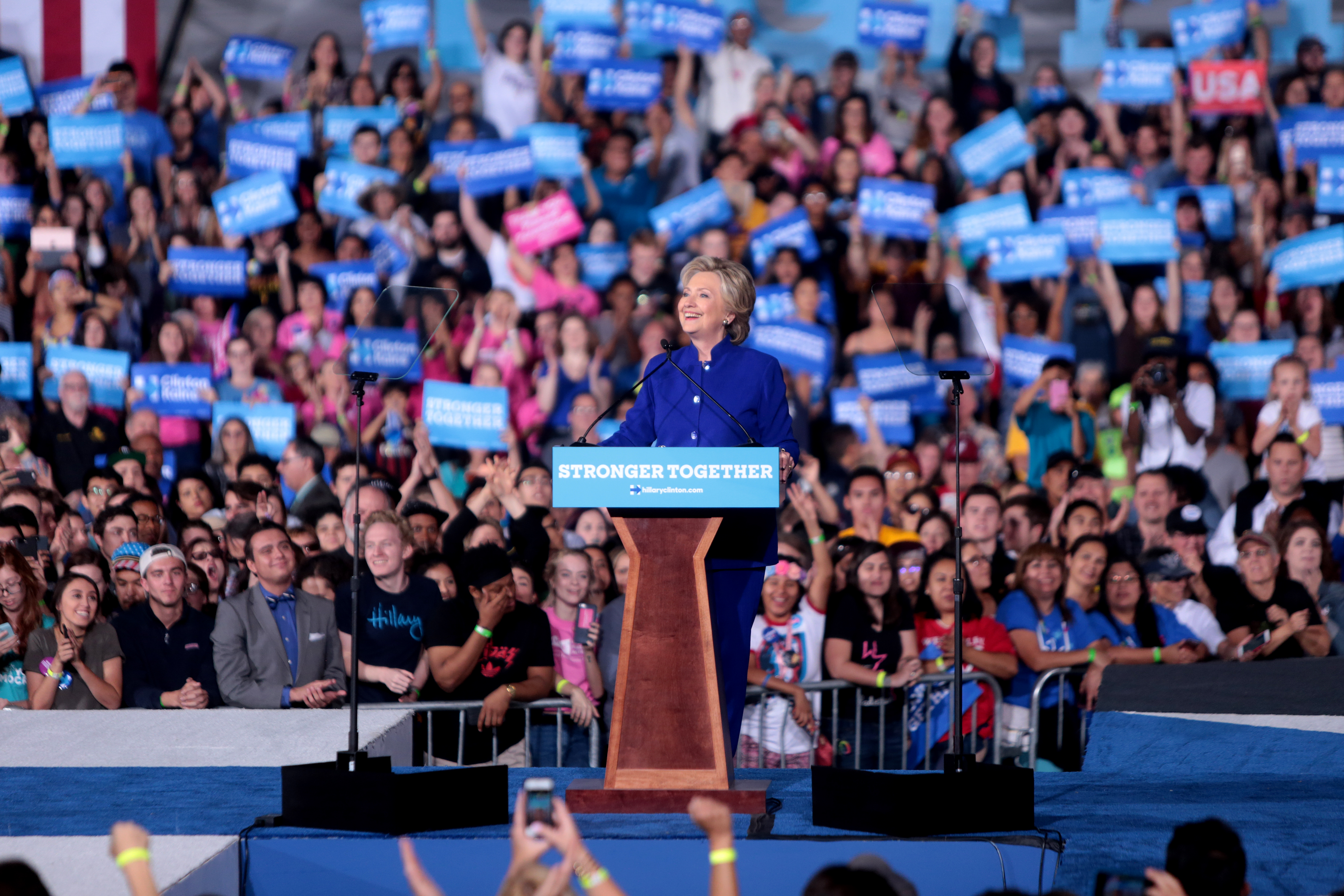
Hillary Clinton with supporters in 2016

The cultural and political image of Hillary Clinton has been explored since the early 1990s, when her husband Bill Clinton launched his presidential campaign, and has continued to draw broad public attention during her time as First Lady of the United States, U.S. Senator from New York, 67th United States Secretary of State, and the Democratic Party's nominee for President of the United States in the 2016 election.

== Subject of writings ==
Over a hundred books and scholarly works have been written about Clinton, from many perspectives. A 2006 survey by The New York Observer found "a virtual cottage industry" of "anti-Clinton literature", put out by Regnery Publishing and other conservative imprints, with titles such as Madame Hillary: The Dark Road to the White House, Hillary's Scheme: Inside the Next Clinton's Ruthless Agenda to Take the White House and Can She Be Stopped?: Hillary Clinton Will Be the Next President of the United States Unless ... Books praising Clinton did not sell nearly as well (other than the memoirs written by her and her husband). When she ran for Senate in 2000, a number of fundraising groups such as Save Our Senate and the Emergency Committee to Stop Hillary Rodham Clinton sprang up to oppose her. Van Natta found that Republican and conservative groups viewed her as a reliable "bogeyman" to mention in fundraising letters, on a par with Ted Kennedy and the equivalent of Democratic and liberal appeals mentioning Newt Gingrich.

Clinton has also been featured in the media and popular culture from a wide spectrum of varying perspectives. In 1995, writer Todd S. Purdum of The New York Times characterized Clinton as a Rorschach test, an assessment echoed at the time by feminist writer and activist Betty Friedan, who said, "Coverage of Hillary Clinton is a massive Rorschach test of the evolution of women in our society." She has been the subject of many satirical impressions on Saturday Night Live, beginning with her time as first lady and has made guest appearances on the show herself, in 2008 and in 2015, to face-off with her doppelgängers. Jonathan Mann wrote songs about her, including but not limited to "The Hillary Shimmy Song", which went viral.

== Assertions of polarization ==
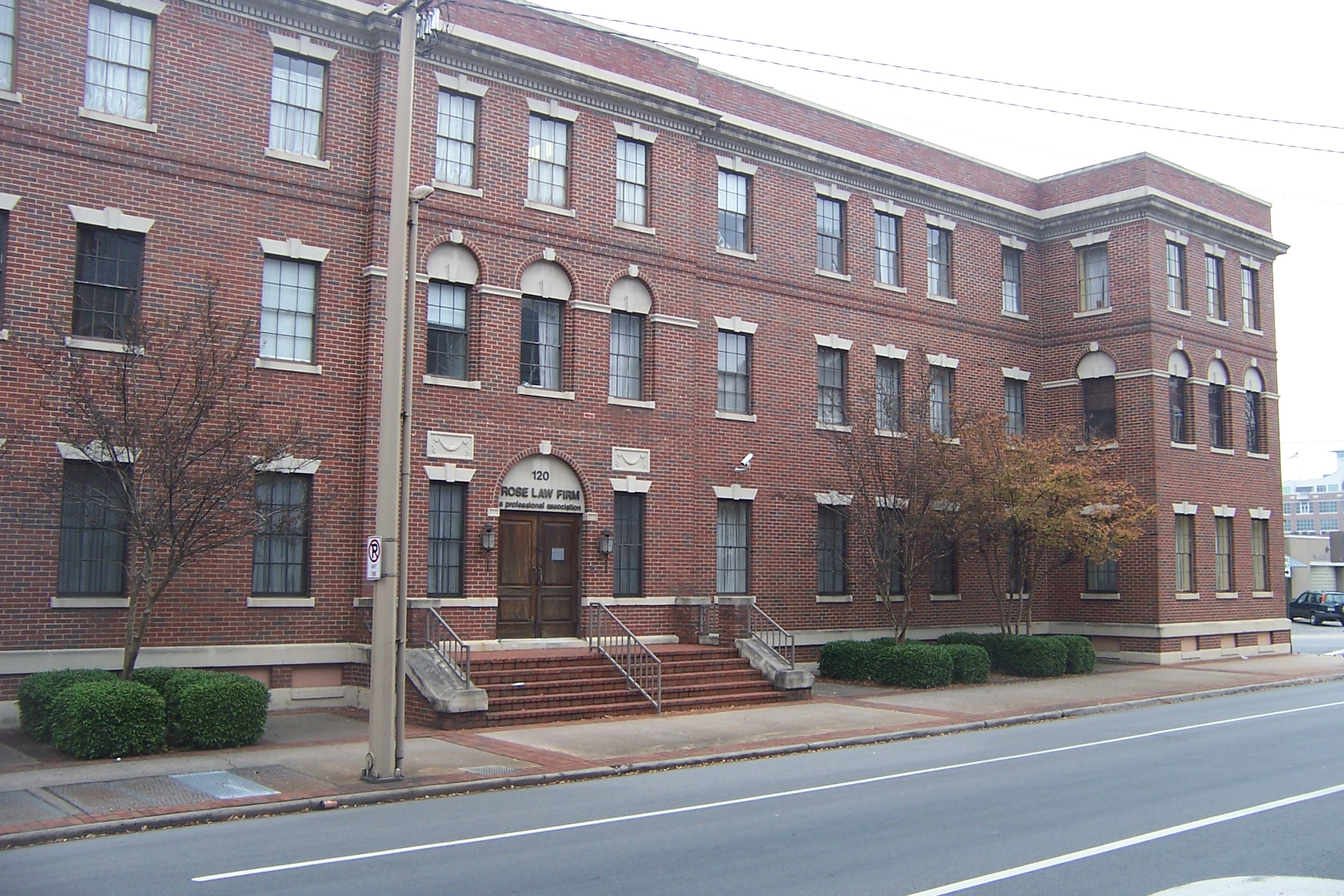
Clinton worked at Rose Law Firm for fifteen years. Her professional career and political involvement set the stage for public reaction to her as first lady.

Clinton has often been described in the popular media as a polarizing figure, with some arguing otherwise. James Madison University political science professor Valerie Sulfaro's 2007 study used the American National Election Studies' "feeling thermometer" polls, which measure the degree of opinion about a political figure, to find that such polls during Clinton's first lady years confirm the "conventional wisdom that Hillary Clinton is a polarizing figure", with the added insight that "affect towards Mrs. Clinton as first lady tended to be very positive or very negative, with a fairly constant one fourth of respondents feeling ambivalent or neutral". University of California, San Diego political science professor Gary Jacobson's 2006 study of partisan polarization found that in a state-by-state survey of job approval ratings of the state's senators, Clinton had the fourth-largest partisan difference of any senator, with a 50-percentage-point difference in approval between New York's Democrats and Republicans.

Northern Illinois University political science professor Barbara Burrell's 2000 study found that Clinton's Gallup poll favorability numbers broke sharply along partisan lines throughout her time as first lady, with 70 to 90 percent of Democrats typically viewing her favorably while only 20 to 40 percent of Republicans did. University of Wisconsin–Madison political science professor Charles Franklin analyzed her record of favorable versus unfavorable ratings in public opinion polls and found that there was more variation in them during her first lady years than her Senate years. The Senate years showed favorable ratings around 50 percent and unfavorable ratings in the mid-40 percent range; Franklin noted that, "This sharp split is, of course, one of the more widely remarked aspects of Sen. Clinton's public image." McGill University professor of history Gil Troy titled his 2006 biography of her Hillary Rodham Clinton: Polarizing First Lady and wrote that after the 1992 campaign, Clinton "was a polarizing figure, with 42 percent [of the public] saying she came closer to their values and lifestyle than previous first ladies and 41 percent disagreeing." Troy further wrote that Clinton "has been uniquely controversial and contradictory since she first appeared on the national radar screen in 1992" and that she "has alternately fascinated, bedeviled, bewitched and appalled Americans."

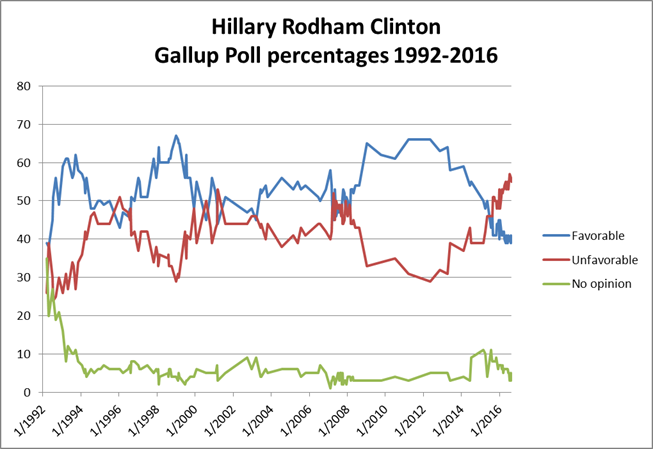
Clinton's Gallup Poll favorable and unfavorable ratings, 1992–2016. The ratings show her as a controversial first lady whose ratings hit a low following the Hillarycare failure and a high following the Lewinsky scandal. Opinion about her was closely divided during her 2000 Senate campaign, mildly positive during her time as a senator and then closely divided again during her 2008 presidential campaign. As secretary of state, she enjoyed widespread approval, before dipping as her tenure ended and then to some of her lowest ratings ever as she became viewed as a presidential candidate again.

Burrell's study found women consistently rating Clinton more favorably than men by about ten percentage points during her first lady years. Jacobson's study found a positive correlation across all senators between being women and receiving a partisan-polarized response. Colorado State University communication studies professor Karrin Vasby Anderson describes the first lady position as a "site" for American womanhood, one ready made for the symbolic negotiation of female identity. In particular, Anderson states there has been a cultural bias towards traditional first ladies and a cultural prohibition against modern first ladies; by the time of Clinton, the first lady position had become a site of heterogeneity and paradox. Burrell, as well as biographers Jeff Gerth and Don Van Natta Jr., note that Clinton achieved her highest approval ratings as first lady late in 1998, not for professional or political achievements of her own, but for being seen as the victim of her husband's very public infidelity. University of Pennsylvania communications professor Kathleen Hall Jamieson saw Clinton as an exemplar of the double bind, who though able to live in a "both-and" world of both career and family, nevertheless "became a surrogate on whom we projected our attitudes about attributes once thought incompatible", leading to her being placed in a variety of no-win situations. Quinnipiac University media studies professor Lisa Burns found press accounts frequently framing Clinton both as an exemplar of the modern professional working mother and as a political interloper interested in usurping power for herself. University of Indianapolis English professor Charlotte Templin found political cartoonists using a variety of stereotypes—such as gender reversal, radical feminist as emasculator and the wife the husband wants to get rid of—to portray Clinton as violating gender norms.

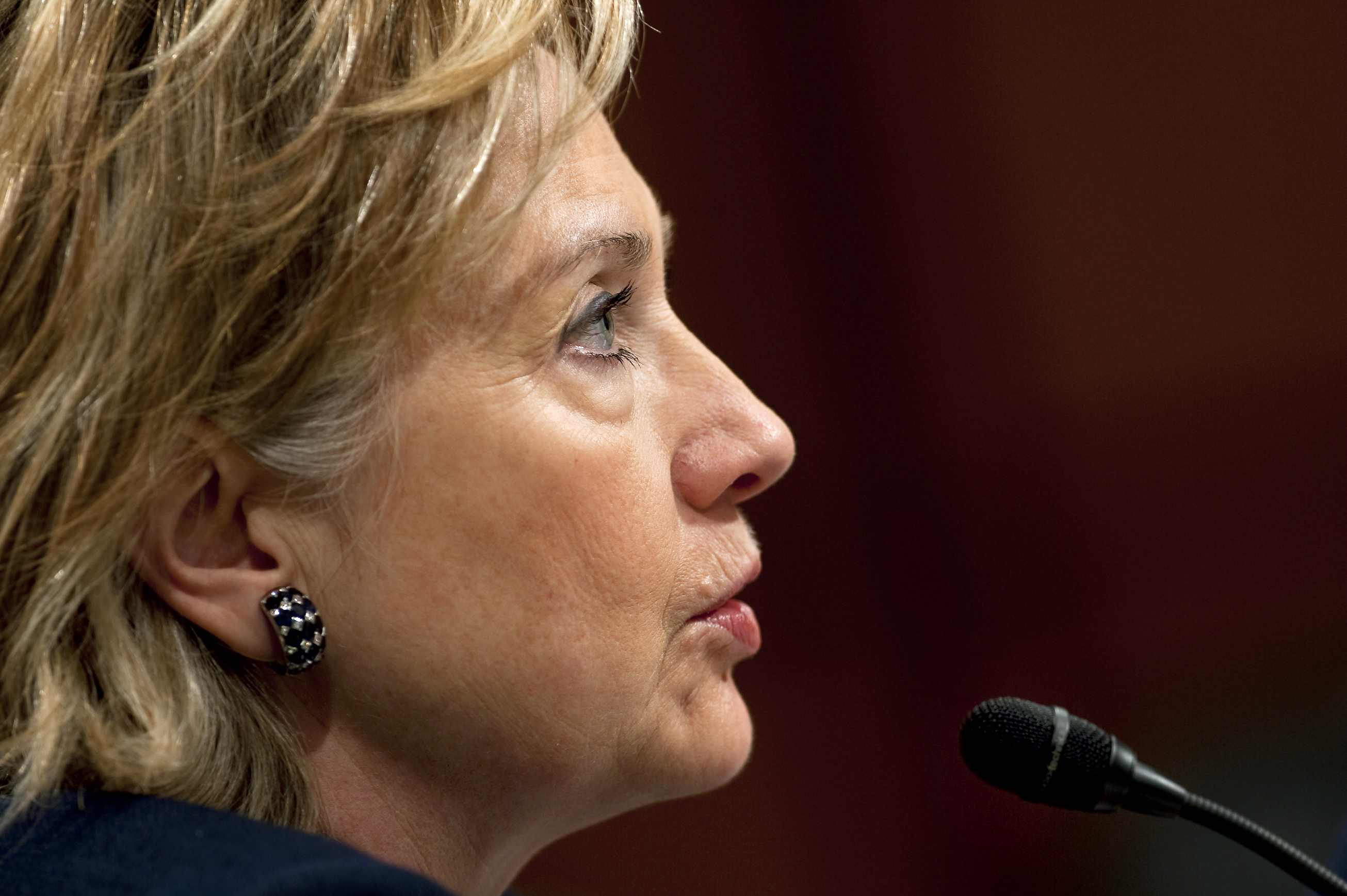
Clinton in 2009

Going into the early stages of her presidential campaign for 2008, a Time magazine cover showed a large picture of her, with two checkboxes labeled "Love Her", "Hate Her", while Mother Jones titled its profile of her "Harpy, Hero, Heretic: Hillary". Democratic netroots activists consistently rated Clinton very low in polls of their desired candidates, while some conservative figures such as Bruce Bartlett and Christopher Ruddy were declaring a Hillary Clinton presidency not so bad after all. An October 2007 cover of The American Conservative magazine was titled "The Waning Power of Hillary Hate". By December 2007, communications professor Jamieson observed that there was a large amount of misogyny present about Clinton on the Internet, up to and including instances on Facebook and other sites devoted to depictions reducing Clinton to sexual humiliation. She noted, in response to widespread comments on Clinton's laugh, that "We know that there's language to condemn female speech that doesn't exist for male speech. We call women's speech shrill and strident. And Hillary Clinton's laugh was being described as a cackle." The "bitch" epithet, which had been applied to Clinton going back to her first lady days and had been seen by Karrin Vasby Anderson as a tool of containment against women in American politics, flourished during the campaign, especially on the Internet but via conventional media as well. Following Clinton's "choked up moment" and related incidents in the run-up to the January 2008 New Hampshire primary, both The New York Times and Newsweek found that discussion of gender's role in the campaign had moved into the national political discourse. Newsweek editor Jon Meacham summed the relationship between Clinton and the American public by saying that the New Hampshire events "brought an odd truth to light: though Hillary Rodham Clinton has been on the periphery or in the middle of national life for decades ... she is one of the most recognizable but least understood figures in American politics."

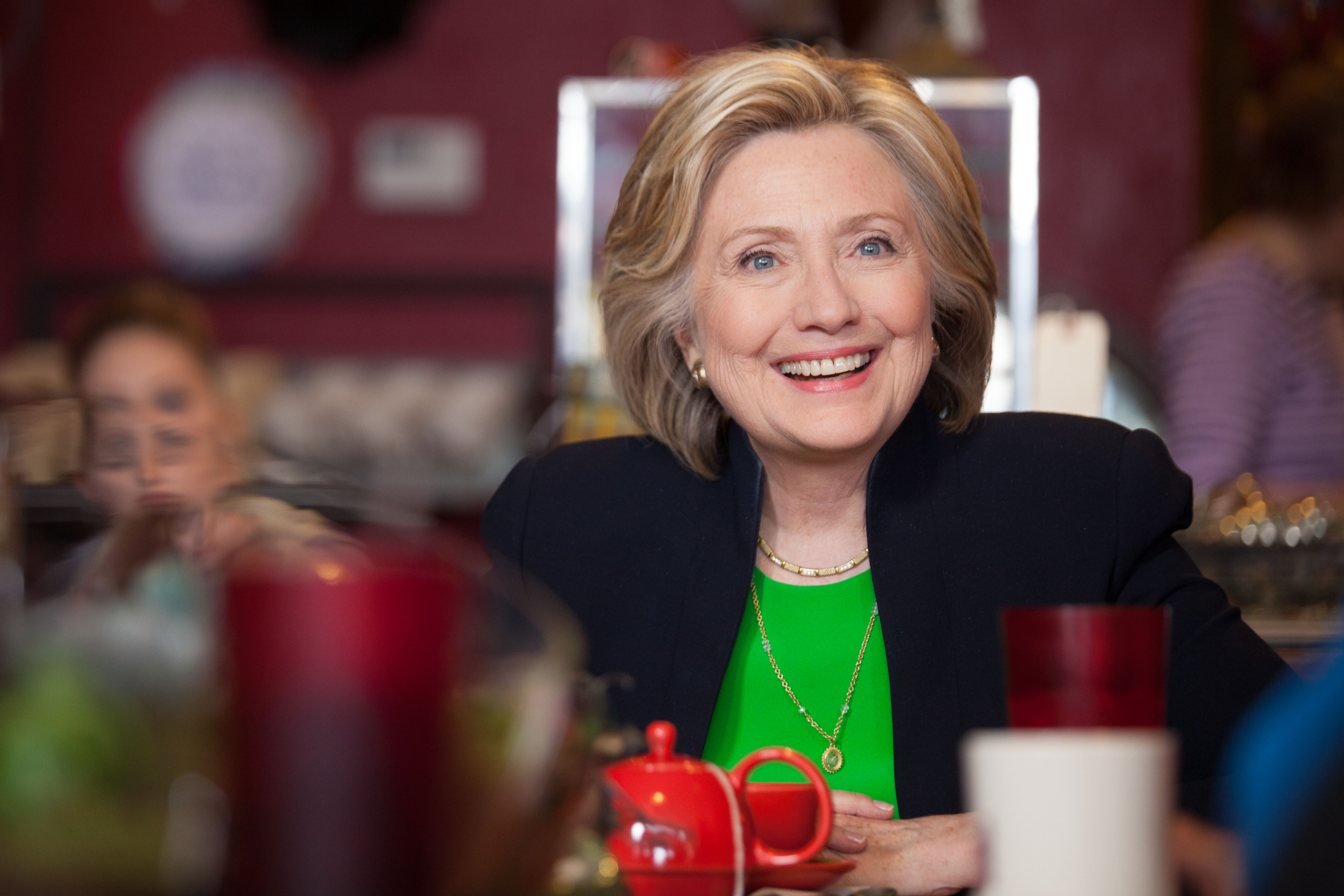
Clinton in April 2015

Once she became Secretary of State, Clinton's image seemed to improve dramatically among the American public and become one of a respected world figure. She gained consistently high approval ratings (by 2011, the highest of her career except during the Lewinsky scandal), and her favorable-unfavorable ratings during 2010 and 2011 were the highest of any active, nationally prominent American political figure. A 2012 Internet meme, "Texts from Hillary", was based around a photograph of Clinton sitting on a military plane wearing sunglasses and using a mobile phone and imagined the recipients and contents of her text messages. It achieved viral popularity among younger, technically adept followers of politics. Clinton sought to explain her popularity by saying in early 2012, "There's a certain consistency to who I am and what I do and I think people have finally said, 'Well, you know, I kinda get her now.'" She continued to do well in Gallup's most admired man and woman poll and in 2015 she was named the most admired woman by Americans for a record fourteenth straight time and twentieth time overall.

Her favorability ratings dropped, however, after she left office and began to be viewed in the context of partisan politics once more. By September 2015, with her 2016 presidential campaign underway and beset by continued reports regarding her private email usage at the State Department, her ratings had slumped to some of her lowest levels ever. During 2016 she acknowledged that: "I'm not a natural politician, in case you haven't noticed." In July 2017 Bloomberg showed her approval rating at 39 percent.

== Public name usage ==
Several names have been used at various points during Clinton's life, including names preferred by Clinton, names used for her by political opponents, and names used for her by others. Following her birth at Edgewater Hospital in Chicago, Illinois, Clinton was initially named "Hillary Diane Rodham", and was generally referred to as "Hillary Rodham". In some formal settings, she used "Hillary D. Rodham", which appeared on her senior thesis, in the transcript of her Wellesley graduation speech, in reports of the United States House of Representatives investigation into the Watergate scandal, and as chair of the Legal Services Corporation. In 1995, Hillary Clinton said her mother had named her after Sir Edmund Hillary, co-first mountaineer to scale Mount Everest, and that was the reason for the less-common "two L's" spelling of her name. However, the first successful Everest climb did not take place until 1953, more than five years after she was born. In October 2006, a Clinton spokeswoman said she was not named after the mountain climber. Instead, this account of her name's origin "was a sweet family story her mother shared to inspire greatness in her daughter, to great results I might add."

Following her marriage to Bill Clinton in 1975, she continued to be known almost exclusively as "Hillary Rodham". Bill Clinton's advisers thought her use of her maiden name to be one of the reasons for his 1980 gubernatorial re-election loss. During the following winter, Vernon Jordan suggested to Hillary Rodham that she start using the name Clinton, and she began to do so publicly with her husband's February 1982 campaign announcement to regain that office. She later wrote that "I learned the hard way that some voters in Arkansas were seriously offended by the fact that I kept my maiden name". Once he was elected again, she made a point of using "Hillary Rodham Clinton" in work she did as First Lady of the state.

=== As First Lady of the United States ===
Once she became First Lady of the United States in 1993, she publicly stated that she wanted to be known as "Hillary Rodham Clinton". (This announcement was parodied by the May 1993 film spoof Hot Shots! Part Deux, in which all the female characters were given the middle name "Rodham"; see IMDB entry). As of 1993, she had not legally changed her name from Hillary Rodham. She authored five books and numerous articles as "Hillary Rodham Clinton", interspersed with a smaller number of articles authored as "Hillary Clinton".

During this time, the blended name "Billary" came to be used to refer to Bill and Hillary Clinton as a pair. Sidney Johnson, president of the Arkansas Education Association, said of the couple that "[s]omething would come down and you wouldn't know which one of them thought of it, where Bill stopped and Hillary began. That's why we called them 'Billary.'" One observer notes that "[t]he Clintons originally warmed to Billary because it suggested the public would get two smart politicians for one, but it soon became a term of derision for those who saw Hillary Rodham Clinton as too powerful." Among the early users of "Billary" in a derogatory sense was Rush Limbaugh, in his 1993 book, See, I Told You So. In some media, her name has been abbreviated as "Hill", particularly when used in combination with that of her husband, as "Bill and Hill". Clinton was assigned the Secret Service codename "Evergreen".

=== Later political career ===
Clinton continued to use "Hillary Rodham Clinton" on her website and elsewhere once she was a U.S. Senator. When she ran for president during 2007–08, she used the name "Hillary Clinton" or just "Hillary" in campaign materials, and appeared on state ballots as "Hillary Clinton". She used "Hillary Rodham Clinton" again in official materials while serving as United States Secretary of State. In some instances, particularly in email correspondence, Clinton was referred to or signed communications by her initials, HRC. As Secretary of State, Clinton used "hdr22@clintonemail.com" as her private email address, incorporating her premarital initials.

As of the 2015 launch of her second presidential campaign, she again switched to using "Hillary Clinton" in campaign materials. Clinton's Twitter account notes that tweets "from Hillary" (as opposed to staffers) are signed -H. As of November 30, 2015, both the Associated Press and The New York Times noted that they would no longer use "Rodham" in referring to Clinton, with the AP stating that "the campaign says to go with Hillary Clinton", and The New York Times providing the statement that:

[T]he Clinton campaign confirmed on Monday that Mrs. Clinton prefers to be simply, "Hillary Clinton," aligning herself with the branding of her 2016 presidential campaign and the name she has signed to be placed on the ballots of Iowa, New Hampshire, South Carolina and other states.

The changing usage of Clinton's name has been noted by various observers, and has been related to her political and social role at the time:

[I]t seems that when Clinton feels that a more traditional naming pattern might be a matter of protocol or politically advantageous -- capable of helping her play down the traits for which she is most often criticized -- she is Hillary Clinton. But when Clinton is operating in the private sector or safely ensconced in a public service position where there was no risk of voter backlash, she's Hillary Rodham Clinton.

Political detractors have often referred to Clinton by any of a number of insulting portmanteau names, such as "Shillary", a combination of "shill" and "Hillary" and "Killary", a combination of "kill" and "Hillary" in reference to the Clinton body count conspiracy theory asserting that she and former U.S. President Bill Clinton had Americans assassinated.
