= Bush White House email controversy =

During the 2007 Congressional investigation of the dismissal of eight U.S. attorneys, it was discovered that administration officials had been using a private Internet domain, called gwb43.com, owned by and hosted on an email server run by the Republican National Committee, for various official communications. The domain name is an abbreviation for "George W. Bush, 43rd" President of the United States. The use of this email domain became public when it was discovered that Scott Jennings, the White House's deputy director of political affairs, was using a gwb43.com email address to discuss the firing of the U.S. attorney for Arkansas. Communications by federal employees were also found on georgewbush.com (registered to "Bush-Cheney '04, Inc.") and rnchq.org (registered to "Republican National Committee"). Congressional requests for administration documents while investigating the dismissals of the U.S. attorneys required the Bush administration to reveal that not all internal White House emails were available. Conducting governmental business in this manner is a possible violation of the Presidential Records Act of 1978. Over 5 million emails may have been lost. Greg Palast claims to have come up with 500 of the Karl Rove emails, leading to damaging allegations. In 2009, it was announced that as many as 22 million emails may have been lost.

The "gwb43.com" domain name was publicized by Citizens for Responsibility and Ethics in Washington (CREW), who sent a letter to Oversight and Government Reform Committee chairman Henry A. Waxman requesting an investigation. Waxman sent a formal warning to the RNC, advising them to retain copies of all emails sent by White House employees. According to Waxman, "in some instances, White House officials were using nongovernmental accounts specifically to avoid creating a record of the communications." The Republican National Committee claims to have erased the emails, supposedly making them unavailable for Congressional investigators.

On April 12, 2007, White House spokesman Scott Stanzel stated that White House staffers were told to use RNC accounts to "err on the side of avoiding violations of the Hatch Act, but they should also retain that information so it can be reviewed for the Presidential Records Act," and that "some employees ... have communicated about official business on those political email accounts." Stanzel also said that even though RNC policy since 2004 has been to retain all emails of White House staff with RNC accounts, the staffers had the ability to delete the email, themselves.

On December 14, 2009, CNN reported that 22 million missing emails had been found on backup tapes, and that the Obama Administration reached a settlement with two watchdog groups who had sued to obtain the emails.

== Use by senior White House staff ==
According to a former White House official, Karl Rove used RNC-hosted addresses for roughly "95 percent" of his email. Rove provided email from his kr@georgewbush.com address in exhibits to the United States House Committee on the Judiciary.

White House deputy Jennifer Farley told Jack Abramoff not to use the official White House system "because it might actually limit what they can do to help us, especially since there could be lawsuits, etc." Abramoff responded, "Dammit. It was sent to Susan on her RNC pager and was not supposed to go into the WH system."

== Investigations with missing emails ==
=== House Committee on Oversight and Government Reform ===
The House Oversight committee in an interim staff report, released on June 18, 2007:

- At least eighty-eight Republican National Committee email accounts were granted to senior Bush administration officials, not "just a handful" as previously reported by the White House spokesperson Dana Perino in March 2007. Her estimate was later revised to "about fifty." Officials with accounts included: Karl Rove, the President's senior advisor; Andrew Card, the former White House Chief of Staff; Ken Mehlman, the former White House Director of Political Affairs; and many other officials in the Office of Political Affairs, the Office of Communications, and the Office of the Vice President.
- The RNC has 140,216 emails sent or received by Karl Rove. Over half of these emails (75,374) were sent to or received from individuals using official ".gov" email accounts. Other users of RNC email accounts include former Director of Political Affairs Sara Taylor (66,018 emails) and Deputy Director of Political Affairs Scott Jennings (35,198 emails). These email accounts were used by White House officials for official purposes, such as communicating with federal agencies about federal appointments and policies.
- Of the 88 White House officials who received RNC email accounts, the RNC has preserved no emails for 51 officials.
- There is evidence that the Office of White House Counsel under Alberto Gonzales may have known that White House officials were using RNC email accounts for official business, but took no action to preserve these presidential records.
- The evidence obtained by the Committee indicates that White House officials used their RNC email accounts in a manner that circumvented these requirements. At this point in the investigation, it is not possible to determine precisely how many presidential records may have been destroyed by the RNC. Given the heavy reliance by White House officials on RNC email accounts, the high rank of the White House officials involved, and the large quantity of missing emails, the potential violation of the Presidential Records Act may be extensive.

=== Dismissal of U.S. attorneys controversy ===
During the investigation into the firing of eight U.S. attorneys, it became known White House staff was using Republican National Committee (RNC) email accounts. The White House stated it might have lost five million emails.

On May 2, 2007, the Senate Judiciary Committee issued a subpoena to Attorney General Alberto Gonzales and the Department of Justice (DOJ) compelling the production of email Karl Rove sent to DOJ staff, regarding evaluation and dismissal of attorneys, no matter what email account Rove used, whether White House or National Republican party accounts, or other accounts, with a deadline of May 15, 2007 for compliance. The subpoena also demanded relevant email previously produced in the Valerie Plame controversy and investigation for the CIA leak scandal (2003).

=== CIA leak grand jury investigation ===
Ambassador Joseph C. Wilson alleged that his wife's identity was covert and that members of the George W. Bush administration knowingly revealed that information as retribution for his New York Times op-ed entitled "What I Didn't Find in Africa," of July 6, 2003, regarding the claim that Saddam Hussein was seeking uranium. Patrick J. Fitzgerald, while investigating the leak, found that emails were missing from the White House server. Mother Jones wrote that this is possibly the reason the RNC changed the policy of deleting emails after 30 days to saving all email sent and received by White House officials. In light of the apparent vanished emails Citizens for Responsibility and Ethics in Washington (CREW) has asked to reopen the investigation.

=== General Services Administration ===
It is feared that the missing emails might also affect congressional investigation of General Services Administration.

=== Department of Education ===
While investigating the Reading First program CREW learned that employees use private emails to conduct official business. This might be a violation of the Federal Records Act.

== Legalities ==
=== The Hatch Act ===
The Hatch Act prohibits the use of government resources, including email accounts, for political purposes. The Bush administration stated the RNC accounts were used to prevent violation of this Act.

=== Presidential Records Act ===
The Presidential Records Act mandates the preservation of all presidential records. Citizens for Responsibility and Ethics in Washington and The Wall Street Journal contend that the missing emails may constitute a violation of this Act.

== See also ==
- Henry H. Kennedy, Jr.
- Hillary Clinton email controversy
