= Reading First =

American education program

Reading First is a federal education program in the United States mandated under the No Child Left Behind Act and administered by the federal Department of Education. The program requires that schools funded by Reading First use "scientifically based" reading instruction.

Program funding is allocated to Title I Schools for "Scientifically Based Reading Research" (SBRR) and also for hiring "coaches," who assist teachers in learning the newest SBRR for use in classrooms. Coaches analyze data to drive instruction for individual children in every classroom. Reading First is limited to kindergarten through third-grade classes, while Early Reading First money is allocated for pre-kindergarten materials and coaches.

In September 2006, an internal review by the Department of Education's Office of Inspector General found the Reading First program exhibited conflicts of interest in that some of the consultants hired by the Department of Education to train teachers and state department of education personnel also were coauthors of certain reading programs. The review also suggested the department repeatedly tried to dictate which curriculum schools must use. The US Department of Education reacted to reports that some states believed that they should purchase certain reading programs with federal Reading First funds by publishing a statement for states that this was not the case and was not a requirement for federal funding. Still, the perception remained. The program also has many defenders. Some state departments of education and local school districts appreciate the federal support it provides.

A large-scale nationwide study of the program released in 2008 found that it does not improve students' reading comprehension, although testing in many states has found improvement in basic reading skills.
