= Hillary Clinton email controversy =

American political incident

During her tenure as the United States secretary of state, Hillary Clinton used a private email server for official public communications rather than using official State Department email accounts maintained on federal servers. After a years-long FBI investigation, it was determined that Clinton's server did not contain any information or emails that were clearly marked classified. Federal agencies did retrospectively determine that 100 emails contained information that should have been deemed classified at the time they were sent, including 65 emails deemed "Secret" and 22 deemed "Top Secret". An additional 2,093 emails were retroactively designated confidential by the State Department. "From the group of 30,000 e-mails returned to the State Department, 110 e-mails in 52 e-mail chains have been determined by the owning agency to contain classified information at the time they were sent or received. Eight of those chains contained information that was Top Secret at the time they were sent; 36 chains contained Secret information at the time; and eight contained Confidential information, which is the lowest level of classification." "Separately, it is important to say something about the marking of classified information. Only a very small number of the e-mails containing classified information bore markings indicating the presence of classified information."

Some experts, officials, and members of Congress contended that Clinton's use of a private email system and a private server violated federal law, specifically 18 U.S. Code § 1924, regarding the unauthorized removal and retention of classified documents or materials, as well as State Department protocols and procedures, and regulations governing recordkeeping. Clinton claimed that her use complied with federal laws and State Department regulations, and that former secretaries of state had also maintained personal email accounts (however Clinton was the only secretary of state to use a private server). News reports by NBC and CNN indicated that the emails discussed "innocuous" matters that were already public knowledge. At the time, conducting official business on private email systems was common among federal officials; John Kerry was the first Secretary of State to primarily use an official state.gov account, and previous administrations—including senior Bush officials who used private RNC servers—frequently relied on non-governmental systems.

The controversy was a major point of discussion and contention during the 2016 presidential election, in which Clinton was the Democratic nominee. In May, the State Department's Office of the Inspector General released a report about the State Department's email practices, including Clinton's. In July, FBI director James Comey announced that the FBI investigation had concluded that Clinton had been "extremely careless" but recommended that no charges be filed because Clinton did not act with criminal intent, the historical standard for pursuing prosecution. Gallup polls in 2016 found that the email controversy was the campaign news story Americans heard about the most.

On October 28, 2016, eleven days before the election, Comey notified Congress that the FBI had started looking into newly discovered emails. On November 6, Comey notified Congress that the FBI had not changed its conclusion. Comey's timing was contentious, with critics saying that he had violated Department of Justice guidelines and precedent, and prejudiced the public against Clinton. The controversy received more media coverage than any other topic during the presidential campaign. Clinton argues that the reopening of the investigation was one of the reasons for her loss in the election. Comey said in his 2018 book A Higher Loyalty that his decision may have been unconsciously influenced by the fact that he considered it extremely likely that Clinton would become the next president.

On June 14, 2018, the Department of Justice's Office of the Inspector General released its report on the FBI's and DOJ's handling of Clinton's investigation, finding no evidence of political bias and lending support for the decision to not prosecute Clinton. A three-year State Department investigation concluded in September 2019 that 38 individuals were "culpable" in 91 instances of sending classified information that reached Clinton's email account, though it found "no persuasive evidence of systemic, deliberate mishandling of classified information". Yet a September 2022 "Fact Checker" analysis by The Washington Post, which followed a tweet by Clinton claiming, "I had zero emails that were classified", also quotes the same 2019 State Department report as having noted, "None of the emails at issue in this review were marked as classified."

== Background ==
=== Clinton's use of BlackBerrys ===
Hillary Clinton holding a BlackBerry phone in 2009

Prior to her appointment as Secretary of State in 2009, Clinton and her circle of friends and colleagues communicated via BlackBerry phones. State Department security personnel suggested this would pose a security risk during her tenure. The email account used on Clinton's BlackBerry was then hosted on a private server in the basement of her home in Chappaqua, New York, but that information was not disclosed to State Department security personnel or senior State Department personnel.

Setting up a secure desktop computer in her office was suggested, but Clinton was unfamiliar with their use and opted for the convenience of her BlackBerry, not the State Department and government protocol of a secured desktop computer. Efforts to find a secure solution were abandoned by Clinton, and she was warned by State Department security personnel about the vulnerability of an unsecured BlackBerry to hacking. She affirmed her knowledge of the danger, and was reportedly told that the Bureau of Diplomatic Security had obtained intelligence about her vulnerability while she was on a trip to Asia, but continued to use her BlackBerry outside her office.

=== Domain names and email server ===
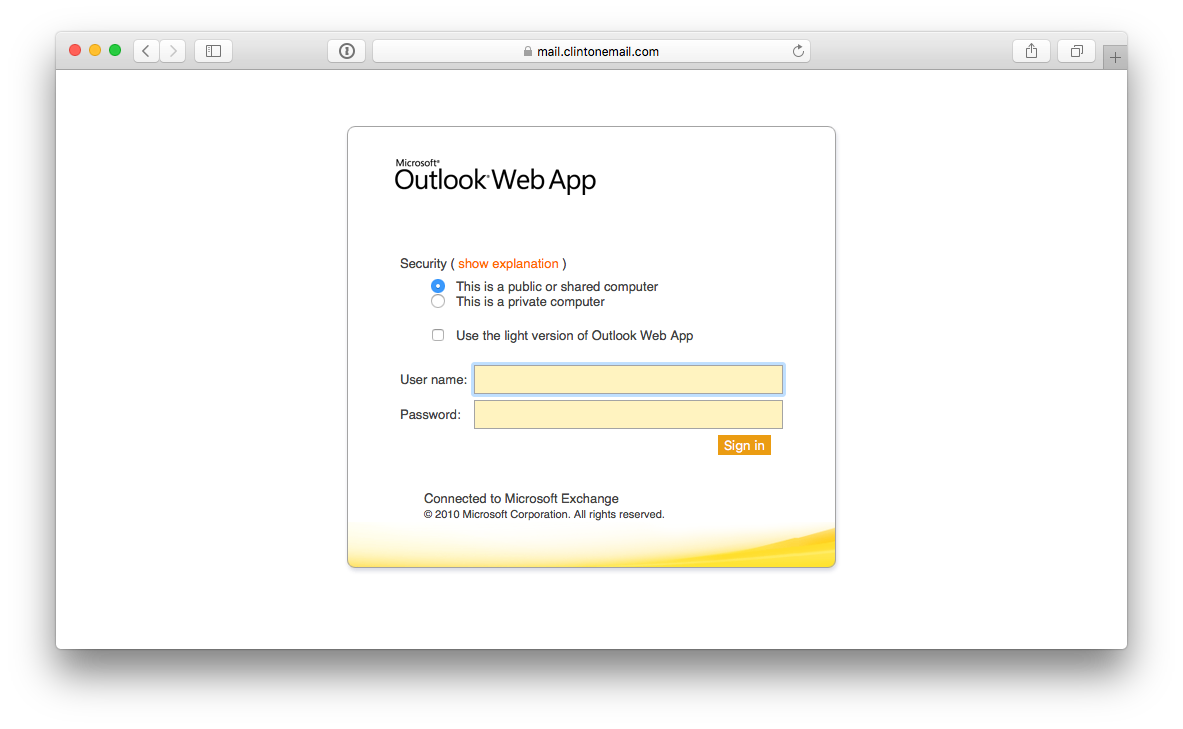
A screenshot of the default Outlook Web App login page that is displayed when navigating to Clinton's email service

At the time of Senate confirmation hearings on Hillary Clinton's nomination as Secretary of State, the domain names clintonemail.com, wjcoffice.com, and presidentclinton.com were registered to Eric Hoteham, with the home of Clinton and her husband in Chappaqua, New York, as the contact address. The domains were pointed to a private email server that Clinton (who never had a state.gov email account) used to send and receive email, and which was purchased and installed in the Clintons' home for her 2008 presidential campaign.

The email server was located in the Clintons' home in Chappaqua, New York, from January 2009 until 2013, when it was sent to a data center in New Jersey before being handed over to Platte River Networks, a Denver-based information technology firm that Clinton hired to manage her email system.

The server itself runs a Microsoft Exchange 2010 server with access to emails over the internet being delivered by Outlook Web App. The web page is secured with a TLS certificate to allow information to be transmitted securely when using the website. However, for the first two months of its use—January 2009 through March 29, 2009—the web page was reportedly not secured with a TLS certificate, meaning that information transmitted using the service was unencrypted and may have been vulnerable to interception.

=== Initial awareness ===
As early as 2009, officials with the National Archives and Records Administration (NARA) expressed concerns over possible violations of normal federal government record-keeping procedures at the State Department under then-Secretary Clinton.

In December 2012, near the end of Clinton's tenure as Secretary of State, a nonprofit group called Citizens for Responsibility and Ethics in Washington, or CREW, filed a FOIA request seeking records about her email. CREW received a response in May 2013: "no records responsive to your request were located." Emails sent to Clinton's private clintonemail.com address were first discovered in March 2013, when a hacker named "Guccifer" widely distributed emails sent to Clinton from Sidney Blumenthal, which Guccifer obtained by illegally accessing Blumenthal's email account. The emails dealt with the 2012 Benghazi attack and other issues in Libya and revealed the existence of her clintonemail.com address.

Blumenthal did not have a security clearance when he received material from Clinton that has since been characterized as classified by the State Department.

In the summer of 2014, lawyers from the State Department noticed a number of emails from Clinton's personal account, while reviewing documents requested by the House Select Committee on Benghazi. A request by the State Department for additional emails led to negotiations with her lawyers and advisors. In October, the State Department sent letters to Clinton and all previous Secretaries of State back to Madeleine Albright requesting emails and documents related to their work while in office. On December 5, 2014, Clinton lawyers delivered 12 file boxes filled with printed paper containing more than 30,000 emails. Clinton withheld almost 32,000 emails deemed to be of a personal nature. Datto, Inc., which provided data backup service for Clinton's email, agreed to give the FBI the hardware that stored the backups.

As of May 2016, no answer had been provided to the public as to whether 31,000 emails deleted by Hillary Clinton as personal have been or could be recovered.

A March 2, 2015 New York Times article broke the story that the Benghazi panel had discovered that Clinton exclusively used her own private email server rather than a government-issued one throughout her time as Secretary of State, and that her aides took no action to preserve emails sent or received from her personal accounts as required by law. At that point, Clinton announced that she had asked the State Department to release her emails. Some in the media labeled the controversy "emailgate."

== Use of private server for government business ==
According to Clinton's spokesperson Nick Merrill, a number of government officials have used private email accounts for official business, including secretaries of state before Clinton, but none have set up their own private domain to house their private email account.

State Department spokesperson Marie Harf said that: "For some historical context, Secretary Kerry is the first secretary of state to rely primarily on a state.gov email account." John Wonderlich, a transparency advocate with the Sunlight Foundation, observed while many government officials used private email accounts, their use of private email servers was much rarer. A notable exception was during the George W. Bush administration, when dozens of senior White House officials conducted government business via approximately 22 million emails using accounts they had on a server owned by the Republican National Committee.

Dan Metcalfe, a former head of the Justice Department's Office of Information and Privacy, said this gave her even tighter control over her emails by not involving a third party such as Google and helped prevent their disclosure by Congressional subpoena. He added: "She managed successfully to insulate her official emails, categorically, from the FOIA, both during her tenure at State and long after her departure from it—perhaps forever," making it "a blatant circumvention of the FOIA by someone who unquestionably knows better."

According to Harf, use by government officials of personal email for government business is permissible under the Federal Records Act, so long as relevant official communications, including all work-related emails, are preserved by the agency. The Act (which was amended in late 2014 after Clinton left office to require that personal emails be transferred to government servers within 20 days) requires agencies to retain all official communications, including all work-related emails, and stipulates that government employees cannot destroy or remove relevant records. NARA regulations dictate how records should be created and maintained, require that they must be maintained "by the agency" and "readily found," and that the records must "make possible a proper scrutiny by the Congress." Section 1924 of Title 18 of the United States Code addresses the deletion and retention of classified documents, under which "knowingly" removing or housing classified information at an "unauthorized location" is subject to a fine, or up to a year in prison.

Experts such as Metcalfe agree that these practices are allowed by federal law assuming that the material is not supposed to be classified, or at least these practices are allowed in case of emergencies, but they discourage these practices, believing that official email accounts should be used.

Jason R. Baron, the former head of litigation at NARA, described the practice as "highly unusual" but not a violation of the law. In a separate interview, he said, "It is very difficult to conceive of a scenario—short of nuclear winter—where an agency would be justified in allowing its cabinet-level head officer to solely use a private email communications channel for the conduct of government business." Baron told the Senate Judiciary Committee in May 2015 that "any employee's decision to conduct all email correspondence through a private email network, using a non-.gov address, is inconsistent with long-established policies and practices under the Federal Records Act and NARA regulations governing all federal agencies."

=== May 2016 report from State Department's inspector general ===
In May 2016, the Department's Office of the Inspector General Steve A. Linick released an 83-page report about the State Department's email practices. The Inspector General was unable to find evidence that Clinton had ever sought approval from the State Department staff for her use of a private email server, determining that if Clinton had sought approval, Department staff would have declined her setup because of the "security risks in doing so." Aside from security risks, the report stated that "she did not comply with the Department's policies that were implemented in accordance with the Federal Records Act." Each of these findings contradicted what Clinton and her aides had been saying up to that point. The report also stated that Clinton and her senior aides declined to speak with the investigators, while the previous four Secretaries of State did so.

The report also reviewed the practices of several previous Secretaries of State and concluded that the department's record keeping practices were subpar for many years. The Inspector General criticized Clinton's use of private email for Department business, concluding that it was "not an appropriate method" of document preservation and did not follow department policies that aim to comply with federal record laws. The report also criticized Colin Powell, who used a personal email account for business, saying that this violated some of the same Department policies. State Department spokesman Mark Toner said the report emphasized the need for federal agencies to adapt "decades-old record-keeping practices to the email-dominated modern era" and said that the Department's record-retention practices had been improved under the President Obama's second Secretary of State John F. Kerry, Clinton's successor. The report also notes that the rules for preserving work-related emails were updated in 2009.

Inspector General Linick wrote that he "found no evidence that staff in the Office of the Legal Adviser reviewed or approved Secretary Clinton's personal system," and also found that multiple State employees who raised concerns regarding Clinton's server were told that the Office of the Legal Adviser had approved it, and were further told to "never speak of the Secretary's personal email system again."

Clinton campaign spokesman Brian Fallon issued a statement saying: "The report shows that problems with the State Department's electronic record-keeping systems were long-standing" and that Clinton "took steps that went much further than others to appropriately preserve and release her records." However, the Associated Press said, "The audit did note that former Secretary of State Colin Powell had also exclusively used a private email account. ... But the failings of Clinton were singled out in the audit as being more serious than her predecessor." The report stated that "By Secretary Clinton's tenure, the department's guidance was considerably more detailed and more sophisticated, Secretary Clinton's cybersecurity practices accordingly must be evaluated in light of these more comprehensive directives."

== Server security and hacking attempts ==
=== Encryption and security ===
In 2008, before Hillary Clinton became Secretary of State, Justin Cooper, a longtime aide to Clinton's husband, former President Bill Clinton, managed the system. Cooper had no security clearance or expertise in computer security. Later, Bryan Pagliano, the former IT director for Clinton's 2008 presidential campaign, was hired to maintain their private email server while Clinton was Secretary of State. Pagliano had invoked the Fifth Amendment during congressional questioning about Clinton's server. In early 2016, he was granted immunity by the Department of Justice in exchange for cooperation with prosecutors. A Clinton spokesman said her campaign was "pleased" Pagliano was now cooperating with prosecutors. As of May 2016, the State Department remained unable to locate most of Pagliano's work-related emails from the period when he was employed by that department under Secretary Clinton.

Security experts such as Chris Soghoian believe that emails to and from Clinton may have been at risk of hacking and foreign surveillance. Marc Maiffret, a cybersecurity expert, said that the server had "amateur hour" vulnerabilities. For the first two months after Clinton was appointed Secretary of State and began accessing mail on the server through her BlackBerry, transmissions to and from the server were apparently not encrypted. On March 29, 2009, a digital certificate was obtained which would have permitted encryption.

Former Director of the Defense Intelligence Agency Michael T. Flynn, former United States Secretary of Defense Robert Gates, and former deputy director of the Central Intelligence Agency Michael Morell have said that it is likely that foreign governments were able to access the information on Clinton's server. Michael Hayden, former Director of the National Security Agency, Principal Deputy Director of National Intelligence, and Director of the Central Intelligence Agency said "I would lose all respect for a whole bunch of foreign intelligence agencies if they weren't sitting back, paging through the emails."

=== Hacking attempts ===
Clinton's server was configured to allow users to connect openly from the Internet and control it remotely using Microsoft's Remote Desktop Services.

It is known that hackers were aware of Clinton's non-public email address as early as 2011. Secretary Clinton and her staff were aware of hacking attempts in 2011, and were reportedly worried about them.

In 2012, according to server records, a hacker in Serbia scanned Clinton's Chappaqua server at least twice, in August and in December 2012. It was unclear whether the hacker knew the server belonged to Clinton, although it did identify itself as providing email services for clintonemail.com. During 2014, Clinton's server was the target of repeated intrusions originating in Germany, China, and South Korea. Threat monitoring software on the server blocked at least five such attempts. The software was installed in October 2013, and for three months prior to that, no such software had been installed.

According to Pagliano, security logs of Clinton's email server showed no evidence of successful hacking. The New York Times reported that "forensic experts can sometimes spot sophisticated hacking that is not apparent in the logs, but computer security experts view logs as key documents when detecting hackers," adding the logs "bolster Mrs. Clinton's assertion that her use of a personal email account ... did not put American secrets into the hands of hackers or foreign governments."

In 2013, Romanian hacker Marcel Lehel Lazăr (aka "Guccifer") distributed private memos from Sidney Blumenthal to Clinton on events in Libya that he had acquired by hacking Blumenthal's email account. In 2016, Lazăr was extradited from Romania to the U.S. to face unrelated federal charges related to his hacking into the accounts of a number of high-profile U.S. figures, pleading guilty to these charges. While detained pending trial, Lazăr claimed to the media that he had successfully hacked Clinton's server, but provided no proof of this claim. Officials associated with the investigation told the media that they found no evidence supporting Lazăr's assertion, and Clinton press secretary Brian Fallon said "There is absolutely no basis to believe the claims made by this criminal from his prison cell." FBI Director James Comey later stated in a congressional hearing that Guccifer admitted his claim was a lie.

According to security researchers at Secureworks the email leak was caused by Threat Group-4127, later attributed to Fancy Bear, a unit that targets governments, military, and international non-governmental organizations. The researchers report moderate confidence that the unit gathers intelligence on behalf of the Russian government.

== Deletion of emails ==
In 2014, months prior to public knowledge of the server's existence, Clinton chief of staff Cheryl Mills and two attorneys worked to identify work-related emails on the server to be archived and preserved for the State Department. Upon completion of this task in December 2014, Mills instructed Clinton's computer services provider, Platte River Networks (PRN), to change the server's retention period to 60 days, allowing 31,830 older personal emails to be automatically deleted from the server, as Clinton had decided she no longer needed them. However, the PRN technician assigned for this task failed to carry it out at that time.

After the existence of the server became publicly known on March 2, 2015, the Select Committee on Benghazi issued a subpoena for Benghazi-related emails two days later. Mills sent an email to PRN on March 9 mentioning the committee's retention request. The PRN technician then had what he described to the FBI as an "oh shit moment," realizing he had not set the personal emails to be deleted as instructed months earlier. The technician then erased the emails using a free utility, BleachBit, sometime between March 25 and 31. Bloomberg News reported in September 2015 that the FBI had recovered some of the deleted emails.

Since this episode, Clinton critics have accused her or her aides of deleting emails that were under subpoena, alleging the server had been "bleached" or "acid-washed" by a "very expensive" process in an effort to destroy evidence, with candidate Donald Trump stating the day before the 2016 election that "Hillary Clinton erased more than 30,000 emails as part of a cover-up." Trump reiterated his position as late as August 2018, asking "Look at the crimes that Clinton did with the emails and she deletes 33,000 emails after she gets a subpoena from Congress, and this Justice Department does nothing about it?"

Trump has also alleged that Clinton smashed her phones with a hammer to destroy evidence that was under subpoena. The FBI found that Clinton tech support aide Jason Cooper had hammered two old Clinton phones that had been taken out of service, an effective method to ensure that data on a phone is rendered unrecoverable, but there was no evidence Cooper did this in response to a subpoena. Cooper told the House Oversight Committee that when he upgraded Clinton's phones to a newer model, he would first transfer and back up data from the old phone before destroying it.

On May 23, 2022, Trump noted how Clinton's attorney had taken the blame for the missing emails, while at the same time criticizing Clinton on the campaign trail for her use of the email server, making it, as reporters Adam Edelman, Allan Smith and Amanda Terkel noted "central to his candidacy" As Evan Corcoran paraphrased it in his 2023 testimony to federal investigators, which was released with the attorney's name redacted, Trump had said:

"[Attorney], he was great, he did a great job. You know what? He said, he said that it—that it was him. That he was the one who deleted all of her emails, the 30,000 emails, because they basically dealt with her scheduling and her going to the gym and her having beauty appointments. And he was great. And he, so she didn't get in any trouble because he said that he was the one who deleted them."

== Classified information in emails ==
In various interviews, Clinton has said that "I did not send classified material, and I did not receive any material that was marked or designated classified." However, in June and July 2016, a number of news outlets reported that Clinton's emails did include messages with some paragraphs marked with a "(c)" for "Confidential." The FBI investigation found that 110 messages contained information that was classified at the time it was sent. Sixty-five of those emails were found to contain information classified as "Secret;" more than 20 contained "Top-Secret" information. Three emails, out of 30,000, were found to be marked as classified, although they lacked classified headers and were only marked with a small "c" in parentheses, described as "portion markings" by Comey. He added it was possible Clinton was not "technically sophisticated" enough to understand what the three classified markings meant which is consistent with Clinton's claim that she wasn't aware of the meaning of such markings.

Clinton personally wrote 104 of the 2,093 emails that were retroactively found to contain information classified as "confidential." Of the remaining emails that were classified after they were sent, Clinton aide Jake Sullivan wrote the most, at 215.

According to the State Department, there were 2,093 email chains on the server that were retroactively marked as classified by the State Department as "Confidential," 65 as "Secret," and 22 as "Top Secret."

An interagency dispute arose during the investigation about what constitutes "classified" status when information acquired and considered "owned" by intelligence agencies is also independently and publicly available through "parallel reporting" by the press or others. In one reported instance, an email chain deemed by the intelligence community to contain classified information included a discussion of a New York Times article that reported on a CIA drone strike in Pakistan; despite wide public knowledge of the drone program, the CIA—as the "owning agency"—considers the very existence of its drone program to be classified in its entirety. Assistant Secretary of State for Legislative Affairs Julia Frifield noted, "When policy officials obtain information from open sources, 'think tanks,' experts, foreign government officials, or others, the fact that some of the information may also have been available through intelligence channels does not mean that the information is necessarily classified."

=== State Department inspector general reports and statements ===
A June 29, 2015, memorandum from the Inspector General of the State Department, Steve A. Linick, said that a review of the 55,000-page email release found "hundreds of potentially classified emails." A July 17, 2015, follow-up memo, sent jointly by Linick and the Intelligence Community (IC) inspector general, I. Charles McCullough III, to Under Secretary of State for Management Patrick F. Kennedy, stated that they had confirmed that several of the emails contained classified information that was not marked as classified, at least one of which was publicly released.

On July 24, 2015, Linick and McCullough said they had discovered classified information on Clinton's email account, but did not say whether Clinton sent or received the emails. Investigators from their office, searching a randomly chosen sample of 40 emails, found four that contained classified information that originated from U.S. intelligence agencies, including the Central Intelligence Agency (CIA) and the National Security Agency (NSA). Their statement said that the information they found was classified when sent, remained so as of their inspection, and "never should have been transmitted via an unclassified personal system."

In a separate statement in the form of a letter to Congress, McCullough said that he had made a request to the State Department for access to the entire set of emails turned over by Clinton, but that the department rejected his request. The letter stated that none of the emails were marked as classified, but because they included classified information they should have been marked and handled as such, and transmitted securely.

On August 10, 2015, the IC inspector general said that two of the 40 emails in the sample were "Top Secret/Sensitive Compartmented Information" and subsequently given classified labels of "TK" (for "Talent Keyhole" indicating material obtained by aerial or space-based imagery sources) and NOFORN. One is a discussion of a news article about a U.S. drone strike operation. The second, he said, either referred to classified material or else was "parallel reporting" of open-source intelligence, which might still be classified by the government "owning agency" that sourced the information by secret means even though the same information was also available to the public. Clinton's presidential campaign and the State Department disputed the letter, and questioned whether the emails had been over-classified by an arbitrary process. According to an unnamed source, a secondary review by the CIA and the National Geospatial-Intelligence Agency endorsed the earlier inspectors general findings concluding that the emails (one of which concerned North Korea's nuclear weapons program) were "Top Secret" when received by Clinton through her private server in 2009 and 2011, a conclusion also disputed by the Clinton campaign.

The IC inspector general issued another letter to Congress on January 14, 2016. In this letter he stated that an unnamed intelligence agency had made a sworn declaration that "several dozen emails [had been] determined by the IC element to be at the CONFIDENTIAL, SECRET, and TOP SECRET/SAP levels." Other intelligence officials added that the several dozen were not the two emails from the previous sample and that the clearance of the IC inspector general himself had to be upgraded before he could learn about the programs referenced by the emails. NBC News reported on January 20, 2016, that senior American officials described these emails as "innocuous" because—although they discussed the CIA drone program that is technically classified TOP SECRET/SAP—the existence of the CIA drone program had been widely known and discussed in the public domain for years. These officials characterized the IC inspector general as unfair in how he had handled the issue.

On January 29, 2016, the State Department announced that 22 documents from Clinton's email server would not be released because they contained highly classified information that was too sensitive for public consumption. At the same time, the State Department announced that it was initiating its own investigation into whether the server contained information that was classified at the time it was sent or received.

In February 2016, State Department IG Linick addressed another report to Under Secretary of State Kennedy, stating his office had also found classified material in 10 emails in the personal email accounts of members of former Secretary Condoleezza Rice's staff and in two emails in the personal email account of former Secretary of State Colin Powell. None of the emails were classified for intelligence reasons. PolitiFact found a year earlier that Powell was the only former secretary of state to use a personal email account. In February 2016, Clinton's campaign chairman issued a statement claiming that her emails, like her predecessors,' were "being inappropriately subjected to over-classification."

=== FBI investigation ===
==== July 2015 – Security referral ====
The State Department and Intelligence Community (IC) inspector generals' discovery of four emails containing classified information, out of a random sample of 40, prompted them to make a security referral to the FBI's counterintelligence office, to alert authorities that classified information was being kept on Clinton's server and by her lawyer on a thumb drive. As part of the FBI's Midyear investigation (code name "Midyear Exam"), at the request of the IC inspector general, Clinton agreed to turn over her email server to the U.S. Department of Justice, as well as thumb drives containing copies of her work-related emails. Other emails were obtained by the United States House Select Committee on Benghazi from other sources, in connection with the committee's inquiry. Clinton's own emails are being made public in stages by the State Department on a gradual schedule.

The New York Times ran a front-page story on July 24, 2015, with the headline "Criminal Inquiry Sought In Clinton's Use of Email," with the lead sentence stating, "Two inspectors general have asked the Justice Department to open a criminal investigation into whether Hillary Rodham Clinton mishandled sensitive government information on a private email account she used as secretary of state, senior government officials said Thursday." Shortly after the publication of the story, the Inspectors General of the Intelligence Community and the Department of State issued a statement clarifying, "An important distinction is that the IC IG did not make a criminal referral—it was a security referral made for counterintelligence purposes." The Times later made two corrections, first that Clinton was not a specific target of the referral, then later that the referral was not "criminal" in nature.

Clinton's IT contractors turned over her personal email server to the FBI on August 12, 2015, as well as thumb drives containing copies of her emails.

In a letter describing the matter to Senator Ron Johnson, Chairman of the Senate Homeland Security Committee, Clinton's lawyer David E. Kendall said that emails, and all other data stored on the server, had earlier been erased prior to the device being turned over to the authorities, and that both he and another lawyer had been given security clearances by the State Department to handle thumb drives containing about 30,000 emails that Clinton subsequently also turned over to authorities. Kendall said the thumb drives had been stored in a safe provided to him in July by the State Department.

==== August 2015 – Investigation continues; email recovery ====
On August 20, 2015, U.S. District Judge Emmet G. Sullivan stated that Hillary Clinton's actions of maintaining a private email server were in direct conflict with U.S. government policy. "We wouldn't be here today if this employee had followed government policy," he said, and ordered the State Department to work with the FBI to determine if any emails on the server during her tenure as Secretary of State could be recovered.

Platte River Networks, the Denver-based firm that managed the Clinton server since 2013, said it had no knowledge of the server being wiped. "Platte River has no knowledge of the server being wiped," company spokesman Andy Boian told the Washington Post. "All the information we have is that the server wasn't wiped." When asked by the Washington Post, the Clinton campaign declined to comment.

In September 2015, FBI investigators were engaged in sorting messages recovered from the server. In November 2015, the FBI expanded its inquiry to examine whether Clinton or her aides jeopardized national security secrets, and if so, who should be held responsible.

Conflicting media sources sized the FBI investigation from 12 to 30 agents as of March 2016.

==== May–July 2016 – Public statements ====
In May 2016, FBI Director James Comey said he was "not familiar with the term 'security inquiry'" as the Clinton campaign was characterizing the probe, adding that the word investigation is "in our name" and "We're conducting an investigation ... That's what we do. That's probably all I can say about it." Comey noted in his 2018 memoir that he did not publicly contradict Clinton's characterization of the investigation as a "security inquiry" while it was underway despite being directly prompted by a reporter to do so in May 2016. In April 2017 it became known that the FBI had, in fact, opened a criminal investigation on July 10, 2015, telling The New York Times they had received a "criminal referral," although the following day they issued a public statement: "The department has received a referral related to the potential compromise of classified information. It is not a criminal referral."

In late June 2016, it was reported that Bill Clinton met privately with Attorney General Loretta Lynch on her private plane on the tarmac at Phoenix Sky Harbor International Airport. Officials indicated that the 30 minute meeting took place when Clinton became aware that Lynch's plane was on the same tarmac at the airport. When the meeting became public, Lynch stated that it was "primarily social" and "there was no discussion of any matter pending for the department or any matter pending for any other body." Lynch was criticized for her involvement in the meeting and was called on by some critics to recuse herself from involvement in the FBI's investigation of the email case. In response, she stated "The F.B.I. is investigating whether Mrs. Clinton, her aides or anyone else broke the law by setting up a private email server for her to use as secretary of state," but "the case will be resolved by the same team that has been working on it from the beginning" and "I will be accepting their recommendations."

On July 1, 2016, the New York Times reported in the name of a "Justice Department official" that Attorney General Loretta Lynch will accept "whatever recommendation career prosecutors and the F.B.I. director make about whether to bring charges related to Hillary Clinton's personal email server."

Clinton maintained she did not send or receive any confidential emails from her personal server. In a Democratic debate with Bernie Sanders on February 4, 2016, Clinton said, "I never sent or received any classified material." In a Meet the Press interview on July 2, 2016, she stated: "Let me repeat what I have repeated for many months now, I never received nor sent any material that was marked classified."

==== July 2016 – Investigation concludes and perjury referral ====
On July 5, 2016, FBI Director Comey announced in a statement he read to press and television reporters at FBI headquarters in Washington, DC, that the FBI had completed its investigation and was referring it to the Justice Department with the recommendation "that no charges are appropriate in this case." He added, "Although there is evidence of potential violations of the statutes regarding the handling of classified information, our judgment is that no reasonable prosecutor would bring such a case."

With regard to mishandling of classified information, Comey said, "there is evidence that they [Clinton and her team] were extremely careless in their handling of very sensitive, highly classified information." The investigation found 110 emails that should have been regarded as classified at the time they were sent; another 2,000 emails were retroactively classified which means they were not classified at the time they were sent. Comey said that "any reasonable person in Secretary Clinton's position, or in the position of those government employees with whom she was corresponding ... should have known that an unclassified system was no place for that conversation."

The FBI learned that Clinton used her personal email extensively while outside the United States, both sending and receiving work-related emails in the territory of sophisticated adversaries. The FBI did not find "direct evidence that Secretary Clinton's personal e-mail domain ... was successfully hacked;" they assessed it "possible that hostile actors gained access" to it. Investigators found that State Department employees often used private emails to conduct business. Comey noted, "We also developed evidence that the security culture of the State Department in general, and with respect to use of unclassified e-mail systems in particular, was generally lacking in the kind of care for classified information found elsewhere in the government."

On July 6, 2016, Lynch confirmed that the investigation into Hillary Clinton's use of private email servers while secretary of state would be closed without criminal charges.

On July 10, 2016, Jason Chaffetz and chairman Bob Goodlatte referred Clinton to the U.S. attorney for the District of Columbia to investigate whether Clinton lied to congress about her use of a private email server.

The New York Times reported in April 2017 that during the investigation the FBI was provided documents acquired by Dutch intelligence hackers which had previously been stolen by Russian intelligence. The classified documents were purported to be written by a Democratic operative who asserted Lynch would not allow the Clinton investigation to go too far, though it was not clear if the writer actually had insight into Lynch's thinking. The Times reported the documents raised concerns by Comey that if Lynch announced the closure of the investigation, and Russia subsequently released the document, it would cause some to suspect political interference. This reportedly led Comey, a longtime Republican, to decide to announce the closure himself, though some in the Obama Justice Department were skeptical of this account. In June 2021 it became known that the Trump Justice department had acquired by court order the phone logs of the four Times reporters who had written the article together, as part of a leak investigation.

==== October 2016 – Additional investigation ====
In early October 2016, FBI criminal investigators working on a case involving former Congressman Anthony Weiner sending sexually explicit texts to a fifteen-year-old girl discovered emails from Weiner's estranged wife, Huma Abedin, vice chair of Hillary Clinton's 2016 presidential campaign, that they considered potentially relevant to the Clinton server investigation.

On October 26, 2016, two days before FBI director James Comey announced he was reopening the investigation into Hillary Clinton's email, Rudy Giuliani told Fox News:

"I think [Donald Trump has] got a surprise or two that you're going to hear about in the next few days. I mean, I'm talking about some pretty big surprises… We've got a couple of things up our sleeve that should turn this thing around."

FBI officials reportedly decided to disclose the development despite its potential effect on the pending presidential election to preempt the possibility that it would be leaked in another way.

On October 28, 2016, Comey informed Congress that "in connection with an unrelated case, the FBI has learned of the existence of emails that appear pertinent to the investigation." He said the FBI will take "appropriate investigative steps designed to allow investigators to review these emails to determine whether they contain classified information, as well as to assess their importance to our investigation." He added that the FBI "cannot yet assess whether or not this material may be significant." The FBI obtained a new search warrant to allow them to review Abedin's emails.

Comey informed Congress of this additional investigation despite having been advised by Justice Department officials that such an announcement would violate department policies and procedures, including a policy not to comment on investigations close to an election. Comey later explained, in a letter to FBI employees, "We don't ordinarily tell Congress about ongoing investigations, but here I feel an obligation to do so given that I testified repeatedly in recent months that our investigation was completed." Law enforcement sources added that he feared he would be accused of concealing relevant information if he did not disclose it.

News of this renewed investigation being revealed shortly before the U.S. presidential election led to the announcement being described as an "October surprise," and prompted statements from both the Democratic and Republican campaigns. Donald Trump repeated his characterization that Hillary Clinton's email usage as secretary of state was "worse than Watergate." Clinton called for the FBI to immediately release all information about the newly discovered emails and said she was confident the FBI would not change its earlier conclusion that there is no basis for criminal prosecution. Senator Dianne Feinstein (D-CA) said she was "shocked" by the letter, saying it "played right into the political campaign of Donald Trump."

On November 4, 2016, Giuliani was asked about his October 26, 2016 comments on Fox News:

STEVE DOOCY: Two – a couple days before this all broke, you're on with Martha McCallum, and you looked at Martha and go, well look out, something's coming down, and certainly it did. What did you know? And a lot of other networks are pointing that out.

RUDY GIULIANI: Well, it's very simple.

BRIAN KILMEADE: - as if you were part of that?

RUDY GIULIANI: I'm not part of it at all. All I heard were former FBI agents telling me that there's a revolution going on inside the FBI and it's now at a boiling point.

James Comey testified to the House Intelligence Committee that he opened an investigation into the leaks coming from the New York office:

"I was concerned that there appeared to be in the media a number of stories that might have been based on communications reporters or nonreporters like Rudy Giuliani were having with people in the New York field office. In particular,… Mr. Giuliani was making statements that appeared to be based on his knowledge of workings inside the FBI New York. And… there were other stories that were in the same ballpark that gave me a general concern that we may have a leak problem… out of New York, and so I asked that it be investigated."

In a letter to the Department of Justice requesting information after the arrest of former FBI New York Field Office Senior Agent Charles McGonigal, Senator Sheldon Whitehouse wrote,

"Because McGonigal was the Special Agent in Charge of the FBI's New York Field Office counterintelligence division in the weeks leading to the 2016 election, he may have knowledge of or have participated in political activities to damage then-candidate Hillary Clinton and help then-candidate Donald Trump. For instance, during that time period, Rudy Giuliani announced that a "big surprise" related to Secretary Clinton would be forthcoming from the FBI, hinting he received that information from the New York Field Office.1 The very next day, Director James Comey, reportedly bowing to internal pressure from that office, broke the FBI's ordinary policy of declining to comment on ongoing matters close to an election and announced the FBI would reopen its investigation into Secretary Clinton's use of a private email server."

On November 6, in another letter to Congress, Comey stated that, after working "around the clock" to review all of the newly discovered emails, the FBI had not changed the conclusion it reached in July. An unnamed government official added that the newly discovered emails turned out to be either personal or duplicates of emails previously reviewed, and that Comey's letter represents a conclusion of the investigation. The following day, stock and currency markets around the world surged in response.

On November 12, during a conference call to top donors, Hillary Clinton attributed her presidential election loss to Comey's announcements, saying they stopped her momentum. In January 2017, the US Justice Department started an investigation of Comey's announcements. A 2019 study found that Comey's letter substantially increased Trump's probability of winning the 2016 election. Using also state-level statistics, political operative and lawyer Lanny J. Davis argues in his book that Comey's letter to Congress, just mere days ahead of the 2016 presidential election, significantly swifted voters away from Hillary Clinton, ultimately leading to Trump's Electoral College victory. Another study reveals that Comey's letter correlates with the most significant surge in Trump's popularity during the 2016 campaign. This work also finds that, upon the emails case's re-closure, Hillary's popularity rebounded, albeit to a lesser extent, indicating that at least some of the damage from Comey's letter remained irreversible.

=== Senate probes Loretta Lynch interference ===
According to Comey's June 8, 2017 testimony to the Senate Intelligence Committee, then-Attorney General Loretta Lynch had asked him to downplay the investigation into Clinton's emails by calling it a "matter" rather than an investigation. He said the request "confused and concerned" him. He added that Lynch's tarmac meeting with Bill Clinton also influenced his decision to publicly announce the results of the FBI probe.

On June 23, 2017, several members of the Senate Judiciary Committee opened a bipartisan inquiry into whether former Attorney General Lynch interfered in the FBI's investigation into Hillary Clinton's use of a private email server.

=== Internal State Department investigation ===
On July 7, 2016, the State Department resumed its review of whether classified information had been mishandled. The review had been suspended until the completion of the Justice Department investigation. The United States Department of State finished its investigation in September 2019, citing 588 security violations. The review found that 38 current and former State Department officials—some of whom may be punished—were culpable of mishandling classified information, but in 497 cases the culpability could not be established. The material was considered classified then or later, but none of the violations involved information marked classified. The investigation found Clinton's use of personal email server increased the risk of compromising State Department information, but "there was no persuasive evidence of systemic, deliberate mishandling of classified information".

=== Department of Justice Inspector General's report ===
The Inspector General of the Department of Justice (IG) launched an investigation into how the DOJ and FBI had handled the investigation into Clinton's email. On June 14, 2018, the IG issued a report that was highly critical of Comey's actions. Regarding his July press conference, in which he criticized Clinton even while announcing the investigation was over, the IG said it was "extraordinary and insubordinate for Comey to conceal his intentions (about the press conference) from his superiors," and that "we found none of his reasons to be a persuasive basis for deviating from well-established Department policies." Comey's October decision to send a letter notifying Congress that the investigation had been re-opened one week before the election was described as "ad-hoc" and "a serious error in judgment." However, in June 2018 the IG concluded that the decision to not prosecute Clinton was not affected by bias and "was consistent with the Department's historical approach in prior cases under different leadership, including in the 2008 decision not to prosecute former Attorney General Alberto Gonzales for mishandling classified documents."

The IG report also commented on "highly classified information" in a purported Russian intelligence document obtained by the FBI that included an unconfirmed allegation that Attorney General Loretta Lynch assured a Clinton staffer that she would prevent the FBI investigation from digging too deeply into Clinton's affairs. The FBI long considered the document unreliable and a possible forgery, and Comey told IG investigators he knew the information was not true. The IG report stated: "Comey said that he became concerned that the information about Lynch would taint the public's perception of the [Clinton] investigation if it leaked, particularly after DCLeaks and Guccifer 2.0 began releasing hacked emails in mid-June 2016," explaining why Comey chose to bypass Lynch and deputy AG Sally Yates to announce the FBI investigation findings himself. The Washington Post also stated that "current and former officials" told them that Comey relied on the questionable document in making his July decision to announce on his own without his superiors approval that the investigation was over.

=== Opinions of journalists and experts ===
According to the New York Times, if Clinton was a recipient of classified emails, "it is not clear that she would have known that they contained government secrets, since they were not marked classified." The newspaper reported that "most specialists believe the occasional appearance of classified information in the Clinton account was probably of marginal consequence". Steven Aftergood, director of the Project on Government Secrecy at the Federation of American Scientists, said that inadvertent "spillage" of classified information into an unclassified realm is a common occurrence.

Reuters' August 2015 review of a set of released emails found "at least 30 email threads from 2009, representing scores of individual emails," which include what the State Department identifies as "foreign government information," defined by the U.S. government as "any information, written or spoken, provided in confidence to U.S. officials by their foreign counterparts." Although unmarked, Reuters' examination appeared to suggest that these emails "were classified from the start." J. William Leonard, a former director of the NARA Information Security Oversight Office, said that such information is "born classified" and that "[I]f a foreign minister just told the secretary of state something in confidence, by U.S. rules that is classified at the moment it's in U.S. channels and U.S. possession." According to Reuters, the standard U.S. government nondisclosure agreement "warns people authorized to handle classified information that it may not be marked that way and that it may come in oral form." The State Department "disputed Reuters' analysis" but declined to elaborate.

The Associated Press reported, "Some officials said they believed the designations were a stretch—a knee-jerk move in a bureaucracy rife with over-classification." Jeffrey Toobin, in an August 2015 New Yorker article, wrote that the Clinton email affair is an illustration of overclassification, a problem written about by Senator Daniel Patrick Moynihan in his book Secrecy: The American Experience. Toobin writes that "government bureaucracies use classification rules to protect turf, to avoid embarrassment, to embarrass rivals—in short, for a variety of motives that have little to do with national security." Toobin wrote that "It's not only the public who cannot know the extent or content of government secrecy. Realistically, government officials can't know either—and this is Hillary Clinton's problem. Toobin noted that "one of Clinton's potentially classified email exchanges is nothing more than a discussion of a newspaper story about drones" and wrote: "That such a discussion could be classified underlines the absurdity of the current system. But that is the system that exists, and if and when the agencies determine that she sent or received classified information through her private server, Clinton will be accused of mishandling national-security secrets."

In an analysis of the Clinton email controversy published by the Brookings Institution, Richard Lempert wrote that "security professionals have a reputation for erring in the direction of overclassification." Elizabeth Goitein, co-director of the liberty and national security program at the Brennan Center for Justice at New York University School of Law, says that "The odds are good that any classified information in the Clinton emails should not have been classified," since an estimated 50 percent to 90 percent of classified documents could be made public without risking national security. Nate Jones, an expert with the National Security Archive at George Washington University, said: "Clinton's mistreatment of federal records and the intelligence community's desire to retroactively overclassify are two distinct troubling problems. No politician is giving the right message: Blame Clinton for poor records practices, but don't embrace overclassification while you do it."

==== Russian intelligence and Comey's pronouncements ====
A number of journalists (Philip Ewing and Jane Mayer Karoun Demirjian and Devlin Barrett) have commented on the connection between the alleged Russian intelligence document given to the FBI that suggested Attorney General Loretta Lynch would prevent the FBI investigation from digging too deeply into Clinton's affairs (see above), and Comey's July announcement of the FBI investigation findings by himself without Lynch's permission, which was later called "extraordinary and insubordinate" by the Department of Justice Inspector General's report. "Current and former officials" told Washington Post reporters Demirjian and Barrett that "Comey relied on the document in making his July decision to announce on his own," because he feared its contents would be leaked, tainting the public's perception of the FBI investigation. This was despite the fact that Comey himself told investigators "he knew from the first moment" that the document "wasn't true" and the FBI was later unable to corroborate the document.

Ewing and Mayer note the document's effect on the election. According to Ewing, "to the degree" that the document "was intended to help disrupt the election, it worked". Jane Mayer describes the work of political scientist Kathleen Hall Jamieson who argues that Comey's "damaging public pronouncements" on Clinton's handling of classified e-mails" in July and later ten days before the election can "plausibly be attributed to Russian disinformation". While it is difficult to determine how many voters Clinton lost from the pronouncements, Mayer also quotes the Democratic ranking member of the House Intelligence Committee, Adam Schiff, who states that if "the fake intelligence" motivated Comey, then the document was "probably was the most measurable" and "the most significant way in which the Russians may have impacted the outcome of the election."

== House Oversight Committee hearing ==
On July 7, 2016, Comey was questioned for 5 hours by the United States House Committee on Oversight and Government Reform. Comey stated that there was "evidence of mishandling" of classified information and that he believed that Clinton was "extremely careless; I think she was negligent." He defended the FBI's recommendation against bringing charges because it "... would have been unfair and virtually unprecedented ..."

== Responses and analysis ==
=== Clinton's initial response ===
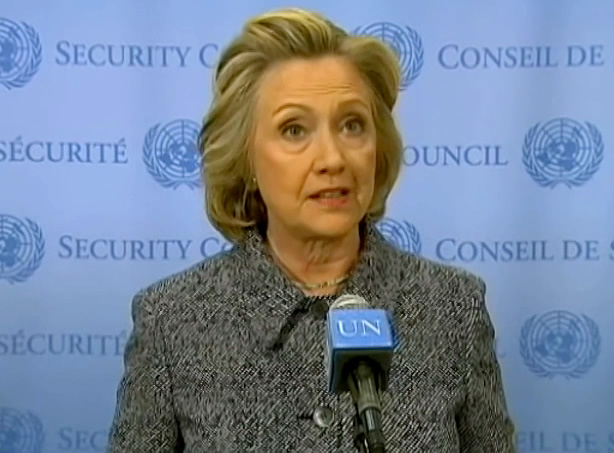
Clinton addressing email controversy with the media at the UN Headquarters on March 10, 2015

Clinton's spokesman Nick Merrill defended Clinton's usage of her personal server and email accounts as being in compliance with the "letter and spirit of the rules."

Clinton herself stated she had done so as a matter of "convenience."

On March 10, 2015, while attending a conference at the headquarters of the United Nations in Manhattan, Clinton spoke with reporters for about 20 minutes. Clinton said she had used a private email for convenience, "because I thought it would be easier to carry just one device for my work and for my personal emails instead of two." It was later determined that Clinton had used both an iPad and a BlackBerry while Secretary of State.

Clinton turned over copies of 30,000 State Department business-related emails from her private server that belonged in the public domain; she later explained that she instructed her lawyer to err on the side of disclosure, turning over any emails that might be work-related. Her aides subsequently deleted about 31,000 emails from the server dated during the same time period that Clinton regarded as personal and private. State Department employees do have the right to delete personal emails.

Clinton, a technophobe, sometimes used humor when taking questions from the press. In August 2015, when asked by a reporter whether she had "wiped" her server, Clinton laughed and said: "What? Like with a cloth or something? I don't know how it works digitally at all." In September 2015, Clinton was asked in an interview with Jimmy Fallon on The Tonight Show about the content of the emails. She laughed, saying there was nothing interesting and joked that she was offended people found her emails 'boring.'

==== Later responses ====
Clinton's responses to the question, made during her presidential campaign, evolved over time. Clinton initially said that there was no classified material on her server. Later, after a government review discovered some of her emails contained classified information, she said she never sent or received information that was marked classified. Her campaign claimed other emails contained information that is now classified, but was retroactively classified by U.S. intelligence agencies after Clinton had received the material. See also the section above on the May 2016 IG report for a number of Clinton statements that were contradicted by the report, and how she and her supporters responded afterward.

Campaign spokesman Brian Fallon said: "She was at worst a passive recipient of unwitting information that subsequently became deemed as classified." Clinton campaign spokeswoman Jennifer Palmieri has "stressed that Clinton was permitted to use her own email account as a government employee and that the same process concerning classification reviews would still be taking place had she used the standard 'state.gov' email account used by most department employees." Palmieri later stated: "Look, this kind of nonsense comes with the territory of running for president. We know it, Hillary knows it, and we expect it to continue from now until Election Day."

In her first national interview about the 2016 presidential race, on July 7, 2015, Clinton was asked by CNN's Brianna Keilar about her use of private email accounts while serving as Secretary of State. She said:

Everything I did was permitted. There was no law. There was no regulation. There was nothing that did not give me the full authority to decide how I was going to communicate. Previous secretaries of state have said they did the same thing ... Everything I did was permitted by law and regulation. I had one device. When I mailed anybody in the government, it would go into the government system.

On September 9, 2015, Clinton apologized during an ABC News interview for using the private server, saying she was "sorry for that." Appearing on NBC's Meet the Press on September 27, 2015, Clinton defended her use of the private email server while she was secretary of state, comparing the investigations to Republican-led probes of her husband's presidential administration more than two decades ago, saying, "It is like a drip, drip, drip. And that's why I said, there's only so much that I can control."

Clinton and the State Department said the emails were not marked classified when sent. However, Clinton signed a non-disclosure agreement which stated that classified material may be "marked or unmarked." Additionally, the author of an email is legally required to properly mark it as classified if it contains classified material, and to avoid sending classified material on a personal device, such as the ones used exclusively by Clinton.

In an interview with Fox News in late July 2016, Clinton stated "Director Comey said my answers were truthful, and what I've said is consistent with what I have told the American people, that there were decisions discussed and made to classify retroactively certain of the emails." The Washington Post awarded Clinton four "Pinocchios", its worst rating, for her statement saying "While Comey did say there was no evidence she lied to the FBI, that is not the same as saying she told the truth to the American public."

In her 2017 book What Happened?, Clinton argued that the email controversy and FBI Director James Comey's actions contributed to her loss, basing this claim heavily on a Gallup-Brookings study that found that the email scandal was the story poll respondents reported hearing the most about during the 2016 campaign. When it was eventually published in book form, the Gallup-Brookings study confirmed that email was the news story about Clinton that 2016 poll respondents most mentioned hearing about during the campaign in open-ended survey questions, but took no position on whether this caused Clinton's loss. A 2019 study in the journal Perspectives on Politics found little evidence to support the hypothesis that the email story caused Clinton's loss.

In 2019, Venice held its 58th Biennale of Visual Arts, which included "Hillary: The Hillary Clinton Emails." The exhibition, created by the American poet and artist Kenneth Goldsmith, curated by Francesco Urbano Ragazzi, was displayed from May 9 – November 24, 2019 in a balcony jutting out over a supermarket at the Despar Teatro Italia. When Clinton made a surprise visit on Tuesday September 10, 2019, she said that the attention given to her emails was one of the "strangest" and most "absurd" events in U.S. political history, adding, "Anyone can go in and look at them. There is nothing there. There is nothing that should have been so controversial."

=== Democratic response ===
In August 2015, the New York Times reported on "interviews with more than 75 Democratic governors, lawmakers, candidates and party members" on the email issue. The Times reported, "None of the Democrats interviewed went so far as to suggest that the email issue raised concerns about Mrs. Clinton's ability to serve as president, and many expressed a belief that it had been manufactured by Republicans in Congress and other adversaries." At the same time, many Democratic leaders showed increasing frustration among party leaders of Clinton's handling of the email issue. For example, Edward G. Rendell, former governor of Pennsylvania, a Clinton supporter, said that a failure of the Clinton campaign to get ahead of the issue early on meant that the campaign was "left just playing defense." Other prominent Democrats, such as Governor Dannel P. Malloy of Connecticut, were less concerned, noting the campaign was at an early stage and that attacks on Clinton were to be expected.

At the October 2015 primary debate, Clinton's chief rival for the Democratic presidential nomination, Senator Bernie Sanders of Vermont, defended Clinton, saying: "Let me say this. Let me say something that may not be great politics. But I think the secretary is right. And that is that the American people are sick and tired of hearing about your damn emails!" Sanders later clarified that he thought Clinton's emails were a "very serious issue," but Americans want a discussion on issues that are "real" to them, such as paid family and medical leave, college affordability, and campaign finance reform.

"But her emails!" became a meme during and following the 2016 election, often used in a joking or mocking way to the perceived damage done by the Trump administration. Clinton herself echoed the phrase in June 2018, when the Justice Department's Inspector General issued a report on how the investigation of her use of email was conducted. It revealed that FBI Director Comey had used a personal email account to conduct FBI business; Clinton's response was a Twitter comment, "But my emails!"

=== Republican response ===
Republican National Committee chairman Reince Priebus said, in a statement regarding the June 30, 2015 email releases, "These emails ... are just the tip of the iceberg, and we will never get full disclosure until Hillary Clinton releases her secret server for an independent investigation." Trey Gowdy said on June 29, 2015, that he would press the State Department for a fuller accounting of Clinton's emails, after the Benghazi panel retrieved 15 additional emails to Sidney Blumenthal that the department had not provided to the committee.

On September 12, 2015, Republican Senators Chuck Grassley and Ron Johnson, chairmen of the Senate Judiciary and Homeland Security committees, respectively, said they would seek an independent review of the deleted emails, if they were recovered from Clinton's server, to determine if there were any government related items among those deleted.

Special counsel John Durham and Trump administration officials cited manipulated emails mentioned in hacked Russian memos to posit that Clinton approved a "Clinton plan" to distract from the email controversy. The alleged "plan" has also been described as a conspiracy theory, and no support has been found that Clinton made false claims to unfairly tie Donald Trump to the Russian election interference efforts.

=== Comparisons and media coverage ===
Analyses by Columbia Journalism Review, the Berkman Klein Center for Internet and Society at Harvard University, and the Shorenstein Center at the Harvard Kennedy School show that the Clinton email controversy received more coverage in mainstream media outlets than any other topic during the 2016 presidential election. The New York Times coverage of the email controversy was notoriously extensive; according to a Columbia Journalism Review analysis, "in just six days, The New York Times ran as many cover stories about Hillary Clinton's emails as they did about all policy issues combined in the 69 days leading up to the election (and that does not include the three additional articles on October 18, and November 6 and 7, or the two articles on the emails taken from John Podesta)." In attempting to explain the lopsided coverage, the Columbia Journalism Review speculates, "In retrospect, it seems clear that the press in general made the mistake of assuming a Clinton victory was inevitable, and were setting themselves as credible critics of the next administration."

Media commentators drew comparisons of Clinton's email usage to past political controversies. Pacific Standard Magazine published an article in May 2015, comparing email controversy and her response to it with the Whitewater investigation 20 years earlier.

In August 2015, Washington Post associate editor and investigative journalist Bob Woodward, when asked about Clinton's handling of her emails, said they remind him of the Nixon tapes from the Watergate scandal. On March 9, 2015, liberal columnist and Clinton supporter Dana Milbank wrote that the email affair was "a needless, self-inflicted wound" brought about by "debilitating caution" in "trying to make sure an embarrassing e-mail or two didn't become public," which led to "obsessive secrecy." Milbank pointed out that Clinton herself had justifiably criticized the George W. Bush administration in 2007 for its "secret" White House email accounts.

On Fox News Sunday, political analyst Juan Williams contrasted the media coverage of Clinton's emails to the coverage of the 2007 Bush White House email controversy which he claimed received "just about zero press coverage." PolitiFact found Williams' assertion to be "mostly false," concluding "We found hundreds of articles and television transcripts referencing the issue. Still, Williams has something of a point that compared to the extensive recent coverage of Clinton's use of private email, media coverage of the 2007 Bush White House email controversy was thin."

The Milwaukee Journal Sentinel published an editorial opining that "the only believable reason for the private server in her basement was to keep her emails out of the public eye by willfully avoiding freedom of information laws. No president, no secretary of state, no public official at any level is above the law. She chose to ignore it, and must face the consequences." Pascal-Emmanuel Gobry wrote in The Week that "Clinton set up a personal email server, in defiance or at least circumvention of rules, with the probable motive of evading federal records and transparency requirements, and did it with subpar security."

In October 2016, security researcher Kevin Beaumont reported that the Trump Organization's email servers were running Windows Server 2003 and Internet Information Services 6.0, which had been unsupported by Microsoft since July 2015, and that they were not utilising two-factor authentication for security. Publications such as The Register noted the incident's similarity to the Clinton email controversy.

On November 2, 2016, Fox News anchor Bret Baier reported that according to Fox's anonymous sources the FBI had discovered that Clinton's private server had been hacked by "five foreign intelligence agencies." Baier further reported that according to an anonymous source an FBI investigation of the Clinton Foundation was "likely" to lead to an indictment of Hillary Clinton. On November 4, 2016, he acknowledged that his assertions were a mistake, saying, "indictment obviously is a very loaded word," and that he was sorry.

== House Select Committee on Benghazi ==
On March 27, 2015, Republican Congressman Trey Gowdy, Chairman of the Select Committee on Benghazi, asserted that some time after October 2014, Clinton "unilaterally decided to wipe her server clean" and "summarily decided to delete all emails." Clinton's attorney, David E. Kendall, said that day that an examination showed that no copies of any of Clinton's emails remained on the server. Kendall said the server was reconfigured to only retain emails for 60 days after Clinton lawyers had decided which emails needed to be turned over.

On June 22, 2015, the Benghazi panel released emails between Clinton and Sidney Blumenthal, who had been recently deposed by the committee. Committee chairman Gowdy issued a press release criticizing Clinton for not providing the emails to the State Department. Clinton had said she provided all work-related emails to the State Department, and that only emails of a personal nature on her private server were destroyed. The State Department confirmed that 10 emails and parts of five others from Sidney Blumenthal regarding Benghazi, which the committee had made public on June 22, could not be located in the Department's records, but that the 46 other, previously unreleased Libya-related Blumenthal emails published by the committee, were in the Department's records. In response, Clinton campaign spokesman Nick Merrill, when asked about the discrepancy said: "She has turned over 55,000 pages of materials to the State Department, including all emails in her possession from Mr. Blumenthal." Republican Committee members were encouraged about their probe, having found emails that Clinton failed to produce. Clinton campaign staff accused Gowdy and Republicans of "clinging to their invented scandal."

In response to comments that House Republican Majority Leader Kevin McCarthy made on September 29, 2015, about damaging Clinton's poll numbers, Minority Leader Nancy Pelosi threatened to end the Democrats' participation in the committee. Representative Louise Slaughter (D-NY) introduced an amendment to disband the committee, which was defeated in a party-line vote. On October 7, the editorial board of The New York Times called for the end of the committee. Representative Alan Grayson (D-FL) took step towards filing an ethics complaint, calling the committee "the new McCarthyism", alleging it was violating both House rules and federal law by using official funds for political purposes. Richard L. Hanna, (R-NY), and conservative pundit Bill O'Reilly acknowledged the partisan nature of the committee. On October 22, 2015, Clinton testified before the committee and answered members' questions for eleven hours in a public hearing. The New York Times reported that "the long day of often-testy exchanges between committee members and their prominent witness revealed little new information about an episode that has been the subject of seven previous investigations ... Perhaps stung by recent admissions that the pursuit of Mrs. Clinton's emails was politically motivated, Republican lawmakers on the panel for the most part avoided any mention of her use of a private email server." The email issue did arise shortly before lunch, in "a shouting match" between Republican committee chair Trey Gowdy and two Democrats, Adam Schiff and Elijah Cummings. Late in the hearing, Republican Representative Jim Jordan of Ohio accused Clinton of changing her accounts of the email service, leading to a "heated exchange" in which Clinton said that she had erred in making a private email account, but denied having dealt with anything marked classified, instead seeking "to be transparent by publicly releasing her emails."

== Freedom of Information lawsuits ==
=== Judicial Watch v. U.S. Department of State ===
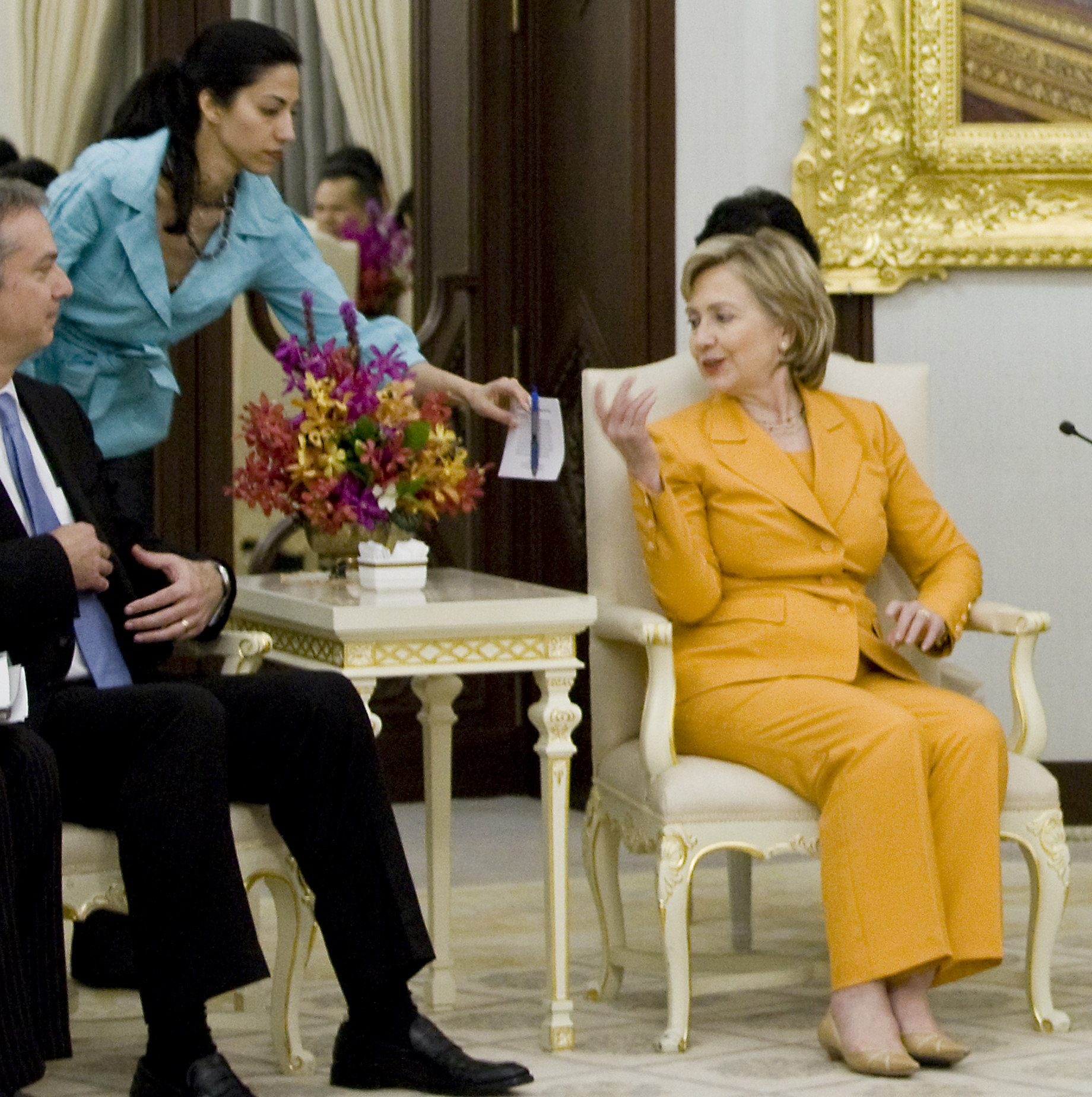
Huma Abedin passing a note to Hillary Clinton

Judicial Watch, a conservative activist group, filed a complaint against the Department of State in the U.S. District Court for the District of Columbia on September 10, 2013, seeking records under the federal Freedom of Information Act relating to Clinton aide Huma Abedin (a former deputy chief of staff and former senior advisor at the State Department). Judicial Watch was particularly interested in Abedin's role as a "special government employee" (SGE), a consulting position which allowed her to represent outside clients while also serving at the State Department. After corresponding with the State Department, Judicial Watch agreed to dismiss its lawsuit on March 14, 2014. On March 12, 2015, in response to the uncovering of Clinton's private email account, it filed a motion to reopen the suit, alleging that the State Department had misrepresented its search and had not properly preserved and maintained records under the act. U.S. District Judge Emmet G. Sullivan granted the motion to reopen the case on June 19, 2015.

On July 21, 2015, Judge Sullivan issued supplemental discovery orders, including one that Clinton, Abedin, and former Deputy Secretary of State Cheryl Mills disclose any required information they had not disclosed already, and promise under oath that they had done so, including a description of the extent Abedin and Mills had used Clinton's email server for official government business.

On August 10, 2015, Clinton filed her declaration, stating "I have directed that all my emails on clintonemail.com in my custody that were or potentially were federal records be provided to the Department of State," and that as a result of this directive, 55,000 pages of emails were produced to the Department on December 5, 2014. She said in her statement that Abedin did have an email account through clintonemail.com that "was used at times for government business," but that Mills did not. The statement was filed as Clinton faced questions over fifteen emails in exchanges with Blumenthal that were not among the emails she gave to the department the previous year. She did not address the matter of those emails in the statement. On September 25, 2015, several additional emails from her private server surfaced which she had not provided to the State Department. These emails between Clinton and General David Petraeus, discussing personnel matters, were part of an email chain that started on a different email account before her tenure as Secretary of State, but continued onto her private server in late January 2009 after she had taken office. The existence of these emails also called into question Clinton's previous statement that she did not use the server before March 18, 2009.

In February 2016, Judge Sullivan issued a discovery order in the case, ruling that depositions of State Department officials and top Clinton aides were to proceed. On May 26, 2016, Judicial Watch released the transcript of the deposition of Lewis Lukens; on May 31, 2016, the transcript of Cheryl Mills; on June 7, 2016, the transcript of Ambassador Stephen Mull; and on June 9, 2016, Karin Lang, Director of Executive Secretariat Staff.

In March 2020, federal district court judge Royce Lamberth ruled that Clinton must provide a deposition. A three-judge panel of the DC Circuit Court of Appeals unanimously overturned Lamberth's ruling the following August. The full DC Circuit Court unanimously declined to hear an appeal in October, allowing the panel decision to stand.

The testimony of Clarence Finney, who worked in the department responsible for FOIA searches, said that he first became curious about Clinton's email setup after seeing the Texts from Hillary meme on the Internet.

=== Jason Leopold v. U.S. Department of State ===
In November 2014, Jason Leopold of Vice News made a Freedom of Information Act request for Clinton's State Department records, and, on January 25, 2015, filed a lawsuit in the U.S. District Court for the District of Columbia seeking to compel production of responsive documents. After some dispute between Leopold and the State Department over the request, U.S. District Judge Rudolph Contreras ordered rolling production and release of the emails on a schedule set by the State Department.

Over the next several months, the State Department completed production of 30,068 emails, which were released in 14 batches, with the final batch released on February 29, 2016. Both the Wall Street Journal and WikiLeaks independently set up search engines for anyone who would like to search through the Clinton emails released by the State Department.

It was revealed in October 2017 that during the 2016 US presidential election, Cambridge Analytica funder and GOP mega-donor Rebekah Mercer had proposed creating a searchable data base for Hillary Clinton emails in the public domain and then forwarded this suggestion to several people, including Cambridge Analytica CEO Alexander Nix, who personally emailed a request to Julian Assange for Clinton's emails. Assange responded to the report by saying he denied Nix's request.

The emails showed that Blumenthal communicated with Clinton while Secretary on a variety of issues including Benghazi.

=== Associated Press v. U.S. Department of State ===
On March 11, 2015, the day after Clinton acknowledged her private email account, the Associated Press (AP) filed suit against the State Department regarding multiple FOIA requests over the past five years. The requests were for various emails and other documents from Clinton's time as secretary of state and were still unfulfilled at the time. The State Department said that a high volume of FOIA requests and a large backlog had caused the delay.

On July 20, 2015, U.S. District Judge Richard J. Leon reacted angrily to what he said was "the State Department for four years dragging their feet." Leon said that "even the least ambitious bureaucrat" could process the request faster than the State Department was doing.

On August 7, 2015, Leon issued an order setting a stringent schedule for the State Department to provide the AP with the requested documents over the next eight months. The order issued by Leon did not include the 55,000 pages of Clinton emails the State Department scheduled to be released in the Leopold case, or take into account 20 boxes given to the State Department by Philippe Reines, a former Clinton senior adviser.

=== Other suits and coordination of email cases ===
In September 2015, the State Department filed a motion in court seeking to consolidate and coordinate the large number of Freedom of Information Act lawsuits relating to Clinton and Clinton-related emails. There were at the time at least three dozen lawsuits pending, before 17 different judges.

In a U.S. District Court for the District of Columbia order issued on October 8, 2015, Chief U.S. District Judge Richard W. Roberts wrote that the cases did not meet the usual criteria for consolidation but: "The judges who have been randomly assigned to these cases have been and continue to be committed to informal coordination so as to avoid unnecessary inefficiencies and confusion, and the parties are also urged to meet and confer to assist in coordination."

In 2015, Judicial Watch and the Cause of Action Institute filed two lawsuits seeking a court order to compel the Department of State and the National Archives and Records Administration to recover emails from Clinton's server. In January 2016, these two suits (which were consolidated because they involved the same issues) were dismissed as moot by U.S. District Judge James Boasberg, because the government was already working to recover and preserve these emails.

In March 2016, the Republican National Committee filed four new complaints in the U.S. District Court for the District of Columbia stemming from Freedom of Information Act requests it had filed the previous year. These new filings brought the total number of civil suits over access to Clinton's records pending in federal court to at least 38.

In June 2016, in response to the Republican National Committee's complaints filed in March 2016, the State Department estimates it will take 75 years to complete the review of documents which are responsive to the complaints. It has been observed that a delay of this nature would cause the documents to remain out of public view longer than the vast majority of classified documents which must be declassified after 25 years.

In December 2018, judge Royce Lamberth of the U.S. District Court for the District of Columbia called Clinton's use of a private server for government business "one of the gravest modern offenses to government transparency".

== See also ==
- 2016 Democratic National Committee email leak
- 2025 United States government group chat leak
- Clinton Foundation–State Department controversy
- Clinton plan intelligence conspiracy theory
- FBI investigation into Donald Trump's handling of presidential documents
- White House FBI files controversy
