= J. William Leonard =

American administrator

J. William Leonard is an American administrator who was appointed Director of the Information Security Oversight Office (ISOO) on Monday, June 3, 2002.
