= Texts from Hillary =

Internet meme

Texts from Hillary was an internet meme that went viral in 2012, based on photographs of then-Secretary of State Hillary Clinton. The photos show Clinton holding a BlackBerry phone, wearing sunglasses. A Tumblr blog added various captions under the photo, imagining what Clinton might have been texting, and paired them with a matching photo to represent her imagined conversation partner.

== Meme ==
The meme was based on two photographs of the same moment, from slightly different angles. One version of the photo was taken by Diane Walker from Time magazine, the other by Kevin Lamarque from the Associated Press. The photo was taken while Clinton was aboard a diplomatic trip to Libya.

== Email controversy ==
In June 2016, a Freedom of Information Act deposition in a lawsuit by Judicial Watch, which was part of the Hillary Clinton email controversy, revealed that the photo caught the interest of State Department employees, who were inspired to investigate if Clinton was using a personal email account instead of an official state account.

Clinton used the photo as her Twitter avatar until a week after the controversy first broke.
