= List of American network TV Sunday morning talk shows =

This is a listing of American television network programs currently airing or have aired during Sunday morning or various.

Sunday morning talk programming begins at 8:00am Eastern Time Zone/Pacific Time Zone, after network affiliates' late local news, plus cable television.

== Current ==
All times Eastern Time Zone/Pacific Time Zone—see effects of time on North American broadcasting for explanation.

Broadcast
| Network | Program title | Duration | Days | Time (ET) | Current anchor(s) | Debut |
|---|---|---|---|---|---|---|
| ABC | This Week | 1 hour (with commercials) | Sundays | 9:00am | George Stephanopoulos (with Martha Raddatz and Jonathan Karl) | November 15, 1981 |
| CBS | Face the Nation | 1 hour (with commercials) | Sundays | 10:30am | Margaret Brennan | November 7, 1954 |
| Fox | Fox News Sunday | 1 hour (with commercials) | Sundays | 9:00am | Shannon Bream | April 28, 1996 |
| NBC | Meet the Press | 1 hour (with commercials) | Sundays | 9:00am | Kristen Welker | November 6, 1947 |
| PBS | Washington Week | 30 minutes | Fridays | 8:00pm | Editor-in-chief of The Atlantic, Jeffrey Goldberg | February 24, 1967 |
| PBS | To the Contrary with Bonnie Erbé | 30 minutes | Saturdays | N/A | Bonnie Erbé | April 3, 1992 |
| Syndication | Full Measure with Sharyl Attkisson | 30 minutes (with commercials) | Sundays | 9:30am | Sharyl Attkisson | October 4, 2015 |
| Syndication | Matter of Fact with Soledad O'Brien | 30 minutes (with commercials) | Sundays | Various | Soledad O'Brien | November 8, 2015 |
| Telemundo | Enfoque con José Díaz-Balart (Spanish for Focus with José Díaz-Balart) | 1 hour (with commercials) | Sundays | Various | José Díaz-Balart | 2010 |
| Univision | Al Punto (Spanish for To the Point) | 1 hour (with commercials) | Sundays | Various | Jorge Ramos | September 9, 2007 |
Cable
| CNN | State of the Union | 1 hour (with commercials) | Sundays | 9:00am ET/6:00am PT | Jake Tapper and Dana Bash | January 18, 2009 |
| CNN | Fareed Zakaria GPS | 1 hour (with commercials) | Sundays | 10:00am ET/7:00am PT | Fareed Zakaria | June 1, 2008 |
| CNN | Inside Politics | 1 hour (with commercials) | Sundays | 11:00am ET/8:00am PT | Abby Phillip | 1984 (original); February 2, 2014 (revival) |
| Fox News | Media Buzz | 1 hour (with commercials) | Sundays | 11:00am ET/8:00am PT | Howard Kurtz | September 7, 2013 |
| Fox News | Fox News Sunday (rebroadcast) | 1 hour (with commercials) | Sundays | 2:00pm ET/11:00am PT | Shannon Bream | October 13, 1996 |
| MSNBC | PoliticsNation with Al Sharpton | 1 hour (with commercials) | Sundays | 8:00am ET/5:00am PT | Al Sharpton | October 4, 2015 |
| MSNBC | Inside with Jen Psaki | 1 hour (with commercials) | Sundays | 12:00pm ET | Jen Psaki | March 19, 2023 |

== Former ==
=== Broadcast networks ===
==== ABC ====
- Issues and Answers (November 27, 1960 – November 8, 1981, succeeded by This Week)

==== PBS ====
- Inside Washington (1988 – 2013; distributed by American Public Television)
- The McLaughlin Group (January 1, 1982 – August 19, 2016) (syndication)

==== Syndication ====
- The Chris Matthews Show (September 22, 2002 – July 21, 2013)

=== Local Television ===
- This Week in Northern California (the former name of KQED Newsroom) (KQED 9/San Francisco; February 16, 1990 – September 13, 2013)

=== Cable/satellite ===
==== CNN ====
- Late Edition with Wolf Blitzer (October 3, 1993 – January 11, 2009)
- Reliable Sources (1993 – August 21, 2022)

==== Fox News ====
- Fox News Watch (1997 – August 31, 2013)
