= Candy Crowley =

American news anchor

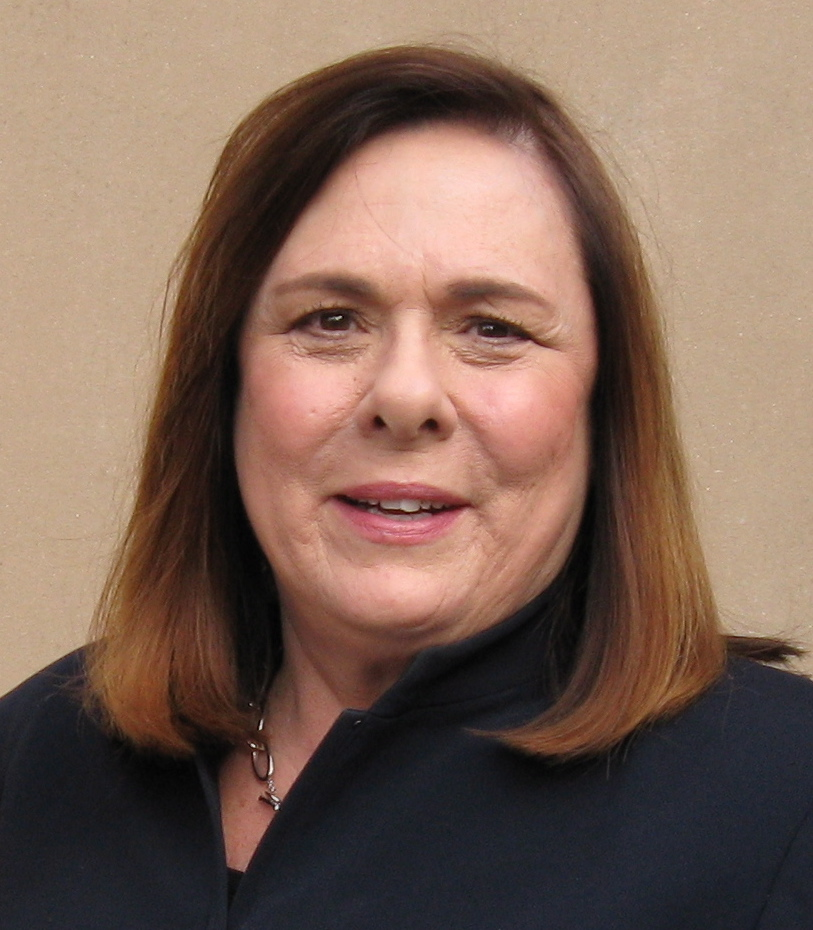
- Crowley in February 2008, at the Toyota Center in Houston, Texas
- Born: Candy Alt Crowley; December 26, 1948 (age 77); Kalamazoo, Michigan, U.S.
- Education: The Principia School; Randolph-Macon Woman's College
- Occupations: Broadcast journalist, anchor
- Notable credit(s): Inside Politics; Anchor of State of the Union with Candy Crowley
- Title: Chief political correspondent
- Children: 2

Candy Alt Crowley (born December 26, 1948) is an American news anchor who was employed as CNN's chief political correspondent, specializing in American national and state elections. She was based in CNN's Washington, D.C. bureau and was the anchor of its Sunday morning talk show State of the Union with Candy Crowley. She has covered elections for over two decades.

== Early life and education ==
Crowley was born in Kalamazoo, Michigan, where her family had moved briefly from St. Louis, Missouri. Her family moved back to St. Louis when she was a toddler and she grew up in the St. Louis County suburb of Creve Coeur, Missouri. She attended kindergarten through high school at The Principia School, a private school for children of Christian Scientists in St. Louis County, where she graduated in 1966. After high school she attended Randolph-Macon Woman's College in Lynchburg, Virginia, where she graduated with a Bachelor of Arts degree in English.

== Career ==
Crowley started her career as a newsroom assistant with the Washington, D.C.–based radio station WASH-FM. She was an anchor for Mutual Broadcasting and the White House correspondent for the Associated Press. She moved from NBC to CNN in 1987. She hosted Inside Politics in place of Judy Woodruff before the show was replaced with The Situation Room. In February 2010, Crowley succeeded John King as an anchor of the Sunday morning political talk show State of the Union.

Crowley has been characterized by the Los Angeles Times as a "straight shooter", her career as "sophisticated political observation, graceful writing, and determined fairness," and her style as "no-nonsense". The L.A. Times article says that because of this criticism of her reporting is equally distributed between the Democratic and Republican parties.

Crowley has won several awards, including the Broadcasters' Award from the Associated Press, the 2003 and 1998 Dirksen Awards from the National Press Foundation, the 1997 and 2005 Joan Shorenstein Barone Award, a 2003 Emmy Award for her work on CNN Presents Enemy Within, the 2004 Gracie Allen Award for her war coverage, a National Headliner and a Cine award, the 2005 Edward R. Murrow Award, and the 2012 William Allen White Foundation National Citation from the school of journalism at the University of Kansas for her expertise on "politics, politicians, and the events that have changed the world."

Crowley served as the moderator October 16, 2012, for the second presidential election debate between President Barack Obama and his Republican opponent Mitt Romney. She received criticism for her contradicting Romney and seemingly confirming Obama's statement during an exchange with Romney over the language the President used regarding the attack on the U.S. diplomatic mission in Benghazi. CNN noted that "conservative critics have launched an attack Crowley"...but "Crowley was right." Crowley later stated that Romney "was right in the main, I just think that he picked the wrong word."

On March 17, 2013, following their CNN report on the guilty verdict of two Steubenville high school football players for the rape of an unconscious sixteen-year-old, Crowley and fellow journalist Poppy Harlow were criticized for giving too much coverage to how the verdict would affect the defendants' lives.

CNN announced on December 5, 2014, Crowley's decision to leave the network after 27 years. CNN Worldwide President Jeff Zucker said Crowley "has made the decision to move on, so she can embark on the next chapter of her already prolific career. As difficult as it is for us to imagine CNN without Candy, we know that she comes to this decision thoughtfully, and she has our full support." Her last broadcast was on State of the Union on December 21, 2014. On August 17, 2015, Politico reported that CNN correspondent Dana Bash would replace Crowley as chief political correspondent.

In fall 2015, Crowley became a fellow at the Harvard Institute of Politics.

== Personal life ==
Crowley is a vegetarian and practices Transcendental Meditation. She is divorced, and has two children, two stepchildren and four grandchildren. Her elder child is a neurosurgeon and her younger son a musician.
