= Passer rating =

Measure of the performance of passers in gridiron football

Passer rating (also known as passing efficiency in college football) is a measure of the performance of passers, primarily quarterbacks, in gridiron football. There are two formulas currently in use: one used by both the National Football League (NFL) and Canadian Football League (CFL), and the other used in NCAA football. Passer rating is calculated using a player's passing attempts, completions, yards, touchdowns, and interceptions. Passer rating in the NFL is on a scale from 0 to 158.3. Passing efficiency in college football is on a scale from −731.6 to 1261.6.

Since 1973, passer rating has been the official formula used by the NFL to determine its passing leader.

Passer rating is sometimes colloquially referred to as quarterback rating or QB rating; however, the statistic applies only to passing (not to other contributions by a quarterback) and applies to any player at any position who throws a forward pass, not just to quarterbacks. Other measurements, such as ESPN's total quarterback rating and Pro Football Focus grades, have been produced to take account of non-passing contributions or mistakes made by passers.

== History ==
Before the development of the passer rating, the NFL struggled with how to crown a passing leader.

From 1932 to 1937, it was the quarterback with the most passing yardage, and from 1938 to 1940, it was the quarterback with the highest completion percentage. In 1941, a system was created that ranked the league's quarterbacks relative to their peers' performance. Over the next thirty years, the criteria used to crown a passing leader changed several times; however, the ranking system made it impossible to determine a quarterback's rank until all quarterbacks had completed their games that week, or to compare quarterback performances across multiple seasons.

With this in mind, in 1971, NFL commissioner Pete Rozelle asked the league's statistical committee to develop a better system: this committee was headed by Don Smith of the Pro Football Hall of Fame, Seymour Siwoff of the Elias Sports Bureau, and NFL executive Don Weiss. Smith and Siwoff established passing performance standards based on data from all qualified pro football passers between 1960 and 1970, and used those data to create the passer rating, with the formula being adopted by the NFL in 1973.

== NFL and CFL formula ==
The NFL passer rating formula includes five variables: pass attempts, completions, passing yards, touchdown passes, and interceptions. Each of those variables is scaled to a value between 0 and 2.375, with 1.0 being statistically average (based on league data between 1960 and 1970). When the formula was created, a 66.7 rating indicated an average performance, and a 100+ rating indicated an excellent performance. However, passing performance has improved steadily since then and in 2017 the league average rating was 88.6, and by 2020 it was 93.6.

The four separate calculations can be expressed in the following equations:

$a = \left ({\text{CMP} \over \text{ATT}} - 0.3 \right ) \times 5$

$b = \left ({\text{YDS} \over \text{ATT}} - 3 \right ) \times 0.25$

$c = \left ({\text{TD} \over \text{ATT}} \right ) \times 20$

$d = 2.375 - \left ({\text{INT} \over \text{ATT}} \times 25 \right )$

where

ATT = Number of passing attempts
CMP = Number of completions
YDS = Passing yards
TD = Touchdown passes
INT = Interceptions

If the result of any calculation is greater than 2.375, it is set to 2.375. If the result is a negative number, it is set to zero.

Then, the above calculations are used to complete the passer rating:

$\text{Passer Rating} = \left ({a + b + c + d \over 6} \right ) \times 100$

A perfect passer rating (158.3) requires at least:	A minimum rating (0.0) requires at best:
77.5% completion percentage (31 completions in 40 attempts); 12.5 yards per attempt 11.875% TD/ATT (1 TD/8.421ATT); No interceptions	30.0% completion percentage 3.0 yards per attempt No touchdowns 9.5% INT/ATT (1INT/10.526ATT)

== NCAA formula ==
The NCAA passing efficiency formula is similar to that of the NFL passer rating, but does not impose limits on the four components. The formula is based on college football data between 1965 and 1978, and when the formula was first created, a 100 passer efficiency indicated an average performance.

The passing efficiency formula is:

$\text{Passer Efficiency}_{\text{NCAA}} = {(8.4 \times \text{YDS}) + (330 \times \text{TDP}) + (100 \times \text{CMP}) - (200 \times \text{INT}) \over \text{ATT}}$

where

ATT = Number of passing attempts
CMP = Number of completions
YDS = Passing yards
TDP = Touchdown passes
INT = Interceptions

The NCAA passer efficiency has an upper limit of 1,261.6 (every attempt is a 99-yard completion for a touchdown), and a lower limit of −731.6 (every attempt is completed, but results in a 99-yard loss). A passer who throws only interceptions will have a −200 efficiency, as would a passer who only throws completed passes losing an average of 35.714 yards.

== Advantages ==
In 2011, Sports Illustrated published an article by Kerry Byrne of Cold Hard Football Facts highlighting the importance of passer rating in determining a team's success. "Put most simply," the article states, "you cannot be a smart football analyst and dismiss passer rating. In fact, it's impossible to look at the incredible correlation of victory to passer rating and then dismiss it. You might as well dismiss the score of a game when determining a winner. [...] Few, if any, are more indicative of wins and losses than passer rating. Teams that posted a higher passer rating went 203–53 (.793) in 2010 and an incredible 151–29 (.839) after Week 5." Byrne made an expanded defense of the passer rating and its importance for the Pro Football Researchers Association in 2012. The study showed that all of the eight teams since 1940 that led the league in both offensive passer rating and defensive passer rating won championships.

== Flaws ==
The passer rating equation does not take into account sacks, fumbles, or a quarterback's rushing production, although by definition it only measures passing statistics.

Due to rule changes and improvement in quarterback play, the league-wide passer rating has increased by an average of 0.63 points per season since its introduction in 1973, from 61.7 that year to 93.6 in 2020, which makes passer rating a poor statistic for comparing quarterbacks from different seasons or eras.

== Other measurements ==
=== Total quarterback rating ===
ESPN's total quarterback rating is a proprietary statistic that was introduced in 2011 and is designed to measure the total effectiveness and performance of a quarterback. The metric takes into account all of a quarterback's contribution to a game, including passing, rushing, sacks, penalties, touchdowns, and turnovers. Moreover, each play is weighted based on its "difficulty", the context of the game, and the strength of the opposing defense. This means that statistics in garbage time of a blowout game hold less merit than statistics in a close game. Also, a quarterback who throws for four touchdowns and 300 yards against a strong defense will have a higher QBR than a quarterback who has the same stat line against the worst defense in the NFL.

QBR functions on a 0–100 scale, where an average NFL quarterback typically has around a 50 QBR, while a Pro Bowl caliber quarterback will have approximately a 75. This scale also represents a percentile of overall quarterback performances since 2006. This means that if a quarterback has a QBR of 90 their performance in that game is, on average, better than 90% of other quarterback performances.

It is also very common for there to be significant differences between QBR and passer rating leaders due to the additional variables and situational play context that contribute to the calculation of QBR. For example, in 2019, Lamar Jackson had a league leading QBR of 83.0 and earned MVP honors. However, in terms of passer rating, Jackson (113.3) finished behind Ryan Tannehill (117.5) and Drew Brees (116.3), who finished ninth and third in QBR, respectively.

=== PFF Player Grades ===
Pro Football Focus (PFF) is a football website that conducts in-depth analysis on NFL and NCAA games and players. Part of this analysis involves assigning each player in the NFL, as well as the Power Four at the collegiate level, a grade that indicates their performance.

According to PFF, the group's algorithm analyzes every play for each individual player and measures the impact that said player has while on the field. A player's impact is then given a grade between −2 and +2 in 0.5 increments. Each position has a scale with a unique algorithm and rules. The scale also takes into account game context, so a strong play in the fourth quarter of a close matchup will be graded higher than one in the 2nd quarter of a blowout game.

A 0 player grade on any given play represents any position player performing at an expected level and in a manner that neither positively nor negatively impacts their team. An example of this is a running back taking a carry through the correct hole and picking up three to four yards in a 1st and ten situation. Meanwhile, a +2 represents an incredible performance on a play that shifts the dynamic of a game in favor of the player's team. On the other hand, a −2 is a play that catastrophically hinders a team's chance of winning, such as a quarterback throwing a pick-six in the fourth quarter of a close game. Ambiguous plays where the outcome is unclear on how a player impacted their team are typically given a 0.

The sum of these plus-minuses are then converted on a 0–100 scale and produce a grade for a single game. However, a player's season grade is not the average of the 17 grades a player receives each game. Instead, PFF credits a player's entire body of work and longevity throughout the season. It is, therefore, possible for a player to have a higher season grade than any individual grade that a player received in any game he played in.

== Records ==
=== NFL ===
- Highest passer rating, career (minimum 1,500 attempts): 104.8, Brock Purdy
- Highest passer rating, season (minimum 200 attempts): 122.5, Aaron Rodgers, 2011
- Highest passer rating, postseason (minimum 150 attempts): 105.9, Baker Mayfield

Wide receiver Antwaan Randle El, with a passer rating of 157.5 from 21 completed passes of a possible 26, has the highest career rating of any non-QB with more than twenty attempts. As of 2025, 82 NFL quarterbacks have completed a game with a perfect passer rating of 158.3, and seven have done so multiple times. Lamar Jackson, and Peyton Manning are tied for the record for the most games with a perfect passer rating, with four each. Phil Simms holds the record for the highest passer rating in a Super Bowl, at 150.92 in Super Bowl XXI. Josh Allen holds the record for highest passer rating in a single postseason, at 149.0 in the 2021 playoffs.

=== NCAA (Division I FBS) ===
- Highest passing efficiency, career (minimum 325 completions): 199.4, Tua Tagovailoa, Alabama, 2017–2019
- Highest passing efficiency, season (minimum 15 attempts per game): 208.0 – Jayden Daniels, LSU Tigers, 2023

== See also ==
- List of NFL quarterbacks who have posted a perfect passer rating
- List of NFL quarterbacks who have posted a passer rating of zero
- NFL career passer rating leaders
- List of National Football League season passer rating leaders
