= Lela Swift =

American television director (1919–2015)

- Born: Lillian Siwoff; February 1, 1919; New York City, New York, U.S.
- Died: August 4, 2015 (aged 96); Santa Monica, California, U.S.
- Occupations: director; producer
- Spouse: Gilbert Schwartz
- Children: 2
- Family: Seymour Siwoff (brother)

Lela Swift (born Lillian Siwoff; February 1, 1919 – August 4, 2015) was a television director and producer, best known for her work on Dark Shadows, which she also produced from 1970–71, and Ryan's Hope.

== Early life ==
She was born in 1919 as Lillian Siwoff in New York City, New York. Her brother was baseball statistician and owner of the Elias Sports Bureau, Seymour Siwoff.

== Career ==
Swift started her career in the secretarial pool at CBS. She worked behind the scenes on news programs there. She worked through the studio system ranks at CBS and served as an assistant director on several anthology series. Her directorial career began in 1950.

In 1961, she moved to NBC and worked on the Special for Women series. In 1963, she directed a show, hosted by Dr. Herbert L. Shore, featuring a commentary on the contemporary drama in Africa, illustrated by several scenes from the satiric comedy "The Trials of Brother Jero" by Wole Soyinka produced for National Educational Television and the New York State Education Department by Channel 13 (WNDT) and other episodes in the "Culture and Continents" series. In 1966, she joined Dan Curtis to work on ABC's Dark Shadows television series. It lasted five seasons with 1,225 episodes. Swift directed almost half of the episodes during its run.

She later served as one of the directors for the series Ryan's Hope, a daytime drama about a large working-class Irish-American family that lasted 14 years.

== Awards ==
Swift received four Daytime Emmy nominations for her work on Ryan's Hope, winning in 1977, 1979, and 1980. She also received a Daytime Emmy nomination in the Best Individual Director for a Special Program category for an episode of The ABC Afternoon Playbreak.

== Death and legacy ==
She died at her Santa Monica, California home on August 4, 2015. She was buried at Hillside Memorial Park Cemetery.

== Personal life ==
Her husband, Gilbert ("Geb") Schwartz, died on January 30, 2015, after suffering from Alzheimer's disease for many years. The couple had two sons, Russell and Stuart, who both work in the television industry; Russell is an executive at Starz, and Stuart is a TV producer known for his work on Unsolved Mysteries (not to be confused with Stuart Schwartz who produced news programs for ABC News including Good Morning America).
