= Reliable Sources =

Sunday morning talk show on CNN, 1992–2022

- Genre: News Media
- Starring: Bernard Kalb (1992–1998); Howard Kurtz (1998–2013); Brian Stelter (2013–2022)
- Opening theme: "Race To The Stars" by Louise Bernadette Dowd and Michael Holborn (2014–2022)
- Country of origin: United States
- Original language: English

Production
- Production locations: 30 Hudson Yards; New York City
- Camera setup: Multi-camera

Original release
- Network: CNN
- Release: March 7, 1992 – August 21, 2022

Related
- Inside Politics; State of the Union; Fareed Zakaria GPS

Reliable Sources is an American Sunday morning talk show that aired on CNN from 1992 to 2022. It focused on analysis of and commentary on the American news media. It aired from 11:00 AM to 12:00 PM ET, from CNN's WarnerMedia studios in New York City. It was also broadcast worldwide by CNN International.

The show was initially created to analyze the media's coverage of the Persian Gulf War, but went on to focus on the media's coverage of the Valerie Plame affair, the Iraq War, the outing of Mark Felt as Deep Throat, and many other events and internal media stories.

On August 18, 2022, CNN canceled the program, and host Brian Stelter announced his departure from the network. The final episode aired on August 21, 2022.

== History ==
The program debuted on March 7, 1992. Until 2009, it was broadcast as a stand-alone program, but on January 18, 2009, Reliable Sources became a segment during CNN's new Sunday morning political program State of the Union with John King, although it remained hosted by Howard Kurtz and retained its timeslot. In January 2010, after John King left the show, Reliable Sources again became its own show, moving back one hour in the process.

Reliable Sources reviews the coverage of the news stories of the past week by the media, in addition to news about the news media behind the scenes, all with a constantly changing group of online, print, and broadcast journalists. The segments also feature some one-on-one interviews with journalists taking part in a news event or covering a story, such as Bob Woodruff after his return to ABC News in February 2007 after his severe injuries in Iraq on January 29, 2006.

Bernard Kalb was the first host from 1992 to 1998.

Howard Kurtz hosted the program for fifteen years starting in 1998 before leaving CNN to join Fox News on July 1, 2013, where he became the host of Media Buzz, which aired opposite Reliable Sources on Sunday mornings and served as its direct competition from 2013 until Reliable Sources was cancelled in 2022. After Kurtz's departure, Reliable Sources used a rotating roster of guest hosts until December 8, 2013, when former New York Times reporter Brian Stelter became the program's permanent host.

From its debut until 2014, Reliable Sources was based at CNN's bureau in Washington, D.C. The program moved to the network's studios at Time Warner Center in New York City on September 21, 2014, where it remained until its cancellation in August 2022.
