= Jake Tapper =

American journalist (born 1969)

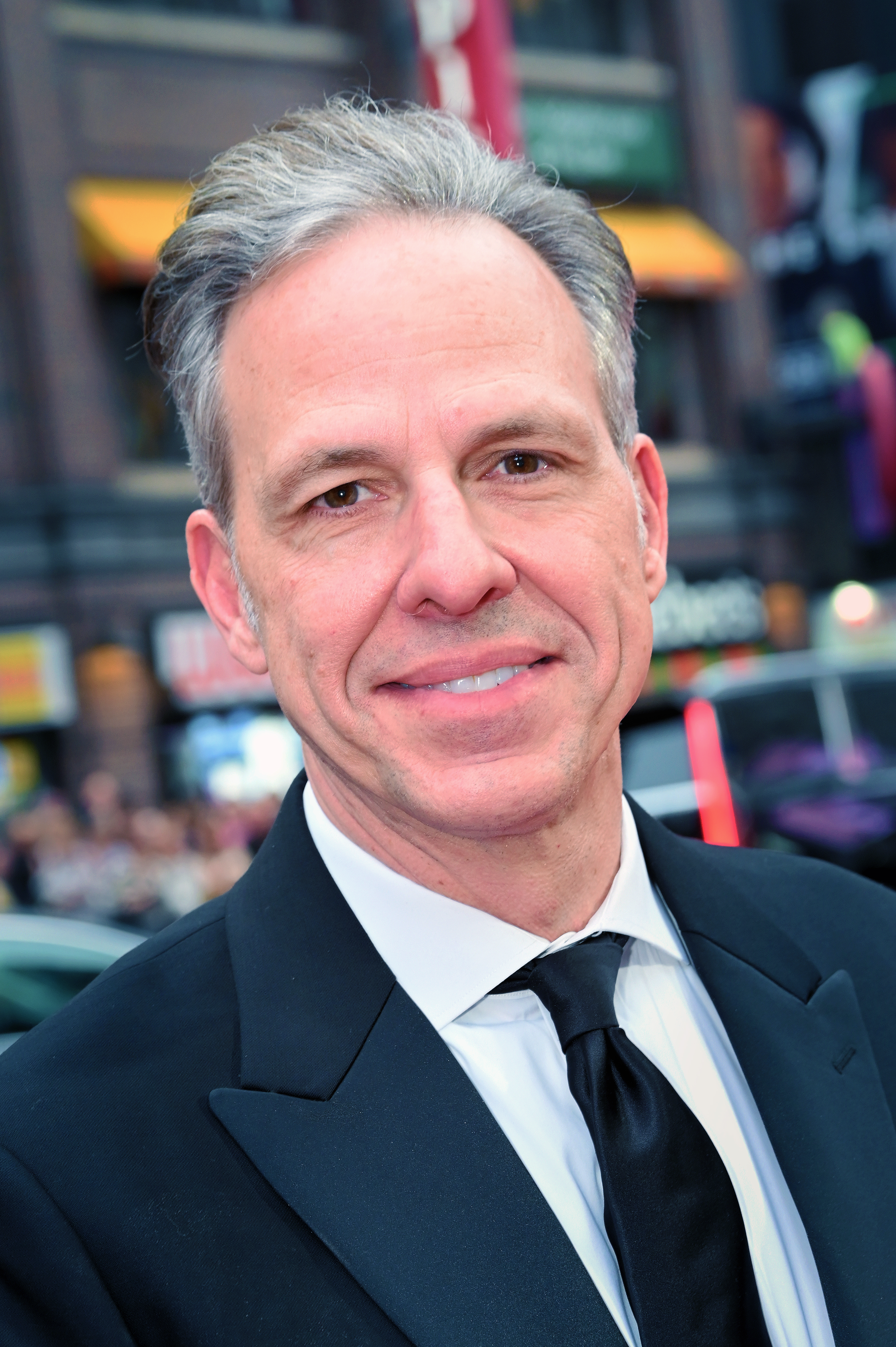
- Tapper in 2025
- Born: Jacob Paul Tapper; March 12, 1969 (age 57); New York City, U.S.
- Education: Dartmouth College (BA)
- Occupation: Journalist
- Employer: CNN
- Organization: White House Correspondents' Association
- Spouse: Jennifer Marie Brown (m. 2006)
- Children: 2
- Awards: Merriman Smith Memorial Award; Emmy Award
- Website: jaketapper.com

Jacob Paul Tapper (born March 12, 1969) is an American journalist. He is the lead Washington anchor for CNN, hosts the weekday television news show The Lead with Jake Tapper, and co-hosts the Sunday morning public affairs program State of the Union.

At CNN, Tapper has won numerous journalism awards, including Emmy Awards in 2023 and in 2024. TheWrap described him as "perhaps the network's most respected anchor". In September 2015, the Republican primary debate moderated by Tapper, and including Donald Trump, drew more than 23 million viewers, making it the most-watched program in the history of CNN and the second-most watched primary debate ever. He also moderated the Republican presidential debate in Miami on March 10, 2016, which drew almost 12 million viewers, and according to Variety, "garnered acclaim for its substance". On June 27, 2024, Tapper co-moderated a debate between Joe Biden and Donald Trump watched by more than 51 million viewers and influenced Biden's subsequent decision to end his 2024 presidential campaign.

Before joining CNN, Tapper worked for ABC News as senior White House correspondent, where he received three Merriman Smith Memorial Awards from the White House Correspondents' Association. Tapper contributed to the coverage of the inauguration of President Obama that earned an Emmy Award for Outstanding Live Coverage of a Current News Story. He was also part of a team that was awarded an Edward R. Murrow Award for Video: Breaking News for "Target bin Laden: The Death of Public Enemy #1".

Tapper is the author of several books, including The Outpost: An Untold Story of American Valor, which debuted at number 10 in November 2012 on The New York Times Best Seller list for hardback non-fiction. Tapper's book and his reporting on veterans and troops were cited when the Congressional Medal of Honor Society awarded him the "Tex" McCrary Award for Excellence in Journalism.

== Early life and education ==
Tapper was born in New York City but raised in Queen Village, Philadelphia, the son of Theodore Samuel "Ted" and Helen Anne (née Palmatier) Tapper. His mother, originally from Canada, worked as a psychiatric nurse at the Philadelphia Veterans Affairs Medical Center. His father, from Chicago, graduated from Dartmouth College and Harvard Medical School and went on to serve as the president of South Philadelphia Pediatrics and associate clinical professor of pediatrics at Jefferson Medical College. His parents are Jewish; his mother, who was raised Presbyterian, converted to Judaism. He was named for Jacob Scher. When Tapper was young, he spent summers at Camp Ramah in the Poconos, a Jewish summer camp.

Tapper attended The Philadelphia School, an independent school focused on progressive education. As an eighth grader, he published a weekly comic strip in a local paper. Tapper later studied at Akiba Hebrew Academy, a Jewish day school in Merion, Pennsylvania. He graduated from Dartmouth College in 1991 with a B.A. in History modified by Visual Studies, earning Phi Beta Kappa and magna cum laude honors. At Dartmouth, Tapper was a member of Alpha Chi Alpha fraternity. He briefly attended the USC School of Cinematic Arts.

== Career ==
In 1992, Tapper served as a campaign press secretary for Democratic congressional candidate Marjorie Margolies-Mezvinsky (PA-13) and later served as her congressional press secretary. Tapper also worked for Powell Tate, a Washington, D.C. public relations firm run by Democrat Jody Powell and Republican Sheila Tate. Tapper served as a spokesman for Hooters and worked for Handgun Control, Inc. (now the Brady Center to Prevent Gun Violence) in 1997.

In 1998, after working for some time as a freelance writer, he was hired as a reporter by the Washington City Paper. During his two years with the paper, he wrote an article about his date with Monica Lewinsky, which skewered Washington's culture of scandal. Tapper won a Society of Professional Journalists award for his work at the Washington City Paper.

Tapper was the Washington correspondent for Salon from 1999 to 2002. Tapper's reports about Enron were nominated for a 2002 Columbia University School of Journalism online award, and he was an early questioner of the Bush administration's claims about Iraq having weapons of mass destruction.

In 2001, Tapper was the host of the CNN news talk show Take Five. He was also a columnist for TALK Magazine, and has written for The New Yorker, The New York Times Magazine, The Washington Post, the Los Angeles Times, The Weekly Standard, and other publications. Tapper was a frequent contributor to National Public Radio's All Things Considered and his work was included in The Best American Political Writing 2002. Tapper was the correspondent for a series of VH1 news specials in 2002.

=== ABC News ===
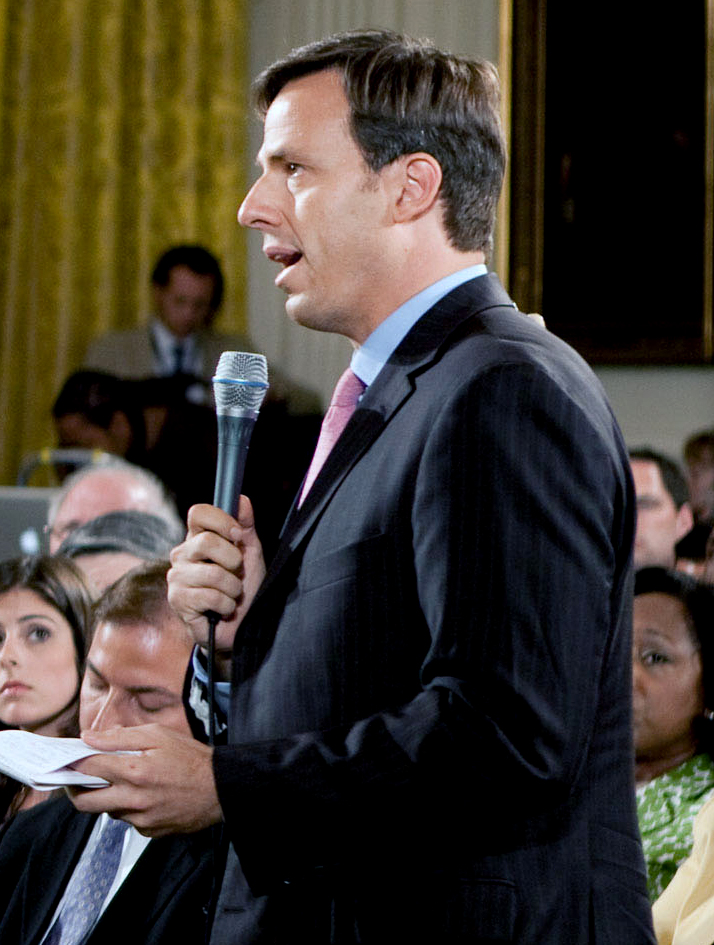
Tapper at the White House in 2009

ABC News hired Tapper in 2003. While working there, Tapper covered a range of topics including work in the ABC News Baghdad bureau, from New Orleans after the failure of the levees after Hurricane Katrina, and from Afghanistan. From March to July 2010, Tapper was interim anchor of ABC's This Week, hosting the program until Christiane Amanpour became This Week's anchor.

Tapper was named Senior White House Correspondent on November 5, 2008, the day after the 2008 presidential election. In 2010, 2011, and 2012, the White House Correspondents' Association awarded him the Merriman Smith Memorial Award for presidential coverage under deadline pressure. He was a key part of the ABC News coverage of the inauguration of President Obama that was awarded an Emmy Award for Outstanding Live Coverage of a Current News Story.

Tapper was a candidate to replace George Stephanopoulos as anchor of This Week , but CNN's Christiane Amanpour was selected instead. Tapper served as the interim anchor until Amanpour took over on August 1, 2010. Ultimately, Amanpour went back to CNN and Stephanopoulous decided he wanted to return to the position.

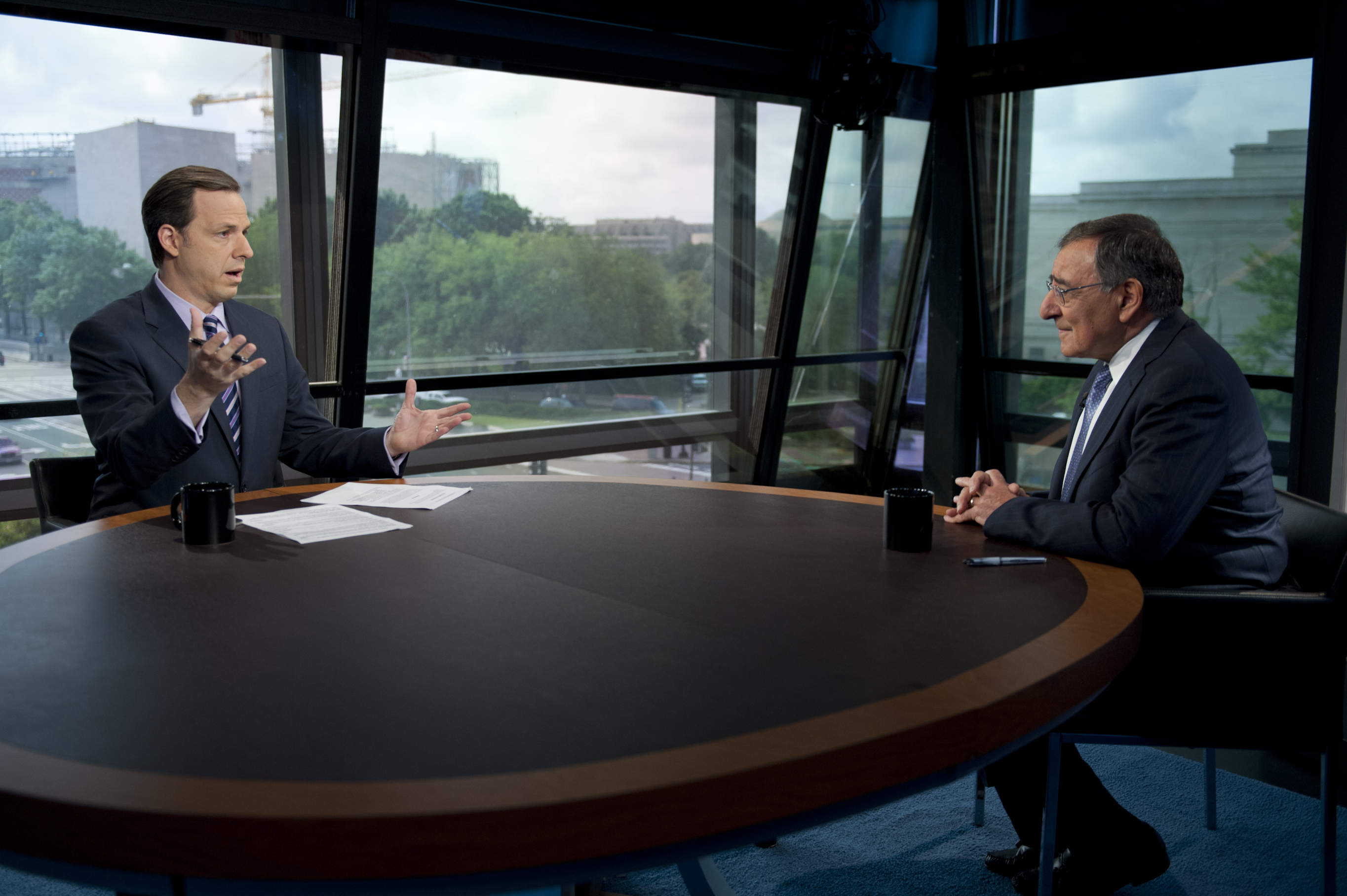
Tapper interviewing U.S. Defense Secretary Leon Panetta in 2012

Tapper contributed regularly to Good Morning America, Nightline, and World News with Diane Sawyer. In addition to anchoring World News and Good Morning America weekend editions and Nightline, Tapper was a frequent substitute host of This Week and served as interim host for much of 2010, scoring the first TV interview with CIA director Leon Panetta, as well as exclusives with Vice President Biden, White House Chief of Staff Rahm Emanuel, retired General Colin Powell, and former Federal Reserve chairman Alan Greenspan, in addition to interviews with other newsmakers, such as House Majority Leader Steny Hoyer (D-Maryland), House Minority Leader John Boehner (R-Ohio), and Senate Minority Leader Mitch McConnell (R-Kentucky).

As senior White House correspondent, Tapper interviewed President Obama several times. Before his assignment at the White House, Tapper was ABC News' national/senior political correspondent based in the network's Washington, D.C., bureau. He contributed a report to a broadcast of World News Tonight with Peter Jennings that won the 2005 Edward R. Murrow Award for best network newscast. As ABC News' lead reporter covering the 2008 presidential election, he received recognition for both breaking stories and even-handedness.

Traveling from Iowa to New Hampshire to South Carolina and beyond, Tapper interviewed both Republican presidential nominee Sen. John McCain (R-Arizona) and presumptive Democratic presidential nominee Sen. Barack Obama (D-Illinois), as well as other White House hopefuls including former Sen. John Edwards (D-North Carolina), former New York City Mayor Rudy Giuliani, former Arkansas Governor Mike Huckabee, New Mexico Governor Bill Richardson, and former Massachusetts Governor Mitt Romney.

=== CNN ===
It was announced December 20, 2012, that Tapper would join CNN and would anchor a new weekday program and serve as the network's chief Washington correspondent. He began with CNN in January 2013, hosting his own program, The Lead with Jake Tapper.

The Lead with Jake Tapper won three National Headliner Awards for its reporting in 2013. Among broadcast television networks, cable networks and syndicators, The Lead with Jake Tapper won first prize for its coverage of the Boston Marathon bombing and second prize for its coverage of the Oklahoma tornadoes in the category of "Coverage of a Major News Event." It won third prize for its coverage of the Boston Marathon bombing in the category of "Continuing Coverage of a Major News Event." In 2014, The Lead was honored for a series of reports on academic fraud at the University of North Carolina at Chapel Hill by correspondent Sara Ganim with a Society of Professional Journalists' Sigma Delta Chi Award for Investigative Reporting.

The Lead was nominated for numerous News & Documentary Emmy Awards, including for Outstanding Live News Broadcast. A report for The Lead by correspondent Isa Sores, called "Madua's Blood Gold", was awarded an Emmy in 2020; a story by Anna Coren on a "9-Year-Old Afghan Sold into Marriage" was awarded an Emmy in 2022.

In January 2015, Tapper's reporting on a new Pentagon policy resulted in the U.S. military changing a rule that was adversely impacting caregivers — "non-medical attendants" or NMAs — for wounded servicemembers. The Pentagon had started to limit reimbursements for NMAs as they worked with servicemembers who had been severely wounded, often with missing limbs or debilitating brain injuries. Upon Tapper's inquiry, the Pentagon reinstated the previous policy.

On the 80th anniversary of D-Day in 2024, Tapper reported on Gold Star families protesting a 2014 change in policy by the American Battle Monuments Commission that had previously allowed families to pay for flowers, which the ABMC would ensure be placed on the graves of their loved ones in cemeteries abroad, such as Normandy. After the piece aired, crediting Tapper, the White House pushed the ABMC to change the policy back.

In June 2015, Tapper became host of CNN's Sunday political show, State of the Union with Jake Tapper. There, he has become known for challenging politicians of all stripes, including challenging Senator Bernie Sanders to release his tax returns; asking Jeb Bush why Hillary Clinton is responsible for Benghazi if his brother George W. Bush bears no responsibility for the terrorist attacks on 9/11; asking Hillary Clinton about the FBI investigation into her private email server; and asking Donald Trump if he would denounce support from white supremacists, the Ku Klux Klan, and David Duke—referred to days later as "the infamous Tapper-Trump exchange" by Mitt Romney in his March 2016 speech condemning Trump.

On September 16, 2015, Tapper moderated two Republican primary debates from the Ronald Reagan Presidential Library in Simi Valley, California. The main debate drew an average of 23.1 million viewers, making it the most watched program in the history of CNN and the second most watched primary debate ever. He also moderated the March 10, 2016, Republican presidential debate in Miami, which drew almost 12 million viewers and according to Variety "garnered acclaim for its substance."

In 2017, he received the Walter Cronkite Award for Excellence in Television Political Journalism from the USC Annenberg School for Communication and Journalism. Also in 2017, he received the John F. Hogan Distinguished Service Award from the Radio Television Digital News Association.

In 2018, Tapper was part of a four-person team at CNN that included Carl Bernstein, Jim Sciutto, and Evan Perez that won the Merriman Smith Award for broadcast reporting on the White House under deadline pressure.

Following the contentious first 2020 presidential election debate, Tapper garnered attention for his response. He called it a "hot mess inside a dumpster fire inside a train wreck".

In January 2021, before the Inauguration of Joe Biden, CNN announced that Tapper's role would expand to be the network's "lead anchor for all major Washington events", including election nights. Additionally, they announced that Dana Bash would join Tapper as a co-host on State of the Union, alternating hosting weeks.

In 2024, Tapper moderated a Republican primary Debate alongside Dana Bash between Ron DeSantis and Nikki Haley before the Iowa caucuses; it was viewed by around 2.6 million people.

Tapper also co-moderated the 2024 presidential election debate between Donald Trump and Joe Biden alongside Bash in which Biden's poor performance led to his withdrawal from the race. While Biden's confused comments and overall frail appearance during the debate led to widespread concerns about his health and stamina, Tapper and Bash were criticized for not fact-checking Trump's many false statements, such as his assertion that Nancy Pelosi had turned down a chance to deploy the National Guard on January 6, 2021. The controversial decision led to discussions among the media and public about journalistic responsibility.

Tapper has received criticism, including from fellow CNN employees, for his coverage of the Gaza war, said by critics to be slanted in Israel's favor. According to media analyst Adam H. Johnson, "In addition to constantly shifting blame for Israeli killing onto anyone other than Israel, Tapper made a habit of either explicitly saying, or more often the case, coyly implying that Israel’s critics were motivated by antisemitism." In a September 2024 interview with Michigan governor Gretchen Whitmer, Tapper and fellow CNN host Dana Bash characterized Michigan U.S. congresswoman Rashida Tlaib's remarks about the attorney general Dana Nessel in an interview with Detroit Metro Times as antisemitic. The Detroit Metro Times fact-checked Tapper's and Bash's comments as false. Tapper subsequently claimed that he was talking about Nessel's view, not his own.

=== Other programs and media ===
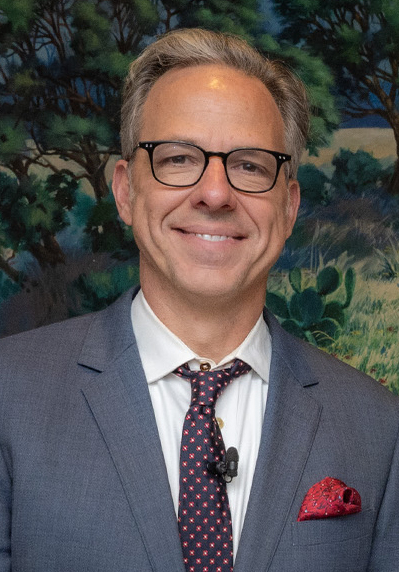
Tapper in 2023

Tapper has contributed to GQ, The Weekly Standard, NPR's All Things Considered, The New York Times, and The Washington Post. In 2001, he hosted the program Take Five on CNN, in which young journalists and commentators discussed politics and pop culture. In 2002, he hosted a series of entertainment news specials on VH1, and in 2003, he hosted shows focused on independent film on the Sundance Channel. Tapper has also been a guest on Jimmy Kimmel Live, The Colbert Report, Late Night with Seth Meyers, Conan, The View, Real Time with Bill Maher, and appeared on the Judge John Hodgman podcast as guest bailiff, standing in for regular bailiff Jesse Thorn during the August 31, 2011, episode entitled "De Plane".

In October 2022, Tapper wrote a cover story for The Atlantic magazine about C.J. Rice, a former patient of his father's serving 30–60 years in prison for a crime his father was convinced Rice was physically incapable of committing. Tapper's story detailed the various ways Rice had inadequate counsel. In December 2023, Rice's conviction was overturned and in March 2024, Rice was exonerated, with Tapper breaking the news that Pennsylvania had freed and dropped the charges against Rice.

Tapper made a cameo in the Halloween-themed episode of The Rookie (October 30, 2022). He wore a Mike Schmidt Philadelphia Phillies jersey; Schmidt was the MVP of the 1980 World Series. Tapper's son, Jack, appeared alongside him, dressed up as Tom Hanks' character Captain Miller from Saving Private Ryan. Tapper and his son watched the show together while locked down due to COVID-19, and he wanted to share his appreciation for the program. Tapper posted a Tweet to Nathan Fillion; according to Tapper, Fillion wrote back and invited the pair for a set visit once COVID protocols were eased. Just before the visit, Fillion asked whether the father and son wanted to film a cameo on the show.

Tapper appears in the background on TV screens as a news correspondent in Superman (2025). He originally had some dialogue, but this was cut.

=== Published works ===
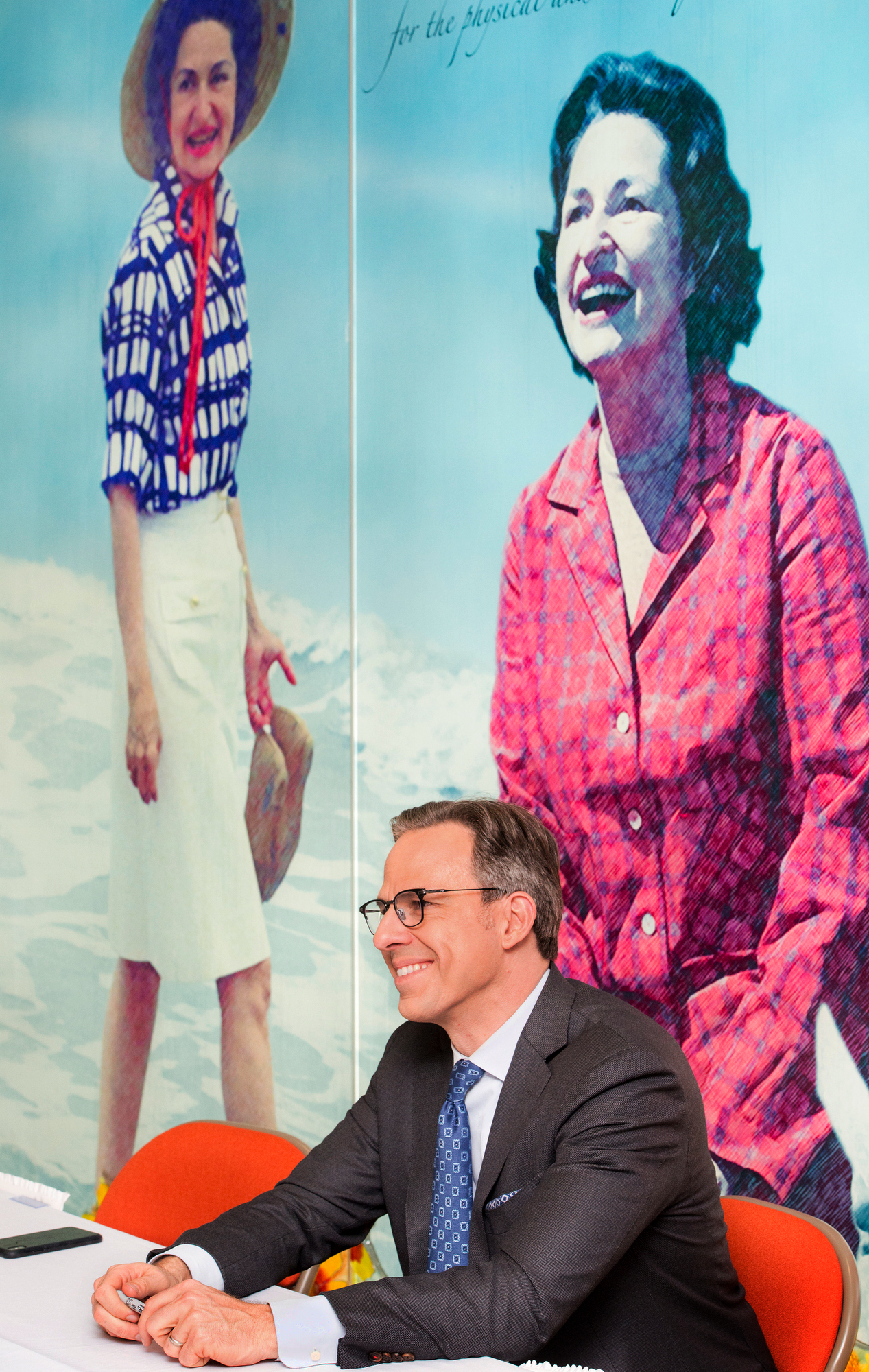
Tapper at the LBJ Presidential Library in 2018

On April 24, 2018, Little, Brown and Company published Tapper's first novel, a political thriller entitled The Hellfire Club. The novel follows a fictitious freshman Congressman discovering corruption and conspiracy in 1950s Washington, at the height of the McCarthy era. The book debuted at Number 3 on the New York Times Best Seller list for Hardcover fiction, and remained on the Best Seller list for four weeks total. The Associated Press called The Hellfire Club "insightful... well-written and worthwhile." Tablet Magazine called the novel "startlingly good." USA Today said the author "sizzles" and "proves he has the page-turning knack in his entertaining debut novel." The sequel to The Hellfire Club, The Devil May Dance, was released in May 2021, and continues the story of the lives of Charlie and Margaret Marder. In 2023, the third volume in the series, All the Demons Are Here, was published.

Tapper is also the author of The Outpost: An Untold Story of American Valor, a critically acclaimed book about U.S. troops in Afghanistan that debuted at number 10 on The New York Times Best Seller list for hardback non-fiction. Bob Woodward described the book as "Brilliant, dedicated reporting by a journalist who goes to ground to get the truth. A sad, real tale about this war, America and the brave warriors who live—and die—at the point of the spear" and Jon Krakauer called it "a mind-boggling, all-too-true story of heroism, hubris, failed strategy, and heartbreaking sacrifice. If you want to understand how the war in Afghanistan went off the rails, you need to read this book."

In 2014, the Congressional Medal of Honor Society recognized Tapper for the book and his reporting on military topics in general with the Tex McCrary Award for Excellence in Journalism. A Rod Lurie-directed film adaptation of The Outpost was released in July 2020, starring Milo Gibson, Orlando Bloom, Scott Eastwood and Caleb Landry Jones.

Tapper is the author of Down and Dirty: The Plot to Steal the Presidency, based on the 2000 Presidential election, that The Washington Post called "lively", the Chicago Tribune called "a churning effusion well worth reading", and The Daily Telegraph called "engrossing". He also wrote Body Slam: The Jesse Ventura Story (St. Martin's Press) that was excerpted by The Washington Post Magazine.

His comic strip Capitol Hell appeared in Roll Call from 1994 to 2003. He has contributed cartoons to The American Spectator magazine, the Los Angeles Times, and The Philadelphia Inquirer. In 2014, Tapper wrote the introduction to The Complete Peanuts 1993 to 1994. During the week of May 23, 2016, Tapper guest-illustrated the Dilbert cartoon. The original drawings were auctioned online to raise money for the Homes for our Troops Foundation.

In 2025, Penguin Press published Tapper's book Original Sin: President Biden's Decline, Its Cover-up, and His Disastrous Choice to Run Again, which he co-authored with Alex Thompson.

== Awards and honors ==
As the Senior White House Correspondent for ABC News, Tapper was honored with three Merriman Smith Memorial Awards for broadcast journalism. The first Merriman Smith Memorial Award was for reporting noncompliance of laws regulating tax reporting by the Department of Health and Human Services secretary nominee and former Senate majority leader Tom Daschle, troubles that ultimately derailed Daschle's nomination. The second was for the 2010 story that President Obama had asked for the resignation of his Director of National Intelligence, Admiral Dennis C. Blair (retired).

The third time was for breaking the 2011 story that the ratings agency Standard and Poor's was expected to downgrade the United States' AAA rating for government debt. As a CNN anchor, he was awarded his fourth Merriman Smith Award in 2018 as part of a team that broke the news that President-elect Donald Trump and President Obama had been briefed on the Steele dossier alleging that Russia had blackmail material on Trump.

In 2017, Tapper won several awards, including the Walter Cronkite Award for Excellence in Political Journalism. The judges pointed to his fearless advocacy for the truth and relentless interviewing style. He also won RTDNA's John F. Hogan Distinguished Service Award, which "recognizes an individual's contributions to the journalism profession and freedom of the press", and CJF's Tribute Award, which awards those who uphold the highest standards of journalism and inspire journalists around the world. Moment Magazine gave him its inaugural Robert S. Greenberger Journalism Award for his "relentless quest for the truth and accountability". The Dartmouth Club of Washington gave him the Daniel Webster Award for Distinguished Public Service.

In 2018, Tapper won a Vetty, recognizing his coverage of veterans' issues. He has served alongside press corps veterans in Washington, D.C., for 14 years.

In July 2009, television personality Dan Abrams launched a website, Mediaite, reporting on media figures and ranking all TV-based journalists in America by influence; for December 2010, Tapper ranked at number two. He remains a mainstay of the annual list, recognized in 2018 for his "ability to hold Republicans and Democrats to account equally" and "his 2018 noteworthy moments; the harrowing Parkland town hall, a stellar one-on-one with James Comey, and his regular sparring matches with Trump officials."

In 2022, Mediate called Tapper "the top dog who could represent the CNN brand." In 2023, he ranked number seven and it was noted that his "skills as an interrogator are arguably unrivaled on cable news right now." In 2024, Tapper was ranked 23rd and recognized as one of America's preeminent anchors, earning headlines for moderating a presidential debate and championing the release of C.J. Rice, a man wrongfully convicted of a 2011 shooting.

In 2016, The Lead was honored with two National Headliner Awards: Best Newscast (Broadcast Television Networks, Cable Networks, and Syndicators) and Best Coverage of a Major News Event (Broadcast Television Networks, Cable Networks, and Syndicators Newscast) for the show's coverage of the November 2015 Paris attacks.

The Los Angeles Press Club gave Tapper its 2017 President's Award for Impact on Media. "During a divisive election, Jake Tapper was willing to take on politicians from both sides of the aisle", the Press Club president said. "His effective interview style cuts to the core. He is willing to ask the tough questions, listen carefully, and then follow up with precisely the right response to get to the heart of the matter."

Also in 2017, Tapper was named Radio Television Digital News Association's John F. Hogan Distinguished Service Award winner. The award "recognizes an individual's contributions to the journalism profession and freedom of the press."

Tapper has two honorary degrees, from UMass Amherst and Dartmouth.

Tapper won an Emmy Awards in 2023 for Outstanding Live Breaking News Coverage as part of the team that covered the Russian invasion of Ukraine and for Outstanding Live News Special for being one of the co-anchors of "Live from the Capitol: January 6, One Year Later". He also won an Emmy Awards in 2024 for Outstanding Live News Special for "A CNN Town Hall: Toxic Train Disaster, Ohio Residents Speak Out", which he hosted, and for Outstanding Live Breaking News Coverage for being part of the team that covered the Gaza war.

== Personal life ==
Tapper married Jennifer Marie Brown, a former Planned Parenthood official, in 2006 in her home state of Missouri. They live in Washington, D.C. with their two children. In June 2024, pro-Palestinian activists protested outside Tapper's home over his coverage of the Gaza war.

Tapper went on a platonic date with Monica Lewinsky in December 1997, a few weeks before news broke of the Clinton–Lewinsky scandal. He wrote about the experience in a January 1998 issue of the Washington City Paper. The two later discussed the date on an October 5, 2021 episode of his CNN program, The Lead with Jake Tapper. That same day, the date was dramatized in the television series Impeachment: American Crime Story in the fifth episode "Do You Hear What I Hear?", in which Tapper was portrayed by Chris Riggi.

== Bibliography ==
- Tapper, Jake (1999). Body Slam: The Jesse Ventura Story. St. Martin's Paperbacks. ISBN 9781466876323.
- Tapper, Jake (2001). Down & Dirty: The Plot to Steal the Presidency. Little, Brown and Company. ISBN 9780316832649.
- Tapper, Jake (2012). The Outpost: An Untold Story of American Valor. Little, Brown and Company. ISBN 9780008332853.
- Tapper, Jake (2018). The Hellfire Club (Charlie and Margaret Marder Mystery). Little, Brown and Company. ISBN 9780316472302.
- Tapper, Jake (2021). The Devil May Dance: A Novel (Charlie and Margaret Marder Mystery, 2). Little, Brown and Company. ISBN 9780316530231.
- Tapper, Jake (2023). All the Demons Are Here: A Thriller (Charlie and Margaret Marder Mystery, 3). Little, Brown and Company. ISBN 9780316424592.
- Tapper, Jake; Thompson, Alex (2025). Original Sin: President Biden's Decline, Its Cover-Up, and His Disastrous Choice to Run Again. Penguin Press. ISBN 9798217060672.

Media offices
| New office | CNN Chief Washington Correspondent; January 2013 – Present | Incumbent |
| Preceded by Martha Raddatz | ABC News Chief White House Correspondent; January 2009 – December 2012 | Succeeded by Jonathan Karl |
