= The Devil May Dance =

2021 political novel by Jake Tapper

- First edition
- Author: Jake Tapper
- Language: English
- Genre: Political thriller
- Set in: 1960s Los Angeles
- Publisher: Little, Brown and Company
- Publication date: May 11, 2021
- Publication place: United States
- Pages: 327

The Devil May Dance is a novel authored by Jake Tapper.

== Setting ==
The book takes place during the Kennedy presidency, where the main character, Congressman Charlie Marder and his wife Margaret were assigned by Attorney General Robert F. Kennedy to find out if Frank Sinatra was connected to the Mafia in any way, as he was worried if Kennedy stayed in Sinatra's house in Rancho Mirage, the mafia might try to kill him. In the book they meet famous performers from Los Angeles in The Rat Pack, such as Dean Martin, and Peter Lawford, and members of the Mafia, like Sam "Momo" Giancana.

== Reception ==
Robert Barnett, a literary agent at Williams & Connolly, reviewed the book for Publishers Weekly stating that "Tapper makes good use of the rich source material. Fans of Max Allan Collins’s Nathan Heller books will be pleased."
