= State of the Union (American TV program) =

American Sunday talk show hosted by Dana Bash

- Also known as: State of the Union with Jake Tapper & Dana Bash
- Directed by: Reza Baktar
- Presented by: Dana Bash Jake Tapper
- Country of origin: United States

Production
- Production location: CNN Studios Washington, D.C.
- Running time: 60 minutes

Original release
- Network: CNN; CNN International
- Release: January 18, 2009 – present

Related
- The Lead with Jake Tapper; Inside Politics; Fareed Zakaria GPS

State of the Union, branded as State of the Union with Jake Tapper and Dana Bash, is an American Sunday talk show and political discussion television program on CNN and broadcast around the world by CNN International. It has been co-anchored by Jake Tapper since 2015 and Dana Bash since 2021. It has been broadcast since its debut in January 2009.

The program is broadcast from 9:00 am to 10:00 am ET, with a replay at noon to 1:00 pm ET from CNN's studios in Washington, D.C.

== History ==
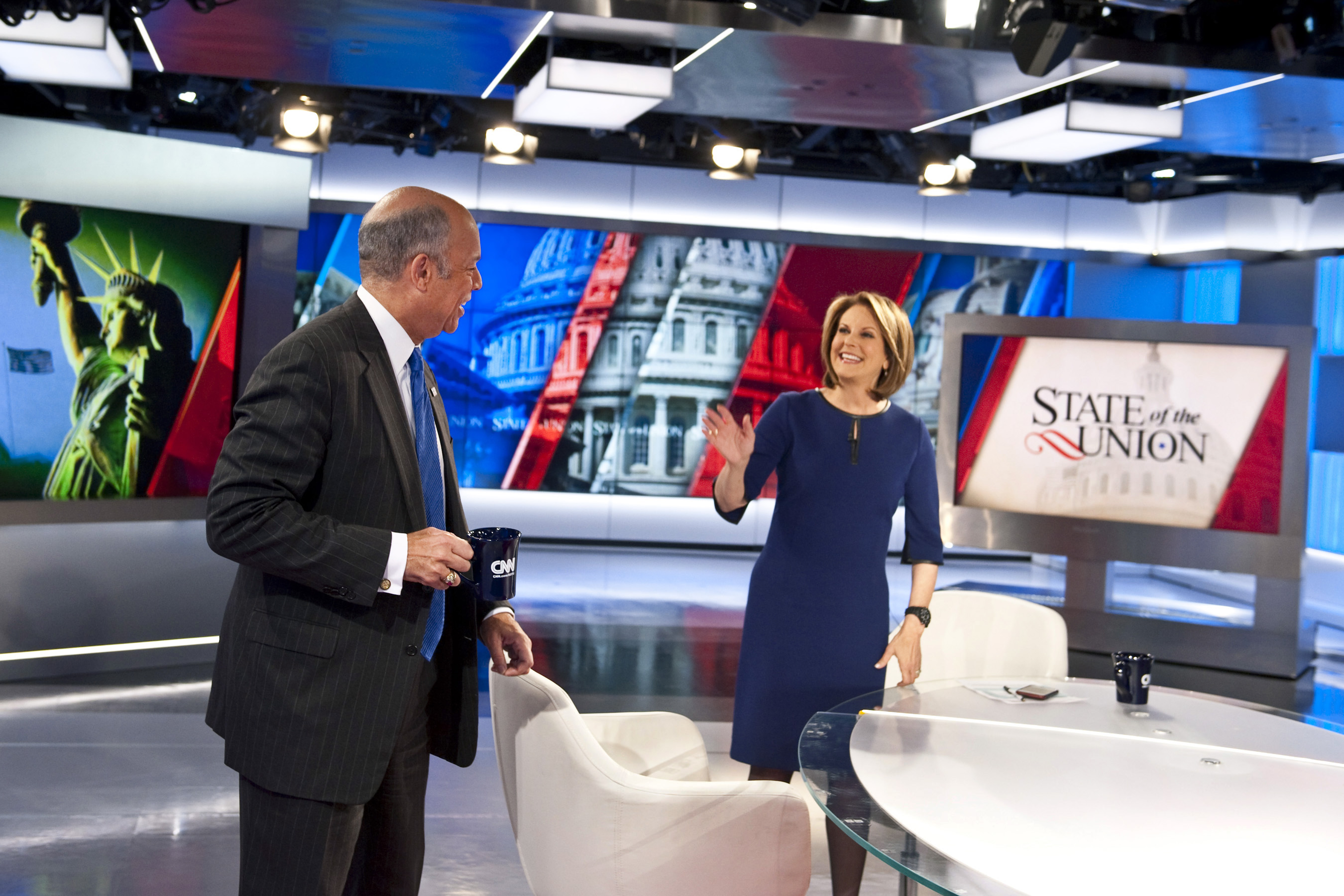
State of the Union set in 2015

The program premiered on January 18, 2009, originally with John King as host, and aired from 9:00 am to 1:00 pm ET (though only the 9:00 am and noon ET hours are simulcast on CNN International) and from 8:00 pm to 9:00 pm ET. It features news analysis and interviews with politicians, reporters, and newsmakers, as well as the "Magic Wall", an interactive touch screen map previously used by King to cover the 2008 presidential election. At four hours long, it was by far the longest of the Sunday talk shows. It was created as a merger between Reliable Sources and Late Edition with Wolf Blitzer; Reliable Sources continued unchanged as a one-hour "segment" of State of the Union. On February 11, 2009, CNN announced it had hired former Meet the Press producer Michelle Jaconi as the executive producer of the program.

On a January 31, 2010, broadcast, John King announced that senior political correspondent Candy Crowley would become the new anchor of the program, following King's move to take over Lou Dobbs' former timeslot. In the move, the program was cut from four hours to one, and the Reliable Sources "show within a show" was spun off once again as its own program.

After Crowley left CNN in December 2014, State of the Union had a series of fill-ins until Jake Tapper was named permanent host in April 2015. In January 2021, CNN announced that Dana Bash would join Tapper as a co-host, with the two alternating Sundays hosting.

Preceded by Inside Politics	CNN Sunday lineup 9:00 am – 10:00 am 12:00 pm – 1:00 pm (replay)	Succeeded by Fareed Zakaria GPS
