= The Hellfire Club (novel) =

2018 political novel by Jake Tapper

- First edition
- Author: Jake Tapper
- Language: English
- Genre: political thriller
- Set in: 1950s Washington, D.C.
- Publisher: Little, Brown and Company
- Publication date: April 24, 2018
- Publication place: United States
- Pages: 352
- ISBN: 978-0-316-47231-9

The Hellfire Club is the second novel published by American journalist Jake Tapper. The book tells the story of a fictitious freshman Congressman, Charlie Marder, as he is introduced into United States politics. Throughout the story, Marder encounters numerous real-life politicians, including John and Robert F. Kennedy, Lyndon B. Johnson, and Joseph McCarthy.
