= Kristen Welker =

American journalist (born 1976)

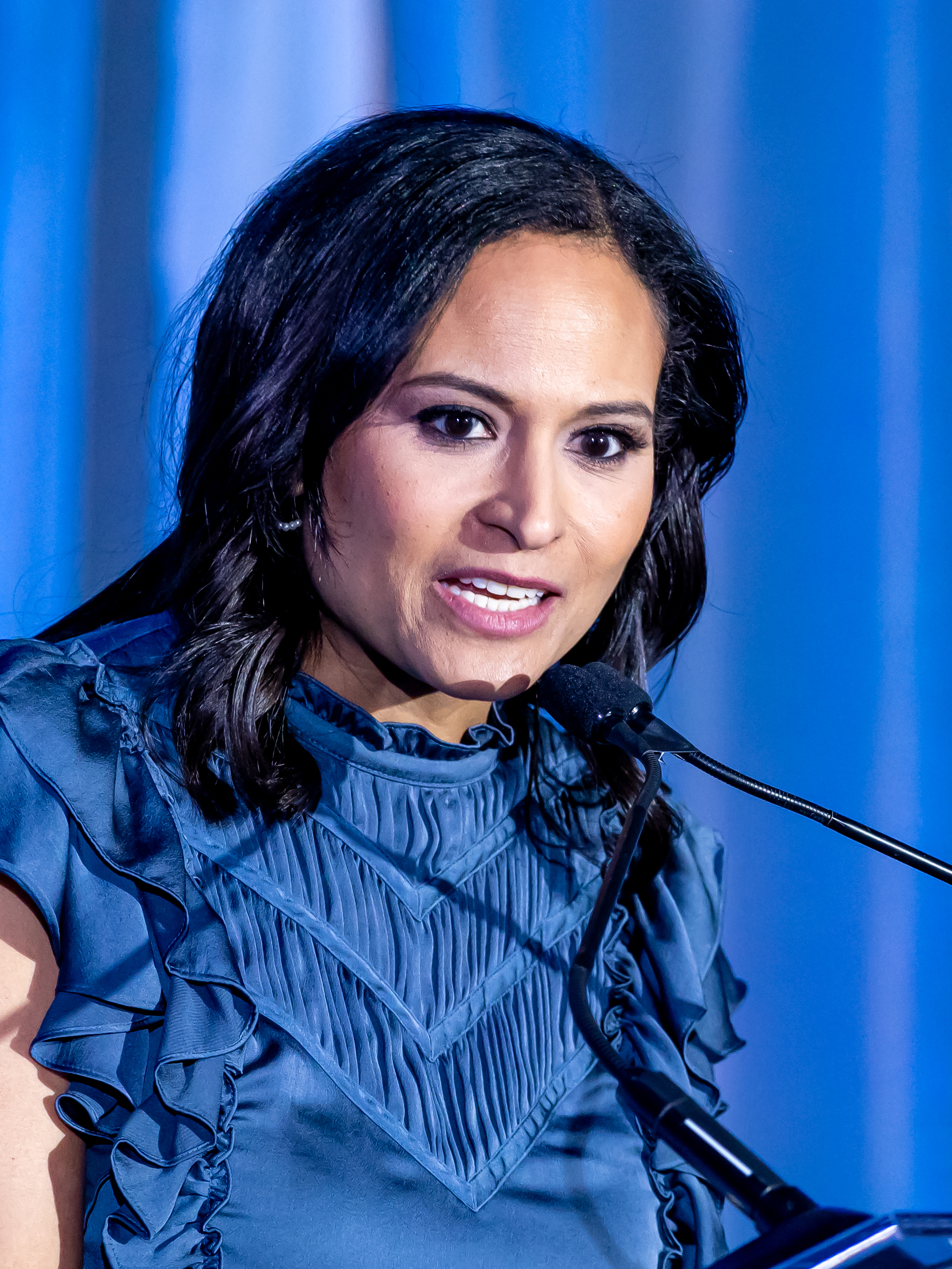
- Welker in 2024
- Born: July 1, 1976 (age 50); Philadelphia, Pennsylvania, U.S.
- Education: Harvard University (BA)
- Occupations: Journalist; correspondent
- Employer: NBC News
- Spouse: John Hughes (m. 2017)
- Children: 2

Kristen Welker (born July 1, 1976) is an American television journalist working for NBC News. She serves as a White House correspondent based in Washington, D.C., and served as co-anchor of Weekend Today, the Saturday edition of Today, alongside Peter Alexander from 2020 to 2023. She took over hosting duties for the longest-running program in American television history, Meet the Press, on September 17, 2023.

== Early life ==
Kristen Welker is the daughter of Harvey and Julie Welker. Her father is an engineer, her mother a real estate agent. Welker's father is Jewish and her mother is African American. She graduated from the private Germantown Friends School in Philadelphia in 1994.

Welker received a Bachelor of Arts (magna cum laude) with a major in American history from Harvard College in 1998. She interned for the TV program Today in 1997.

== Career ==
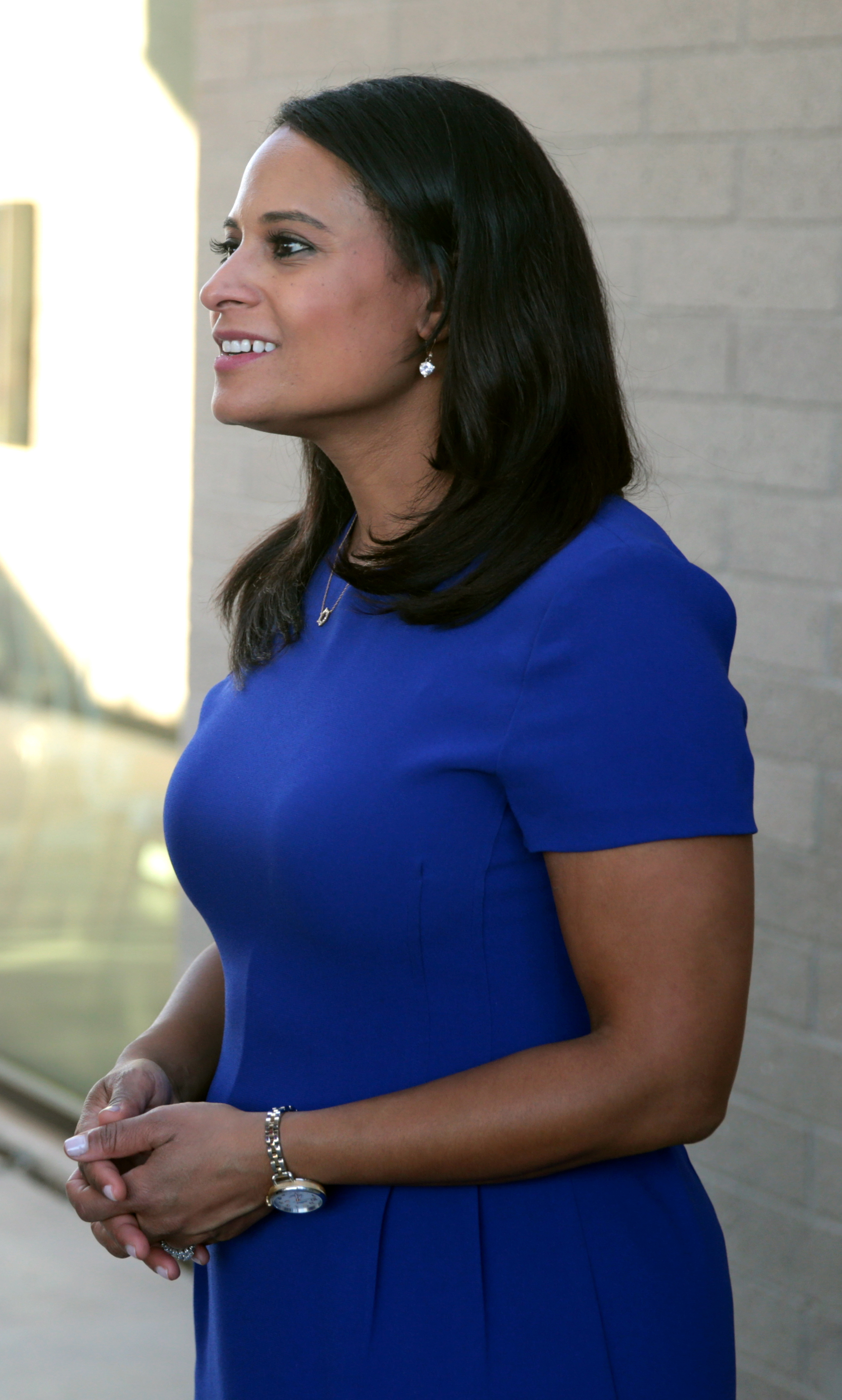
Welker in 2018

Welker has worked at ABC affiliates WLNE-TV in Providence, Rhode Island, and KRCR-TV in Redding/Chico, California, and joined NBC in 2005 at affiliate WCAU in Philadelphia, where she was a reporter and weekend anchor. She then joined NBC News in 2010 as a correspondent based at the NBC News West Coast Headquarters in Burbank, California. She became an NBC White House correspondent in December 2011.

Welker regularly represented MSNBC at the daily White House press briefings as well as reported live for various programs on the channel. She occasionally filled in on NBC Nightly News and Today. On January 10, 2020, NBC announced that Welker would become the regular co-anchor of Weekend Today alongside Peter Alexander. She debuted as co-anchor on Weekend Today on January 11, 2020.

In the second debate of the 2020 United States presidential election, the Commission on Presidential Debates assigned Kristen Welker as the moderator. She coordinated the candidates' presentations by posing potential voters' questions and tracking their responses. The format had the moderator ask questions and allow each candidate 120 seconds to answer. The other participant could not speak until the corresponding candidate's turn ended, and Welker stated that it was the opponent's time to convey its position. At the end of the debate, Susan Page and Chris Wallace approved her performance as a moderator, saying she coordinated the timing of each candidate's responses effectively and prevented interruptions. Donald Trump, a presidential candidate in this contest, also expressed support for Welker's performance as a moderator.

In September 2023, Welker succeeded Chuck Todd as anchor of the Sunday morning program Meet the Press and its weekday spin-off Meet the Press Now on NBC News NOW. On September 17, 2023, during her debut show as host, she interviewed former U.S President Donald Trump. The interview was criticized by some who felt that Welker did not give enough pushback to Trump's falsehoods and conspiracy theories, or that the typical sit-down interview format served to falsely normalize Trump as a politician. In a piece for the Los Angeles Times, Lorraine Ali wrote, "The set-up validated long-held complaints of bothside-ism in legacy journalism, when an issue between opposing beliefs is presented as more balanced than evidence supports."

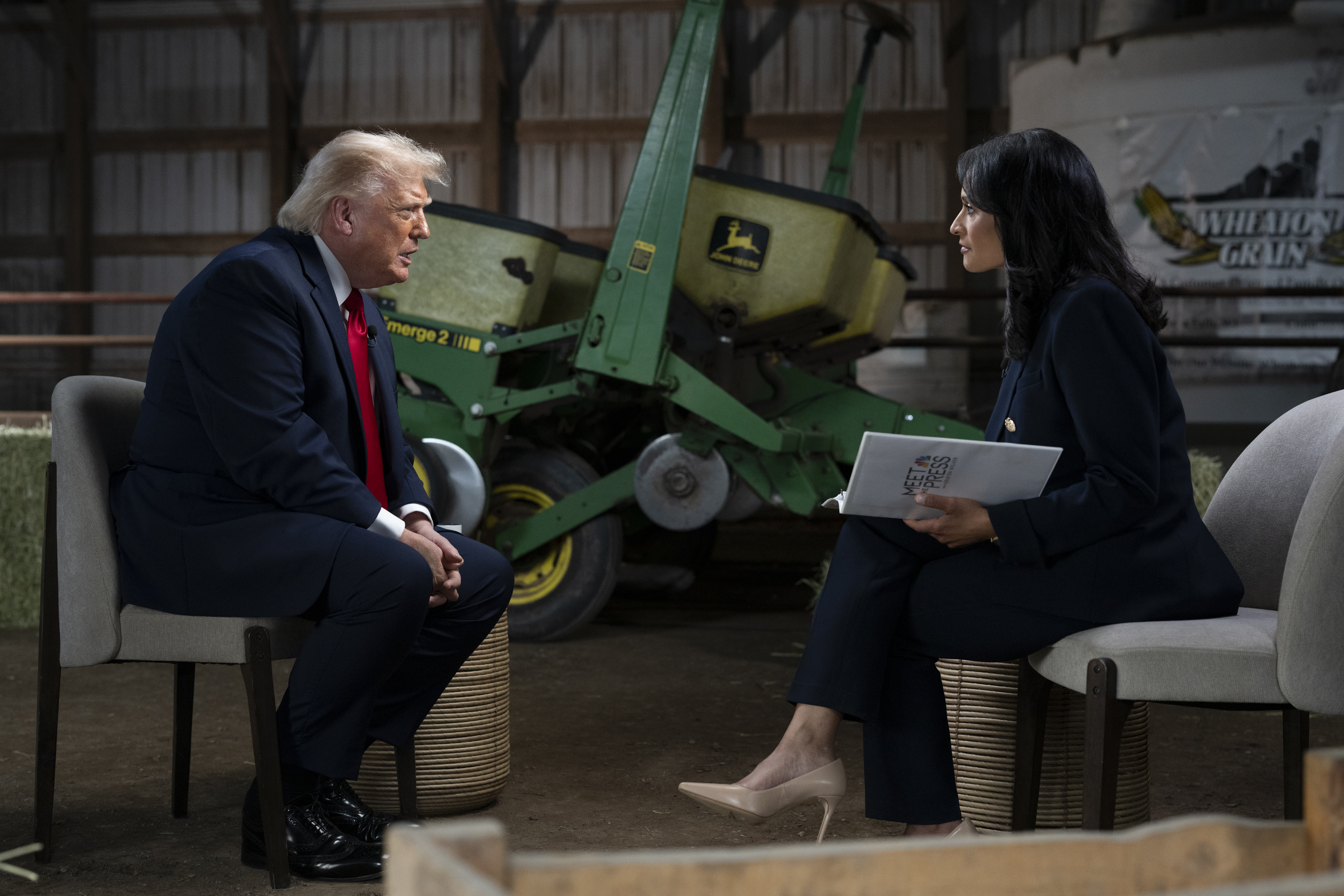
Welker interviews President Donald Trump in June 2026

On November 8, 2023, she co-moderated the third 2024 GOP primary debate alongside Lester Holt and Hugh Hewitt in Miami, Florida. Presidential candidate Vivek Ramaswamy started off by calling her a member of the "corrupt media establishment" and accusing her of pushing "the Trump–Russia collusion hoax". Welker grinned and ignored the attack and Holt moved on.

On May 4, 2025, Welker interviewed Donald Trump on Meet the Press for the second time. This interview received some notoriety after Trump responded "I don't know" when asked if he would uphold the U.S. Constitution as president.

On June 7, 2026, Welker's third interview with Trump ended abruptly when he left after Welker challenged his false claims that the 2020 presidential election and the 2026 California primary elections were "rigged".

On August 30, 2026, Donald Trump said he would refer Welker to the FCC for "rebuke or punishment," after she noted that the president's success in endorsing political candidates has been mixed.

== Personal life ==
Welker married marketing executive John Hughes in Philadelphia on March 4, 2017. She has publicly discussed her struggles with infertility. They have two children born by surrogacy, a daughter in June 2021 and a son in May 2024.

== Awards and recognition ==
- 2023: Named among Glamour's "Women of the Year" for breaking barriers in broadcast journalism.
- Harvard College — Magna cum laude, Bachelor of Arts in American history (1998).
- Germantown Friends School (Philadelphia) graduate, 1994.

== See also ==
- List of Harvard University people
- List of American network TV Sunday morning talk shows
