= Moneyline =

Moneyline may refer to:

- Moneyline odds, a form of fixed-odds gambling also known as American odds
- Moneyline, renamed Lou Dobbs Moneyline in 2001 and Lou Dobbs Tonight in 2003, a television series hosted by Lou Dobbs on Cable News Network
