= John King (journalist) =

American journalist (born 1962/63)

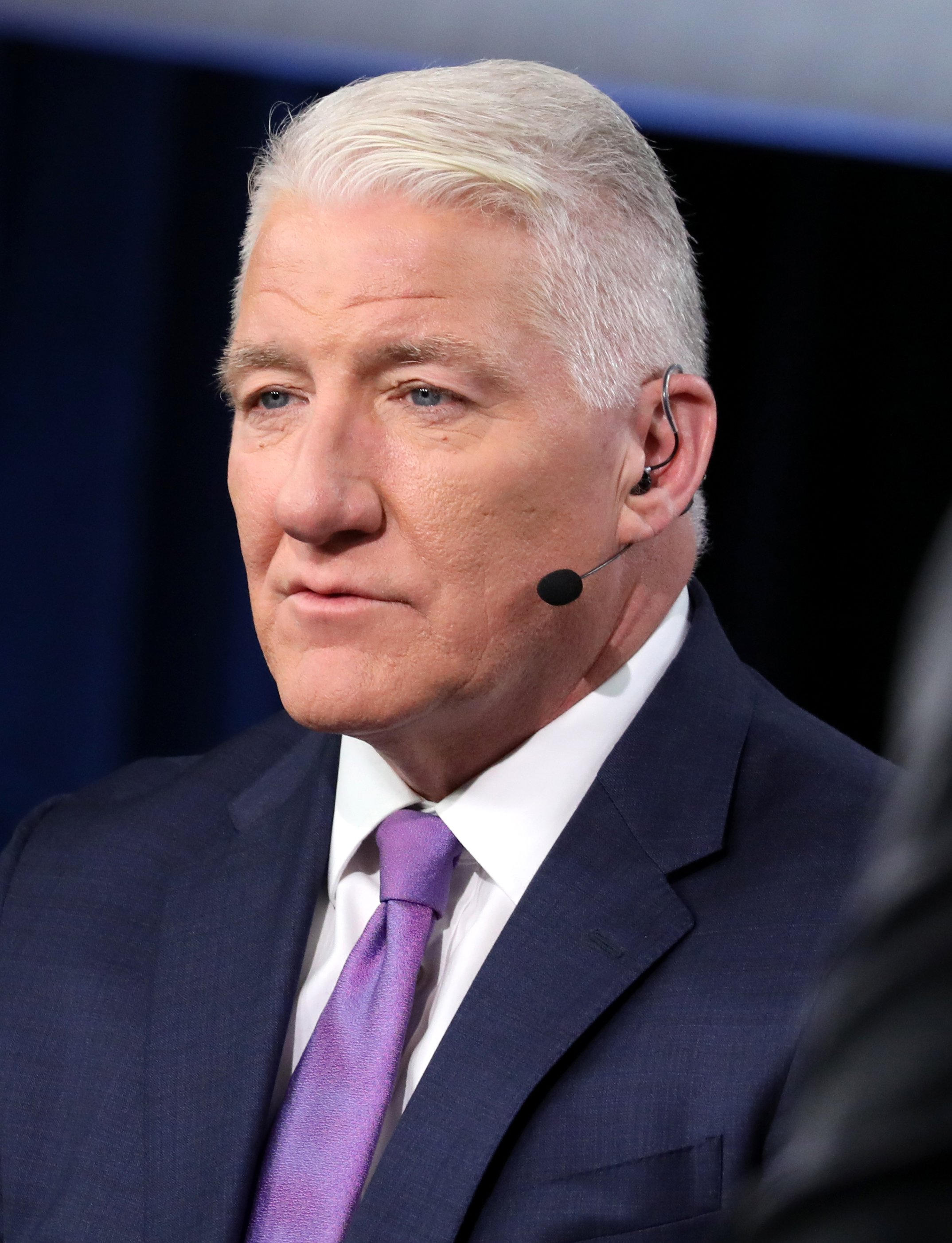
- King in 2024
- Born: 1962 or 1963 (age 62–63); Boston, Massachusetts, U.S.
- Education: University of Rhode Island (BA)
- Spouses: Jean Makie (divorced); Dana Bash (m. 2008; div. 2012)
- Children: 3 (1 with Bash)

John King (born 1962 or 1963) is an American news anchor. He is CNN's chief national correspondent, based in Washington, D.C.. He formerly anchored Inside Politics, State of the Union, and John King, USA.

== Personal life ==
King was born in Boston. He is of Irish Catholic descent with ancestors from Dún Locháin, Co. Galway. He attended Boston Latin School, and earned a bachelor's degree in journalism from the University of Rhode Island. John King and Jean Makie, his first wife, have two children, named Noah and Hannah.

After divorcing Makie, King married his second wife, fellow CNN anchor Dana Bash on May 25, 2008. Before marrying Bash, King (previously a Roman Catholic) converted to Judaism, Bash's religion. Bash and King have a son, Jonah, who was born in June 2011. The couple separated in March 2012.

On October 19, 2021, King revealed on his show Inside Politics that he has multiple sclerosis and is thus immunocompromised. The following day, he revealed to CNN New Day anchor John Berman that he had been diagnosed 13 years earlier. According to King, he had problems feeling his legs since covering the Clinton administration in the late 1990s. After those problems worsened during the 2008 presidential campaign, he received his diagnosis.

== Career ==
In 1985, King joined the Associated Press where he began as a writer. In 1991, King was named chief political correspondent and headed the AP's political coverage of the 1992 and 1996 presidential elections. Also in 1991, King won the top reporting prize from the Associated Press Managing Editors Association for his coverage of the Gulf War in Kuwait.

In 1997, King joined CNN where he served as the senior White House correspondent from 1999 to 2005. In 2005, King was named CNN's chief national correspondent, a position he still holds. From 2014 to 2021, he anchored the Sunday morning (and more frequently during presidential-election years) news program Inside Politics, which features a rotating roundtable of members of the media who share their insights of current political topics with King. He frequently appears on the nightly news programs The Situation Room and Anderson Cooper 360° and sometimes fills in as anchor.

King uses the Multi-Touch Collaboration Wall, nicknamed the "Magic Wall" or "Magic Map". First used during the primaries of the 2008 presidential campaign, it allows him to display and manipulate graphics and maps of polling and election results. He and the Multi-Touch Collaboration Wall have both been featured in a Daily Show segment, as well as CNN coverage of the US Presidential Election in 2016 and 2020.

Just prior to the 2009 US presidential inauguration, King began hosting a new talk show State of the Union, which replaced CNN's Late Edition with Wolf Blitzer. With Lou Dobbs' sudden resignation from the network on November 12, 2009, CNN announced that King would take over Dobbs' timeslot in early 2010. On January 31, 2010, King announced that CNN's senior political reporter, Candy Crowley, would replace him as anchor of State of the Union. King began hosting his new weeknight show John King, USA, on March 22, 2010. On May 1, 2011, John King was the CNN anchor who confirmed the death of Osama bin Laden to their viewers.

On January 19, 2012, King moderated a Republican presidential debate before the South Carolina Primary.

John King, USA was canceled in early 2012, with the final episode airing on June 29, 2012.

On April 17, 2013, King, citing law enforcement sources, erroneously reported that a suspect in the April 15, 2013 Boston Marathon bombing had been identified by police and that the suspect was a dark-skinned male. King was the first to erroneously report on this identification of a suspect; other news outlets, such as Fox News, soon erroneously reported that a suspect had been arrested.

King received widespread praise for his coverage of the 2020 United States presidential election.

From 2016 to 2023, King hosted the weekday edition of the CNN morning show Inside Politics.

On January 11, 2021, Abby Phillip was announced as the new anchor on the Sunday edition of Inside Politics, replacing King, starting Sunday, January 24, 2021. The new show is called Inside Politics Sunday with Abby Phillip. In April 2023, it was announced that his colleague and ex-wife Dana Bash would succeed him as solo anchor of Inside Politics in mid-June, while he embarked on a new project dealing with election politics.

Media offices
Preceded by Wolf Blitzer	CNN Senior White House Correspondent; 1999–2005	Succeeded by Ed Henry
