= Sheila Tate =

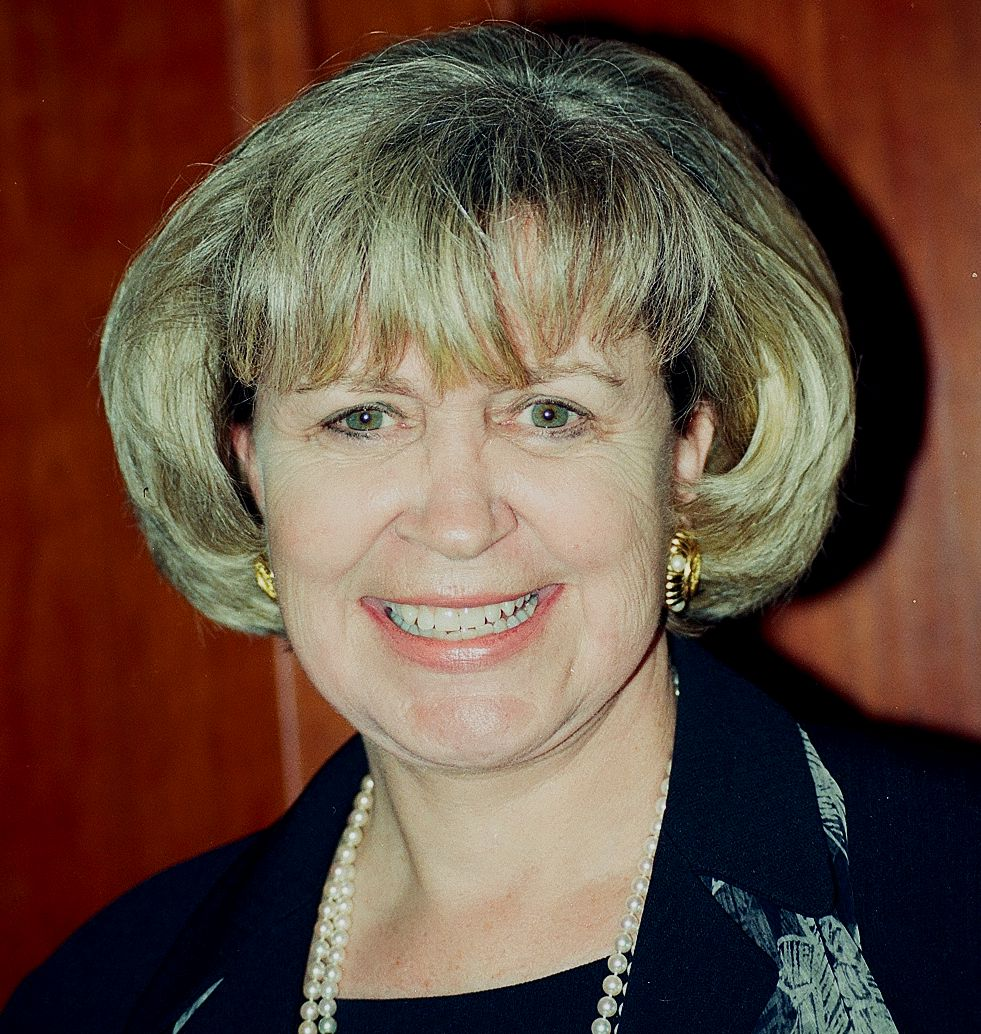
Tate in 1998

Sheila Tate is a former American government official. She served as First Lady Nancy Reagan's press secretary from 1981 to 1985.

== Works ==
- Tate, Sheila (2018). Lady in Red: An Intimate Portrait of Nancy Reagan. New York: Crown Publishing. ISBN 9781524762193. OCLC 994517804.
