= Stuart Schwartz =

American television producer

Stuart Alan Schwartz
- Born: November 23, 1944 (age 81); Chicago, Illinois, U.S.
- Education: Northwestern University (BS, MS)
- Alma mater: Northwestern University
- Occupations: Television producer; lecturer; adjunct professor
- Employer: ABC News
- Spouse: Frances Weinman Schwartz
- Children: 2, including Dana Bash

Stuart Schwartz is a television producer who served as senior producer for ABC News known for his work on World News Tonight, Nightline, Day One, 20/20 and Good Morning America. Over his career, he earned 15 Emmy Awards, four Peabody Awards, two DuPont Awards, and an Overseas Press Club Award.

== Biography ==
Schwartz was the son of Sally (née Lasky) and David Schwartz. He is a graduate of Lakeview High School in Chicago. In 1966, he graduated with a B.S. from Northwestern University; and in 1967 with a M.S. in Journalism (1967) from Northwestern's Medill School of Journalism. He worked as producer of ABC World News Tonight, Nightline, and the ABC Evening News and Weekend News. He served as senior broadcast producer for the newsmagazines Prime Time Live, 20/20, Day One, and Good Morning America.

He retired in 2009 after 41 years at ABC News. After retirement, he took a position as an adjunct lecturer at the Philip Merrill College of Journalism at the University of Maryland.

== Personal life ==
He is married to Frances Weinman Schwartz, an educator in Jewish Studies and author of Jewish Moral Virtues and Passage to Pesach. His daughter is CNN journalist and anchor Dana Bash.
