= Dana Bash =

American journalist (born 1971)

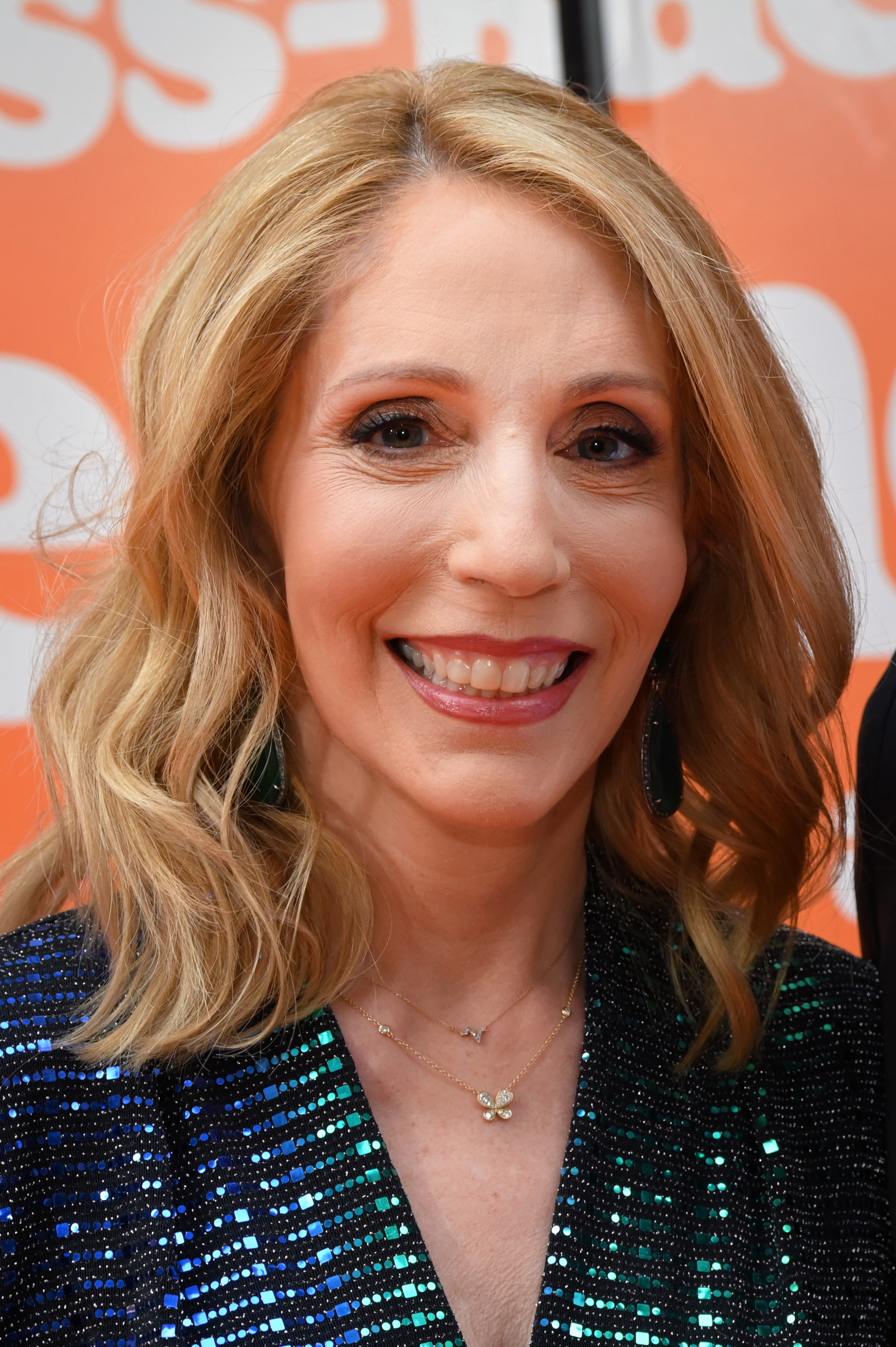
- Bash in 2026
- Born: Dana Ruth Schwartz; June 15, 1971 (age 55); New York City, U.S.
- Education: George Washington University (BA)
- Occupations: Journalist; news anchor
- Employer: CNN
- Spouses: Jeremy Bash (m. 1998; div. 2007) John King (m. 2008; div. 2012)
- Children: 1
- Relatives: Stuart Schwartz (father)

Dana Ruth Bash (Note: Pronounced /ˈdænə/ DAN-ah) (née Schwartz; born June 15, 1971) is an American journalist, news anchor, host of Inside Politics and co-anchor of State of the Union on CNN.

== Early life and education ==
Bash was born Dana Ruth Schwartz in Manhattan into a Jewish family, to Frances (née Weinman) Schwartz, an author and educator in Jewish studies, and Stuart Schwartz, an ABC News producer who served as the senior broadcast producer for Good Morning America. Bash's maternal grandmother, Teri Vidor Weinman, and her family were Hungarian Jews. Weinman escaped to the U.S. with her husband in October 1941, but her parents and sister were murdered at Auschwitz concentration camp after the occupation of Hungary in 1944.

Bash moved with her family to Teaneck, New Jersey, and shortly thereafter to Washington, D.C., returning to Montvale, New Jersey, as a preteen. Bash attended Pascack Hills High School in Montvale. She graduated cum laude with a bachelor's degree in political communications from George Washington University. While at college, she interned at NBC, CBS, and CNN. In May 2018, Bash received an honorary Doctorate of Humane Letters from Franklin Pierce University in Rindge, New Hampshire.

== Career ==
After college, Bash joined CNN as a producer of their weekend programs such as Late Edition, Evans & Novak, and Inside Politics (later occasionally filling in for regular host John King). Later, she began producing programming specializing in coverage of the United States Senate, eventually becoming CNN's Chief Congressional Correspondent.

Bash was one of the women honored at Elle magazine's 2014 "Women in Washington Power List" event.

Bash was host of the 2019 Democratic presidential primary debate where Kamala Harris was noted for making her "that little girl was me" statement to Joe Biden.

In 2021, Bash joined Jake Tapper to become co-host of CNN's Sunday morning show State of The Union.

In April 2023, CNN announced that Bash would succeed her former husband, John King, as solo anchor of Inside Politics.

In 2024, she co-moderated a Republican primary debate in Iowa alongside Tapper between Nikki Haley and Ron DeSantis. She also co-moderated the 2024 presidential debate between Donald Trump and Joe Biden, also alongside Tapper.

In 2024, Hanover Square Press published her book, written with David Fisher, about the 1872 Louisiana gubernatorial election. It is titled America's Deadliest Election: The Shocking True Story of the Election that Changed American History.

=== Coverage of Israel ===
Bash has received criticism, including from fellow CNN employees, for her coverage of the Gaza war that has been described as slanted in favor of Israel. Following the 2023 October 7 attacks and during the Gaza war, Bash has criticized pro-Palestinian advocacy on CNN. A CNN insider told Zeteo in 2026 that Bash is "a huge advocate for the state of Israel, and just doesn't really conceal that very well".

In September 2024, in an interview with Michigan governor Gretchen Whitmer, Bash and Tapper misrepresented a statement from Michigan U.S. congresswoman Rashida Tlaib in an interview with the Detroit Metro Times, falsely rendering her criticism of Michigan attorney general Dana Nessel for prosecuting pro-Palestinian protesters as antisemitic. After rebuke from the Detroit Metro Times, Tapper said in an interview with Nessel that he "misspoke" and that he "was trying to characterize [Nessel's] views of Tlaib's comments".

In an August 2026 appearance on comedian Bill Maher's show, Bash agreed with Maher's claims that the Democratic Party is antisemitic, and said that Democrats accusing Israel of committing genocide in Gaza are doing so for "likes on their social media."

== Personal life ==
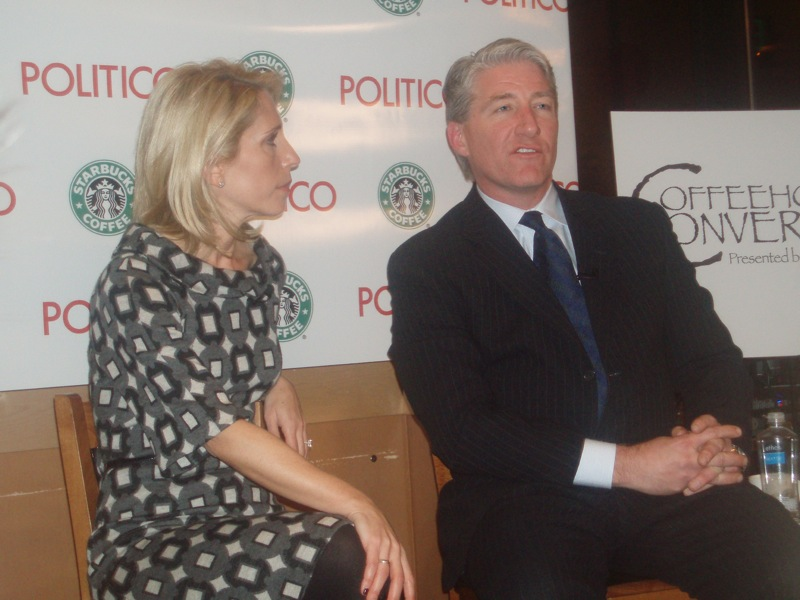
Bash and John King in 2009

From 1998 to 2007, Bash was married to Jeremy Bash, who would become CIA chief of staff and Department of Defense chief of staff under President Barack Obama. In 2008, she married fellow CNN correspondent John King. Bash gave birth to a son in 2011; she and King divorced in 2012.

Bash has been in a relationship with actor Spencer Garrett since 2013.

In 2011, she resigned as a trustee of Jewish Women International under pressure over its abortion-rights advocacy. A number of conservative blogs had highlighted the group's position on abortion after Bash accepted the trustee position.
