= Abby Phillip =

American journalist (born 1988)

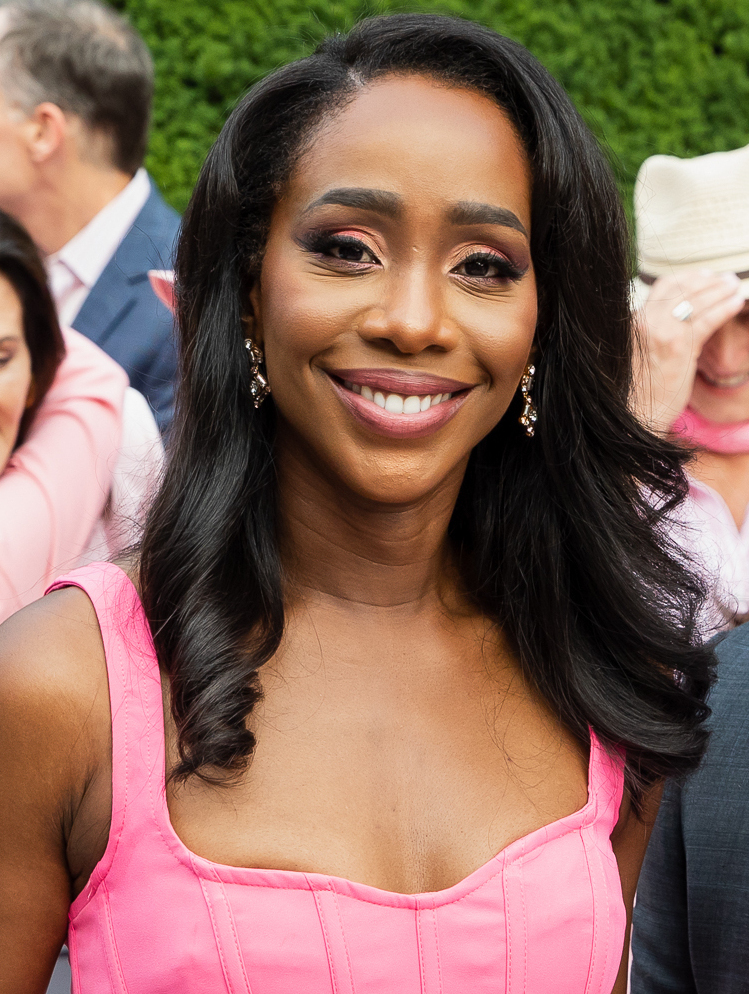
- Phillip in 2023
- Born: Abigail Daniella Phillip; November 25, 1988 (age 37); Alexandria, Virginia, U.S.
- Education: Harvard University (BA)
- Occupation: Political correspondent
- Spouse: Marcus Richardson (m. 2018)
- Children: 2

Abigail Daniella Phillip (born November 25, 1988) is an American news anchor. She anchors CNN NewsNight and CNN Saturday Morning Table for Five on CNN. She previously worked for Politico covering the Obama White House, The Washington Post as a national political reporter, and ABC News as a digital reporter for politics.

== Early life and education ==
Of Afro-Trinidadian descent, Abby Phillip was born in Alexandria, Virginia, to June Phillip, now a realtor, and Carlos Phillip, a teacher and later an educational psychologist. She has five siblings. When she was a child, the family briefly moved back to Trinidad and Tobago and returned to the U.S. when she was nine years old. The family moved to Germantown, Maryland, before settling in Bowie, Maryland.

Phillip attended Bowie High School. In 2010, she graduated from Harvard College with a Bachelor of Arts in government, after originally intending to study pre-med. At Harvard, Phillip wrote for The Harvard Crimson.

== Career ==
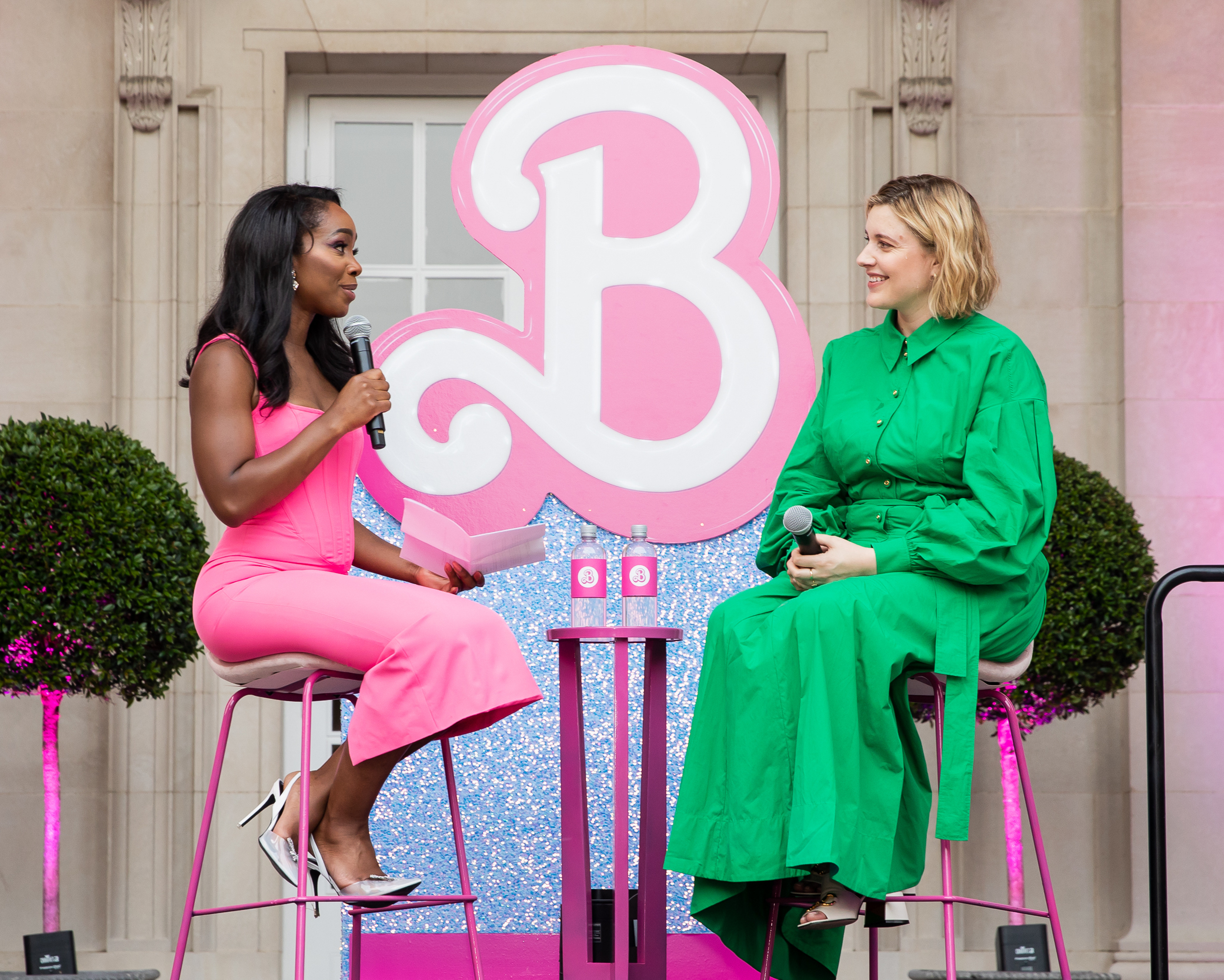
Phillip interviewing director Greta Gerwig at an event for Barbie in 2023

Phillip began her journalism career as a White House reporter and blogger for Politico, covering campaign finance issues and lobbying. Phillip joined CNN in 2017 and covered the Trump Administration. Before CNN, she worked at The Washington Post, where her roles included national political reporting and general assignments. She also worked at ABC News, where she was an ABC News Fellow and digital reporter in New York City, and has appeared as a guest on C-SPAN multiple times. She appears occasionally on Washington Week with Robert Costa on PBS. She signed with United Talent Agency in 2022.

Phillip co-moderated the seventh Democratic debate of the 2020 Democratic Party presidential primaries at Drake University on January 14, 2020. She was criticized for what some people said was unfair treatment of Bernie Sanders in moderating the debate.

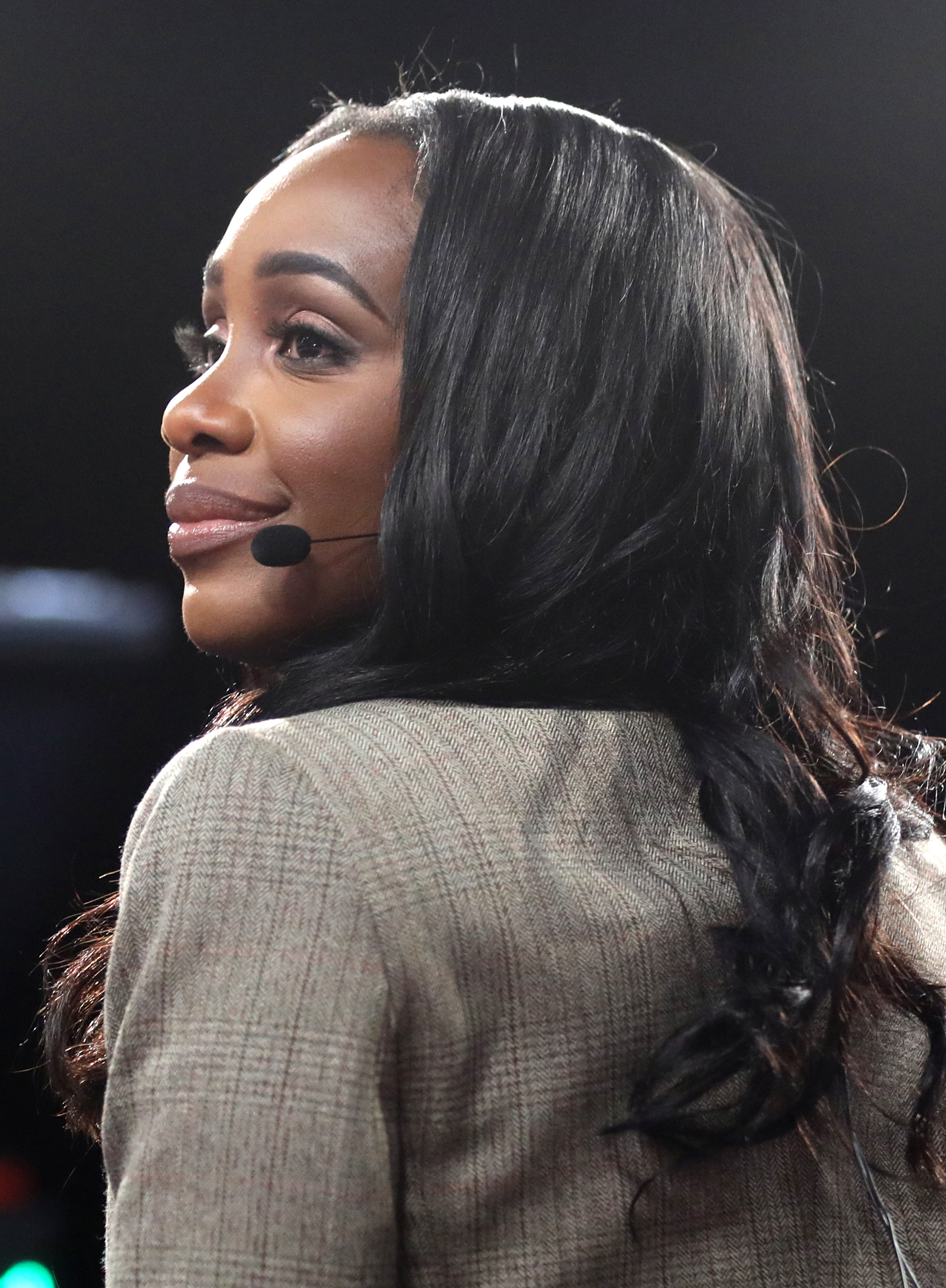
Phillip in the spin room at the 2024 Iowa Republican Presidential debate

In 2020, she landed a deal with Flatiron Books for The Dream Deferred, a book regarding Reverend Jesse Jackson's run to become the 1988 Democratic presidential nominee, originally scheduled for a 2022 release date. A Dream Deferred: Jesse Jackson and the Fight for Black Political Power was released on October 28, 2025.

On January 11, 2021, Phillip was announced as the new anchor starting January 24, of the weekend edition of Inside Politics, replacing John King on the Sunday morning version of the political talk show. (Dana Bash continues to host on weekdays.) The weekend show is called Inside Politics Sunday With Abby Phillip.

In August 2023, it was announced in a major weekday/weekend programming overhaul that Phillip would be named the permanent host of CNN's 10 p.m. ET hour with a new show titled CNN NewsNight with Abby Phillip. It was also announced that Manu Raju will now be anchoring Inside Politics on Sunday mornings.

== Personal life ==
Phillip lives in New York City with her husband, Marcus Richardson, a cybersecurity consultant. Phillip and Richardson were married at the Larz Anderson House in May 2018. The couple announced they were expecting their first child in 2021. She gave birth to the couple's first child, a daughter, in August 2021. Phillip is currently pregnant with their second child.She is an honorary member of Delta Sigma Theta sorority.

== Works ==
- Phillip, Abby (October 28, 2025). A Dream Deferred: Jesse Jackson and the Fight for Black Political Power. New York: Flatiron Books. ISBN 978-1-250-80631-4.
