= The Lead with Jake Tapper =

American news broadcast

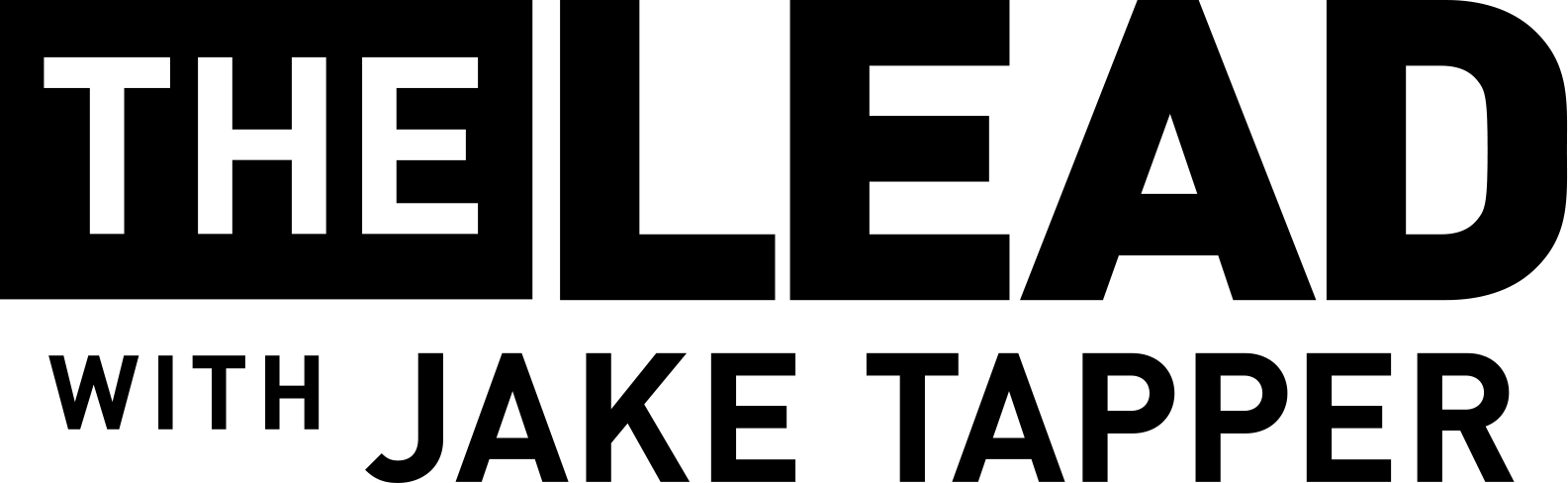
- Genre: News broadcast
- Country of origin: United States
- Original language: English

Production
- Executive producers: Federico Quadrani (2013–23); Reza Baktar (2023–present)
- Production locations: CNN Studio; Washington, D.C., U.S.
- Running time: 60 minutes (2013–2021); 120 minutes (2021–present)

Original release
- Network: CNN; CNN International; HBO Max
- Release: March 18, 2013 – present

The Lead with Jake Tapper is an American news broadcast hosted by news anchor Jake Tapper. The show has aired on CNN since March 18, 2013 in the network's pre-primetime timeslot.

The show currently airs weekdays live from 5:00 pm to 7:00 pm ET on CNN, and the 5:00 pm to 5:30 pm segment is also aired on CNN International.

The show contains a "lead" for different subjects. They are the National, Political, Money, Buried, Sports, World, Pop, Faith, Earth Matters, Tech, and Health leads.

== History ==
In December 2012, CNN hired Jake Tapper, then-senior White House correspondent for ABC News, as the network's chief Washington, D.C. correspondent and the anchor of an afternoon program, in an arraignment partially orchestrated by businessman Jeff Zucker, who became the president of CNN Worldwide in 2013. Tapper previously served as a host of Take Five, a political talk show that began airing in March 2001, ending its production shortly before the September 11 attacks. According to spokeswoman Jennifer Scoggins, Tapper's program would air for sixty minutes in The Situation Room with Wolf Blitzer's timeslot. The move occurred as CNN's ratings in 2012 were behind Fox News and MSNBC; In January 2013, LinkedIn job openings began appearing for Tapper. CNN announced The Lead with Jake Tapper in February 2013 with Today producer Federico Quadrani as the show's executive producer, forcing The Situation Room to start an hour later.

The Lead with Jake Tapper debuted on March 18, 2013. In 2013, the show was given a week of primetime re-run at 10 pm ET. That week, the Boston marathon terror attack caused this rebroadcast to be axed in favor of a live edition of Anderson Cooper 360°.

Following Piers Morgan's departure from CNN in March 2014, CNN President Jeff Zucker had various anchors fill the 9 pm ET slot as a test run. Among them was The Lead airing at 9 pm ET for the weeks of April 7 and April 14.

The Lead with Jake Tapper was also broadcast via tape-delay on CNN Philippines every Tuesday-Saturday for one hour at 11:00 am, local time from February 15 to July 23, 2016. From March 16 until September 5, 2015, the show aired at 4:00 pm. The Lead moved its morning telecast to 9:00 am but was truncated to 30 minutes until late January 2016 when it was moved to 8:30 for at least a month.

Before August 2016, The Lead with Jake Tapper was axed on CNN Philippines as part of program restructuring.

On September 10, 2018, the program started to be simulcast on CNN International.

In October 2020, the show aired for two hours from 3pm to 5pm ET. Brooke Baldwin's CNN Newsroom hour was removed for the month. The show went back to its usual air time in November after Baldwin returned.

In January 2021, CNN announced that the show would expand to two hours starting in April, taking over the former first hour of The Situation Room.

On January 23, 2025, it was announced that the show would move from its original 4:00 pm - 6:00 pm slot to 5:00 pm - 7:00 pm, as part of a major shakeup to the network's lineup. Kasie Hunt is expected to take over the 4:00 pm timeslot with a new show, called The Arena. The move is expected to take place in March 2025.

Preceded by The Arena with Kasie Hunt	CNN Weekday lineup 5:00 pm – 7:00 pm	Succeeded by Erin Burnett OutFront
