= Seymour Siwoff =

American statistician and businessman (1920–2019)

- Born: November 9, 1920; Brooklyn, New York City, U.S.
- Died: November 29, 2019 (aged 99); Manhattan, New York City, U.S.
- Education: St. John's University
- Spouse: Gertrude Schatzberg
- Family: Lela Swift Schwartz (sister)

Seymour Siwoff (November 9, 1920 – November 29, 2019) was an American statistician and businessman who was the president and chief executive of the Elias Sports Bureau from 1952 to 2019. He was named a finalist for the 2020 class of the Pro Football Hall of Fame as a contributor, however he was not elected.

== Biography ==
Siwoff was born in Brooklyn on November 1, 1920. His sister was television director and producer Lela Swift. In 1943, he graduated from St. John's University with a degree in accounting and then served during World War II in the 88th Infantry Division where he was hit by shrapnel in Italy. He worked as an accountant after the war and in 1948 took a position with the Elias Sports Bureau, the official statistician of the National League, where he had interned during college. In 1952, he purchased the Bureau from the widows of Al Munro Elias and Walter Bruce Elias, who founded the company in 1913. Under Siwoff, the company was known for providing more obscure facts (day/night games, performance against left/right-handed pitchers, home/away, and with runners in scoring position), foreshadowing the modern era's advanced statistics. In 1980, the Elias Sports Bureau became the official statistician of the American League, replacing the Sports Information Center. Siwoff expanded the company into providing statistical support to the NFL, NBA, WNBA, Major League Soccer, and various television and radio networks.

== Relationship with independent baseball researchers ==
Siwoff's stewardship of the Elias Sports Bureau brought him into contact with independent baseball researchers seeking access to historical statistics. In the 1980s, writer Bill James criticized the restricted availability of statistical records compiled by Elias. In 1992, researcher David Stephan encouraged Retrosheet founder David W. Smith to contact Siwoff. Smith and Siwoff began corresponding and discussing the preservation of historical baseball information, despite their different approaches to access to the data.

Their relationship was tested after Retrosheet researcher Ron Rakowski found evidence that Roger Maris had been incorrectly credited with a run batted in during the 1961 season. In 1995, Siwoff defended Elias's role in maintaining official statistics, while Smith distinguished Retrosheet's reconstruction of play-by-play records from the authority to revise official totals. The two continued discussing historical statistics despite this disagreement. The 1961 discrepancy was eventually reflected in a correction to the official record.

== Personal life ==
He was married to Gertrude Schatzberg (1921–2018); they had two children, Nancy Siwoff Gilston and Ronald Siwoff. He died at his home in Manhattan on November 29, 2019. His grandson, Joe Gilston, is owner and president of the Elias Sports Bureau.
