= Elias Sports Bureau =

US sports information and data company

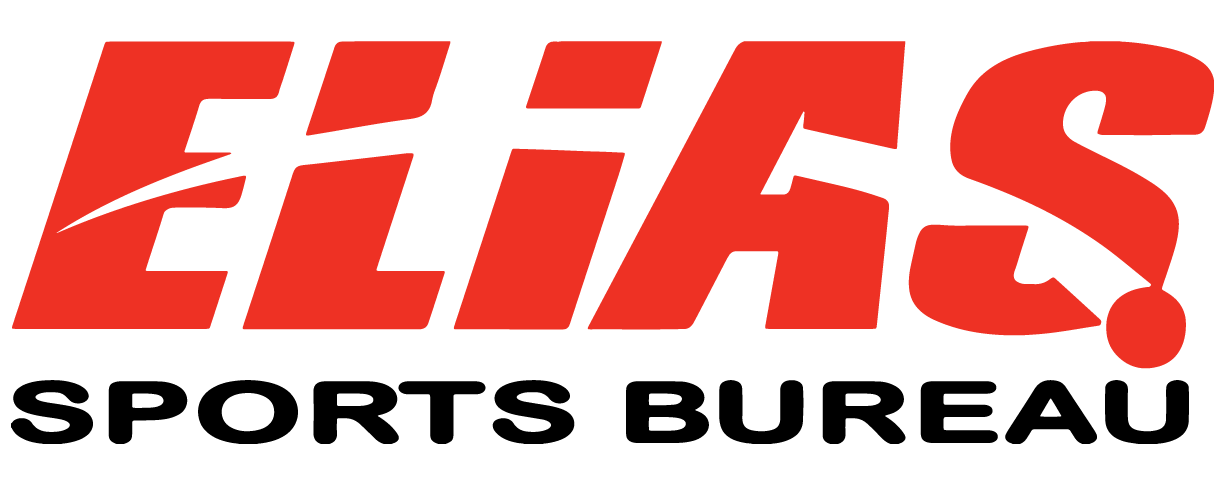
- Formerly: Al Munro Elias Baseball Bureau, Inc.
- Type: Private
- Industry: Sports technology and data
- Founded: 1913; 113 years ago
- Founders: Al Munro Elias & Walter Elias
- Headquarters: New York, New York, US
- Key people: Seymour Siwoff (deceased) Joseph Gilston (President)
- Website: https://www.esb.com/

The Elias Sports Bureau is an American privately held sports data company providing historical and current statistical information for the major professional sports leagues operating in the U.S. and Canada.

Founded in 1913, Elias is considered a pioneering firm in the field of sports recordkeeping and has served as the longtime official statistician for Major League Baseball (MLB), the National Basketball Association (NBA), and the National Football League (NFL).

Other notable clients include Major League Soccer (MLS), the WNBA, the NBA G League, and the PGA, and the company also serves as the official statistician for the WBC. In addition to its league clients, Elias also maintains relationships with major media clients including MLB Network, ESPN, The Sports Network, and CBSSports.com among others.

== History ==
=== Early Years, 1913–1952 ===
In 1913 Al Munro Elias and his brother Walter founded the Al Munro Elias Baseball Bureau, Inc. in New York City. The Bureau's methods of collection and presentation of statistics set the form and precedent for recording baseball information, and has influenced the universal collection and presentation of other sports’ leagues information ever since.

At first, the Munro brothers sold printed scorecards with baseball data directly to fans. The Bureau's popularity surged in 1916, when The New York Telegram daily newspaper began publishing the Bureau's weekly compilation of batting and pitching averages and league leaders. In 1916, Elias was named the official statistician of the National League and International League (the minor league baseball circuit), with the American League and other minor leagues following shortly thereafter.

In 1937, the Bureau took over the publication of Charley White's Record Book, also known as the “Little Red Book”, shortly after White's passing. The Little Red Book was an official source for major league records and statistics used by sportswriters, club and league officials, players, and sports fans.

Upon Al's passing in 1938, Walter Elias became President of the Al Munro Elias Baseball Bureau and began publishing The Pocket Cyclopedia of Major League Baseball, the successor to the Little Red Book. Lester Goodman assumed control of the Al Munro Elias Baseball Bureau after the death of Walter Elias in 1949. Goodman managed the business on behalf of the Elias brothers’ widows until his passing in 1952.

=== Ownership of Seymour Siwoff (1952-2019) ===
That same year, Seymour Siwoff, who had joined the company in 1937 as an intern while studying at St. John's University, purchased the Al Munro Elias Baseball Bureau from the Elias's widows. Siwoff renamed the company the Elias Sports Bureau to better fulfill his vision of incorporating all professional sports, and served as company president for 67 years. Under Siwoff, the company grew into the world's most trusted source for sports data.

Elias became the official statisticians of the NFL in 1961 and the NBA in 1970. Elias was later named the founding statistician for MLS and the WNBA in 1993 and 1997, respectively — both partnerships that endure to the present day. Elias also became official statistician of the NHL in 1997, although the league now complies its official statistics internally. Still today, Elias remains the leading sports statistics source for newspapers, magazines, websites, and sports broadcasters across the country.

Seymour was inducted into the New York Sports Hall of Fame in 1992 for Elias's contribution to the growth in popularity of sports through statistics and recordkeeping. Posthumously, Siwoff was named a finalist for the Pro Football Hall of Fame as a contributor in 2020, and was again named a semi-finalist in 2023 and 2024.

After stepping down in 2019, Siwoff turned the company over to his grandson, Joe Gilston, who continues to serve as president. Gilston's mission is to maintain the core company values of inclusion, accuracy, and accountability, while driving Elias's modernization efforts.

== Products and services ==
Elias receives daily game results directly from league offices. Elias scrubs the data, resolves any scoring issues, and archives the certified data for instant access. Official league data is then used to provide the following services:

- Official League Statisticians Elias researchers help league offices validate complex data, clarify complex scoring decisions, and ensure the accuracy and integrity of rules, statistics, and records based on precedent.
- Live Statistical Research Working in shifts around the clock, Elias researchers may be contacted instantly to provide context or confirmation of events on the field in real time to producers and broadcasters.
- Elias Editorial Notes Elias researchers provide comprehensive game and player notes based on official league statistics to broadcast partners for announcers and analysts to reference before, during, and after games.
- Elias Data Services are used by league offices, broadcast networks, and sports entertainment organizations, daily customized data streams on upcoming opponents and players of interest reveal trends, insights, and milestones based on historical performance. Elias, for instance, has digitized the records and box scores of games going as far back as 1876 for Major League Baseball.
- AccessElias This online service allows subscribing sports journalists and researchers to access official league statistics, study the Elias database, create search criteria, and analyze results.

== See also ==
- Stats Perform
- Sportradar US
