= Fareed Zakaria GPS =

- Genre: News; Talk
- Presented by: Fareed Zakaria
- Country of origin: United States
- No. of seasons: 15
- No. of episodes: 796

Production
- Production locations: 30 Hudson Yards; New York City
- Camera setup: Multi-camera
- Running time: 60 minutes

Original release
- Network: CNN
- Release: June 1, 2008 – present

Related
- Inside Politics; State of the Union

Fareed Zakaria GPS (Global Public Square) is a weekly international-affairs program on CNN and CNN International hosted by journalist and author Fareed Zakaria. The series features in-depth interviews and roundtable analysis, and airs in the United States on Sundays from 10:00–11:00 a.m. ET with a same-day replay from 1:00–2:00 p.m. ET. The program also publishes a weekly podcast edition. Segments and specials from the series have received industry recognition, including a Peabody Award (2011) and an Emmy nomination for Zakaria's interview with Chinese Premier Wen Jiabao.

== Broadcast and availability ==
In the United States, Fareed Zakaria GPS airs Sundays at 10:00 a.m. ET with a same-day replay at 1:00 p.m. ET on CNN. The program is also carried globally on CNN International; listings regularly show the series in the same Sunday window for CNNI audiences. An audio version of the show is released as a weekly podcast.

== Awards ==
Fareed Zakaria GPS: Interpretation and Commentary on Iran and the primetime special Restoring the American Dream - Fixing Education won a Peabody Award in 2011 “for covering global issues in a manner that shows their true importance for viewers throughout the world.” Zakaria's interview with Chinese Premier Wen Jiabao received an Emmy nomination for Outstanding Interview. CNN's transcript archive also documents the Fixing Education special's original broadcast in 2011.

Preceded by State of the Union	CNN Sunday lineup 10:00 am – 11:00 am 1:00 pm – 2:00 pm (replay)	Succeeded by Inside Politics
