= Late Edition with Wolf Blitzer =

American political news/talk program (1993–2009)

- Starring: Wolf Blitzer
- Country of origin: United States
- Original language: English

Production
- Running time: 120 minutes

Original release
- Network: CNN
- Release: October 3, 1993 – January 11, 2009

Late Edition with Wolf Blitzer is a Sunday talk show hosted by Wolf Blitzer on CNN and broadcast around the world by CNN International. The show's slogan was "The last word in Sunday talk" and comments made on the show were often featured in the following Monday's news headlines.

The show, launched on October 3, 1993, was moderated by Frank Sesno until January 11, 1998, and by Wolf Blitzer from January 18, 1998 to January 11, 2009.

The program aired at 11:00 AM ET and thus was the last of the Sunday talk shows to air in most East Coast markets, hence the name "Late Edition." (It was, however, the first to air on the West Coast, at 8:00 AM PT, since its other broadcast network competitors, including Fox News Sunday, aired on same-day tape delay on the West Coast at various times).

On December 8, 2008, CNN announced that the show would end the following month to make way for a new four-hour news block hosted by John King. The final Late Edition with Wolf Blitzer aired on January 11, 2009. The new newsblock, called State of the Union with John King, began airing on January 18, 2009.
