= Inside Politics =

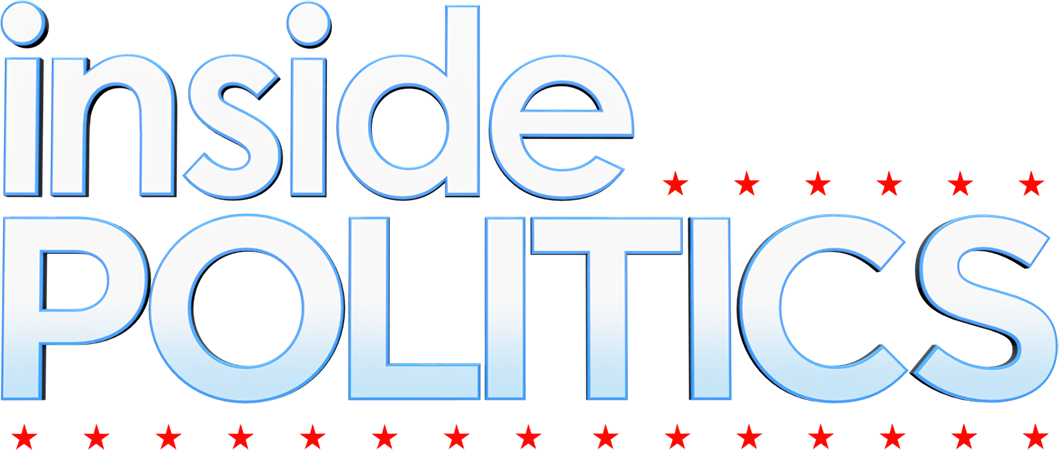
- Genre: News program
- Presented by: Weekdays; John King (2016–2023); Dana Bash (2023–present); Sunday; John King (2014–2021); Abby Phillip (2021–2023); Manu Raju (2023–present)
- Country of origin: United States

Production
- Production location: CNN Studios Washington, D.C.
- Running time: 60 minutes

Original release
- Network: CNN; CNN International
- Release: 1984 – 2005
- Release: 2014 – present

Related
- State of the Union; Fareed Zakaria GPS

Inside Politics is a political talk show, broadcast on CNN. Originally hosted by Catherine Crier and Bernard Shaw, and then Shaw and Judy Woodruff, the show ran from 1992 to 2005 before being cancelled. The program was revived in 2014 with John King as host. What was a Sunday morning talk show was then expanded to additional weekday broadcasts in 2016. Abby Phillip began hosting the Sunday edition in 2021, renamed as Inside Politics Sunday. In April 2023, CNN announced that Dana Bash would take over as permanent host while John King would depart the program to work on a new project. Also in 2023, it was announced that Manu Raju would take over from Abby Phillip on Inside Politics Sunday (as Phillip became host of the new weeknight program CNN NewsNight with Abby Phillip).

The show is broadcast weekdays noon to 1:00 pm ET on CNN and also Sunday 8:00 am to 9:00 am ET, with a replay at 11:00 am to noon ET on CNN and CNN International from CNN's studios in Washington, D.C..

== History ==
=== First incarnation ===
The show was originally broadcast for more than 10 years, and was shown on weekdays during the late afternoon. From 1993 to its cancellation in June 2005, Judy Woodruff was the co-host and then host. She did not renew her contract and joined the PBS NewsHour in 2006.

=== Second incarnation ===
In January 2014, the network announced that Inside Politics would return beginning Sunday, February 2, 2014, hosted by CNN's chief national correspondent, John King.

Following the success, the Sunday morning program was expanded into an hour, as well as additional weekday broadcast at noon ET, since September 26, 2016 (announced in August 2016). However, during certain times, the weekday edition of the program might be pre-empted by CNN Newsroom, the program that both precedes and succeeds Inside Politics. One of the major example were during the COVID-19 pandemic in 2020, where cable news ratings skyrocketed. Due to the need of more hard news coverage of the pandemic and lack of political campaign news during 2021, Inside Politics was often pre-empted by CNN Newsroom during that 12:00 p.m. hour. However, John King remained as the host for that block of CNN Newsroom. As the pandemic subsided, Inside Politics returned.

On June 12, 2023, Dana Bash replaced John King as the host of the daily show.

In January 2021, CNN announced that Abby Phillip would take over as the host of the weekend edition of the show. As for that change, the weekend program was rebranded as Inside Politics Sunday with Abby Phillip, while John King remained as host of the weekday edition until June 9, 2023; Dana Bash replaced King starting June 12, 2023.

In August 2023, it was announced that Manu Raju would helm the Sunday edition of the show, renamed Inside Politics Sunday with Manu Raju, following an overhaul of CNN's weekday/weekend programming that saw host Abby Phillip move to the 10 p.m. hour Monday-Friday.

Preceded by The Situation Room with Wolf Blitzer and Pamela Brown	Inside Politics (weekday); 12:00 pm – 1:00 pm	Succeeded by CNN News Central
Preceded by CNN This Morning	Inside Politics (Sunday); 11:00 am – 12:00 pm	Succeeded by State of the Union
