= List of Late Night with Seth Meyers episodes (2021) =

- No. of episodes: 155

Release
- Original network: NBC
- Original release: January 4 – December 16, 2021

Season chronology
- ← Previous; 2020 episodes Next → 2022 episodes

This is the list of episodes for Late Night with Seth Meyers in 2021.

== 2021 ==
=== January ===
No.	Original release date	Guest(s)	Musical/entertainment guest(s)
1083A	January 4, 2021	Amy Poehler	Burna Boy
A Closer Look
1084A	January 5, 2021	Chelsea Handler, Maika & Maritza Moulite	N/A
A Closer Look, R&B Singer from the 50s
1085A	January 6, 2021	Nicolle Wallace, Killer Mike	N/A
Seth acknowledges the 2021 storming of the United States Capitol at the top of the program
1086A	January 7, 2021	Bill Hader, Fran Lebowitz	N/A
A Closer Look
1087A	January 11, 2021	John Goodman, Amber Ruffin & Lacey Lamar	Future Islands
A Closer Look
1088A	January 12, 2021	Carey Mulligan, Leslie Jordan, Neil Gaiman	N/A
A Closer Look
1089A	January 13, 2021	Bobby Moynihan, Representative Andy Kim	N/A
A Closer Look
1090A	January 14, 2021	Anne Hathaway, Jane Levy	N/A
A Closer Look, Bad Sponsors
1091A	January 18, 2021	James Spader, Anthony Atamanuik	Julia Michaels
A Closer Look
1092A	January 19, 2021	Rachel Maddow, Billie Piper	N/A
A Closer Look
1093A	January 20, 2021	Chris Hayes	N/A
A Closer Look
1094A	January 21, 2021	Senator Bernie Sanders, Abby Phillip	N/A
A Closer Look, Ally Hord and Seth promote Heineken 0.0, Jokes Seth Can't Tell
1095A	January 25, 2021	Gillian Anderson, Kate Flannery	Bartees Strange
A Closer Look
1096A	January 26, 2021	Ted Danson, Brooks Wheelan, Ann Patchett	N/A
Ya Burnt
1097A	January 27, 2021	Stanley Tucci, Kate Berlant & Jacqueline Novak	N/A
A Closer Look
1098A	January 28, 2021	Desus & Mero, Ryan Shazier	N/A
A Closer Look

=== February ===
No.	Original release date	Guest(s)	Musical/entertainment guest(s)
1099A	February 1, 2021	Post Malone, Mary Steenburgen	N/A
A Closer Look
1100A	February 2, 2021	David Duchovny, Elizabeth Olsen, Wright Thompson	N/A
Hey!
1101A	February 3, 2021	Amy Schumer, Thomas Middleditch	N/A
A Closer Look
1102A	February 4, 2021	Michelle Pfeiffer, Joe Gatto, James "Murr" Murray, Sal Vulcano & Brian "Q" Quinn	N/A
A Closer Look
1103A	February 8, 2021	Bill Burr, Justin Hartley	N/A
A Closer Look
1104A	February 9, 2021	Casey Affleck, Anthony Atamanuik	N/A
A Closer Look
1105A	February 10, 2021	Allison Janney, Representative Cori Bush	N/A
A Closer Look, Back in My Day
1106A	February 11, 2021	Will Forte, Annie Mumolo	N/A
A Closer Look, Jeff Wright on financial stimulus
1107A	February 22, 2021	Secretary Pete Buttigieg	The Hold Steady
A Closer Look
1108A	February 23, 2021	Colin Jost, Harvey Guillen	N/A
Seth Explains Teen Slang, Andy Samberg checks in with Colin Jost during the interview
1109A	February 24, 2021	Ice-T, Tracey Wigfield	N/A
A Closer Look
1110A	February 25, 2021	David Spade, Jason Mantzoukas	N/A
A Closer Look, Crew Poetry: An Ode to Gene (final show of cameraman Gene Kelly)

=== March ===
No.	Original release date	Guest(s)	Musical/entertainment guest(s)
1111A	March 1, 2021	Kenan Thompson, Steven Yeun	Julien Baker
A Closer Look
1112A	March 2, 2021	Regina King, Kathryn Hahn, Chang-rae Lee	N/A
Amber Says What
1113A	March 3, 2021	Jake Tapper, Glynn Turman	N/A
A Closer Look
1114A	March 4, 2021	Ike Barinholtz, Harvey Guillen, Lilly Singh	N/A
A Closer Look
1115A	March 8, 2021	Eddie Murphy, Guy Fieri	N/A
Amber Ruffin recaps Meghan Markle's interview with Oprah Winfrey, A Closer Look, Guy Fieri sends Seth food from his delivery service
1116A	March 9, 2021	Don Johnson, Christina Hendricks	Fruit Bats
Amber Ruffin portrays Melania Trump
1117A	March 10, 2021	Bill Gates, Audra McDonald	N/A
A Closer Look
1118A	March 11, 2021	Amy Poehler, Phoebe Bridgers	N/A
A Closer Look
1119A	March 15, 2021	Jennifer Garner, Representative Jamie Raskin	Valerie June
Amber Ruffin recaps the Grammy Awards in one minute, A Closer Look
1120A	March 16, 2021	Joel McHale, Yara Shahidi, Mark Harris	N/A
Jokes Seth Can't Tell
1121A	March 17, 2021	Dr. Anthony Fauci, Diane von Furstenberg	N/A
A Closer Look
1122A	March 18, 2021	Sarah Silverman, Nico Hiraga	N/A
Seth acknowledges the 2021 Atlanta spa shootings and writer Karen Chee comments, A Closer Look
1123A	March 22, 2021	Ken Jeong, Eddie Izzard	Griff
A Closer Look
1124A	March 23, 2021	Megan Mullally & Nick Offerman, Sebastian Stan, Baratunde Thurston	N/A
Seth acknowledges the 2021 Boulder shooting, Ya Burnt
1125A	March 24, 2021	Kevin Bacon, Retta	N/A
A Closer Look
1126A	March 25, 2021	Sacha Baron Cohen, Viet Thanh Nguyen	N/A
A Closer Look

=== April ===
No.	Original release date	Guest(s)	Musical/entertainment guest(s)
1127A	April 12, 2021	John Oliver, Chloé Zhao	N/A
A Closer Look
1128A	April 13, 2021	Denis Leary, Cristin Milioti, Patrick Radden Keefe	N/A
Amber Says What
1129A	April 14, 2021	Gayle King, Mary Lynn Rajskub	Anderson East
A Closer Look
1130A	April 15, 2021	Rob Lowe, Domhnall & Brian Gleeson, Emerald Fennell	N/A
A Closer Look
1131A	April 19, 2021	Catherine Zeta-Jones, Wyatt Russell	N/A
A Closer Look
1132A	April 20, 2021	Hank Azaria, Brandi Carlile, Dulcé Sloan	N/A
The entire crew eats weed gummies, Hey!, Dina Gusovsky comments on weddings during the pandemic
1133A	April 21, 2021	Christine Baranski, Melissa Villaseñor	N/A
A Closer Look
1134A	April 22, 2021	Gwen Stefani, Adam McKay	Gwen Stefani
A Closer Look
1135A	April 26, 2021	Anna Kendrick, Phil Donahue & Marlo Thomas	N/A
Amber Ruffin recaps the 93rd Academy Awards in one minute, A Closer Look
1136A	April 27, 2021	Ed Helms, Michelle Buteau, Senator Jon Tester	N/A
The Kind of Story We Need Right Now
1137A	April 28, 2021	Elisabeth Moss, Ari Melber	Moon vs. Sun
A Closer Look
1138A	April 29, 2021	Justin Theroux, Leslie Jordan	Ashnikko featuring Princess Nokia
A Closer Look

=== May ===
No.	Original release date	Guest(s)	Musical/entertainment guest(s)
1139A	May 3, 2021	Michael Che, Richard Kind	N/A
Seth Tries to Think of Literally Anything More Pathetic, A Closer Look
1140A	May 4, 2021	Pete Davidson, Jodie Turner-Smith, George Saunders	N/A
COVID Keepers, Jodie Turner-Smith brings Seth a gift
1141A	May 5, 2021	Senator Amy Klobuchar, Robin Thede	Ryan Hurd featuring Maren Morris
A Closer Look
1142A	May 6, 2021	Dave Grohl, Ziwe	Foo Fighters
A Closer Look, Jeff Wright offers an inside look at the Derek Chauvin trial verdict
1143A	May 10, 2021	Tracee Ellis Ross, Paula Pell	N/A
Dammit, That's Really Funny, A Closer Look
1144A	May 11, 2021	Amy Adams, Stacey Abrams	Ashe
Ya Burnt
1145A	May 12, 2021	Aidy Bryant, Barry Jenkins	N/A
A Closer Look, Aidy Bryant takes questions from characters she is playing in the audience
1146A	May 13, 2021	Anthony Mackie, Jean Smart	N/A
A Closer Look
1147A	May 17, 2021	Julianna Margulies, Josh Duhamel	Alaina Castillo
A Closer Look
1148A	May 18, 2021	Nick Jonas, Sam Jay, Secretary Deb Haaland	N/A
Jokes Seth Can't Tell
1149A	May 19, 2021	Senator Bernie Sanders	N/A
A Closer Look, cue card guy Wally Feresten is interviewed when Action Bronson fails to show up
1150A	May 20, 2021	Rob McElhenney, Ryan O'Connell	N/A
A Closer Look, Leave Him Alone Guy
1151A	May 24, 2021	Ewan McGregor, Casey Wilson	N/A
A Closer Look
1152A	May 25, 2021	Jake Tapper, Nicole Byer, Paul W. Downs	N/A
New York Mayoral Candidate Ad
1153A	May 26, 2021	John Krasinski, Donny Deutsch	dodie
A Closer Look
1154A	May 27, 2021	Joel Edgerton, Edward-Isaac Dovere	N/A
A Closer Look

=== June ===
No.	Original release date	Guest(s)	Musical/entertainment guest(s)
1155A	June 7, 2021	Patrick Wilson, Quinta Brunson	N/A
A Closer Look
1156A	June 8, 2021	Joel McHale, Bill Cowher, Carmen Christopher	N/A
Amber Says What
1157A	June 9, 2021	Will Forte, Kareem Abdul-Jabbar	N/A
A Closer Look
1158A	June 10, 2021	David Harbour, Josh O'Connor	Garbage
A Closer Look
1159A	June 14, 2021	Kenan Thompson, Juno Temple	MARINA
Jenny Hagel reviews In the Heights, A Closer Look
1160A	June 15, 2021	Wendy Williams, Paul Rabil	N/A
Back in My Day, Paul Rabil and Seth do a lacrosse tutorial, The Conservative Perspective/The Progressive Perspective
1161A	June 16, 2021	Terry Crews, Ann-Margret	N/A
A Closer Look, Josh Meyers portrays Gavin Newsom
1162A	June 17, 2021	Peyton Manning, Bowen Yang, Edgar Wright	N/A
A Closer Look
1163A	June 21, 2021	Salma Hayek, Jacqueline Novak	N/A
A Closer Look
1164A	June 22, 2021	Graham Norton, Zosia Mamet, Brandon Taylor	N/A
The Four New Animals, Lark Kimble: Conversation Coach
1165A	June 23, 2021	Bill Clinton & James Patterson, Titus Welliver	Weezer
A Closer Look
1166A	June 24, 2021	John Cena, Kristen Schaal	N/A
A Closer Look

=== July ===
No.	Original release date	Guest(s)	Musical/entertainment guest(s)
1167A	July 12, 2021	Scarlett Johansson, Noah Syndergaard	N/A
A Closer Look
1168A	July 13, 2021	Amy Poehler, M. Night Shyamalan	N/A
Really!?! with Seth & Amy
1169A	July 14, 2021	Florence Pugh, Questlove	Walk the Moon
A Closer Look
1170A	July 15, 2021	Alan Cumming, Damian Lillard	N/A
A Closer Look
1171A	July 19, 2021	Shailene Woodley, Henry Winkler	N/A
A Closer Look
1172A	July 20, 2021	Kristin Chenoweth, Tim Robinson, Simon Rich	N/A
Ya Burnt
1173A	July 21, 2021	Lorde	Lorde
A Closer Look, Lorde and Seth go day drinking
1174A	July 22, 2021	Mindy Kaling, Jack Antonoff	Bleachers
A Closer Look

=== August ===
No.	Original release date	Guest(s)	Musical/entertainment guest(s)
1175A	August 9, 2021	Kristen Bell & Dax Shepard, John Stamos	N/A
A Closer Look
1176A	August 10, 2021	Joseph Gordon-Levitt, Kevin Smith	N/A
Amy Poehler shows up during the monologue, Amber and Jenny Report on the Olympics
1177A	August 11, 2021	Andy Samberg, Hannah Waddingham	Tom Odell
A Closer Look
1178A	August 12, 2021	Ethan Hawke, Jodie Comer	N/A
Getting to Know the Lambda Variant, A Closer Look
1179A	August 16, 2021	Ben Platt, Dana Bash	Ben Platt
A Closer Look
1180A	August 17, 2021	Jennifer Hudson, Brendan Hunt, Lior Raz	N/A
Amber Says What, Dina Gusovsky talks about Britney Spears
1181A	August 18, 2021	Connie Britton, Ms. Pat	Sleater Kinney
A Closer Look, Seth's opinions on the stock market
1182A	August 19, 2021	Cecily Strong, Patton Oswalt	N/A
A Closer Look
1183A	August 23, 2021	Sean Penn, Sharon Horgan	N/A
A Closer Look
1184A	August 24, 2021	Melissa McCarthy & Ben Falcone, J. B. Smoove, Taylor Tomlinson	N/A
Back in My Day, the crew had a desk party (advertisement for Heineken)
1185A	August 25, 2021	Michael Keaton, Teyonah Parris	Chris Stapleton
A Closer Look
1186A	August 26, 2021	Michael Shannon, Hannah Einbinder	N/A
A Closer Look, Michael Shannon plays guitar

=== September ===
No.	Original release date	Guest(s)	Musical/entertainment guest(s)
1187A	September 7, 2021	John Mulaney, Regina Hall	N/A
Hey!, Amber's Minute of Fury
1188A	September 8, 2021	Selena Gomez, Glenn Howerton	Walker Hayes
A Closer Look, Seth tries Selena Gomez's beauty line
1189A	September 9, 2021	Amanda Peet, Paula Pell	N/A
A Closer Look
1190A	September 13, 2021	Sarah Paulson, Machine Gun Kelly	N/A
A Closer Look
1191A	September 14, 2021	Kate Hudson, Jon Bernthal, Natasha Brown	N/A
Met Gala Outfit Names, Seth acknowledges the death of Norm Macdonald, Seth Explains Teen Slang
1192A	September 15, 2021	Nathan Lane, B. J. Novak	Nessa Barrett
A Closer Look
1193A	September 16, 2021	The cast of Brooklyn Nine-Nine	N/A
A Closer Look
1194A	September 20, 2021	Amy Adams, Lee Daniels	Girl in Red
A Closer Look
1195A	September 21, 2021	Bill Burr, Keith Morrison, Abby McEnany	N/A
A Message from California Governor Gavin Newsom (Josh Meyers portrays Newsom), Shot or Not, Keith Morrison hypes up the next night's guests
1196A	September 22, 2021	Secretary John Kerry, Jim Gaffigan	N/A
James Corden makes a special appearance at the top of the program for Climate Night, A Closer Look
1197A	September 23, 2021	Ike Barinholtz, Jenny Slate	N/A
A Closer Look
1198A	September 27, 2021	Billy Bob Thornton, Miriam Margolyes	N/A
A Closer Look
1199A	September 28, 2021	Ray Liotta, Natasia Demetriou, Spencer Ackerman	N/A
Jokes Seth Can't Tell, The Wrong Take
1200A	September 29, 2021	Demi Lovato, Neal Brennan	Audrey Nuna featuring Saba
A Closer Look
1201A	September 30, 2021	Colin Jost, Michael Gandolfini	N/A
A Closer Look

=== October ===
No.	Original release date	Guest(s)	Musical/entertainment guest(s)
1202A	October 4, 2021	Blake Griffin, David Chase	N/A
A Closer Look
1203A	October 5, 2021	Jason Momoa & Dave Bautista, Alessandro Nivola, Anthony Doerr	N/A
Surprise Inspection!
1204A	October 6, 2021	Blake Shelton, Brett Goldstein	Cuco
A Closer Look
1205A	October 7, 2021	Jason Sudeikis, Brendan Hunt & Joe Kelly	N/A
A Closer Look, Jenny Hagel Visits a Lesbian Bar
1206	October 11, 2021	Ron & Clint Howard, Secretary Hillary Clinton & Louise Penny	N/A
First show with studio audience and the 8G Band since the start of the COVID-19 pandemic, A Closer Look
1207	October 12, 2021	Senator Elizabeth Warren, Matthew Macfadyen, Ricky Velez	N/A
Amber Ruffin comments on Donald Trump's comments on religion
1208	October 13, 2021	Chris Hayes, Sarah Snook	N/A
A Closer Look
1209	October 14, 2021	James Spader	Tate McRae
A Closer Look
1210	October 25, 2021	Anderson Cooper, Cobie Smulders	N/A
A Closer Look
1211	October 26, 2021	Amanda Seyfried, Rebecca Ferguson	Caroline, or Change
Surprise Inspection!, Amber Ruffin discusses Halloween
1212	October 27, 2021	Beanie Feldstein, Norman Lear	Lady A
A Closer Look
1213	October 28, 2021	Olivia Munn, Roy Wood Jr., Jason Blum	N/A
What's Actually Left in Build Back Better, A Closer Look

=== November ===
No.	Original release date	Guest(s)	Musical/entertainment guest(s)
1214	November 1, 2021	Tracy Morgan, Colin Quinn	N/A
A Closer Look
1215	November 2, 2021	Willie Geist, Steve Schirripa & Michael Imperioli, Fortune Feimster	N/A
The Kind of Story We Need Right Now, Dina Gusovsky portrays Sheryl Sandberg
1216	November 3, 2021	Keri Russell, Joe Pera	Jake Wesley Rogers
Animal–Themed Terms PETA Would Like to See Changed, A Closer Look
1217	November 4, 2021	Kumail Nanjiani, Jonathan Majors	N/A
A Closer Look, Mike Scollins wants to get tickets for a Late Night with Seth Meyers taping for a friend in June
1218	November 8, 2021	Pete Davidson, Emily Ratajkowski	N/A
A Closer Look
1219	November 9, 2021	Sarah Silverman, Gary Gulman, Mark Ronson	N/A
Amber Says What
1220	November 10, 2021	Gayle King, David Copperfield	Aurora
A Closer Look
1221	November 11, 2021	Taylor Swift, Aisling Bea	N/A
A Closer Look
1222	November 15, 2021	Bill Murray, Dan Aykroyd & Ernie Hudson, Ellie Kemper	N/A
A Closer Look
1223	November 16, 2021	Aubrey Plaza, Peter Sarsgaard, Amor Towles	N/A
Ya Burnt, Todd Khan
1224	November 17, 2021	Benedict Cumberbatch, David Arquette	Latto
A Closer Look
1225	November 18, 2021	Paul Rudd, Jared Harris	N/A
A Closer Look
1226	November 22, 2021	Michael Che, Representative Adam Schiff	N/A
A Closer Look
1227	November 23, 2021	Lin-Manuel Miranda, Rachel Dratch	Mastodon
Back in My Day
1228	November 24, 2021	Andy Samberg, Jesse Plemons	N/A
A Closer Look, A Farthing Look
1229	November 25, 2021	The Meyers Family	N/A
Surprise Inspection!, Larry Meyers plugs his YouTube series

=== December ===
No.	Original release date	Guest(s)	Musical/entertainment guest(s)
1230	December 6, 2021	Javier Bardem, Kimberly Williams-Paisley & Ashley Williams	N/A
A Closer Look
1231	December 7, 2021	Halle Berry, Chris Kattan, Rutger Bregman	N/A
Jokes Seth Can't Tell
1232	December 8, 2021	Brian Cox, George Stephanopoulos	Wet Leg
A Closer Look
1233	December 9, 2021	Tom Holland, Anna Konkle & Maya Erskine	N/A
A Closer Look
1234	December 13, 2021	Patti LuPone, James Acaster	Joy Crookes
A Closer Look
1235	December 14, 2021	Will Forte, David Baddiel	Father John Misty
Getting to Know the Omicron Variant, Seth & Will Go Day Drinking
1236	December 15, 2021	Matthew McConaughey, Marisa Tomei	Turnstile
A Closer Look
1237	December 16, 2021	Priyanka Chopra Jonas, Kyle Mooney	N/A
A Closer Look
