= List of Late Night with Seth Meyers episodes (2020) =

- No. of episodes: 152 (and 1 special)

Release
- Original network: NBC
- Original release: January 6 – December 17, 2020

Season chronology
- ← Previous; 2019 episodes Next → 2021 episodes

This is the list of episodes for Late Night with Seth Meyers in 2020. From March 30–August 20, Meyers began filming at home editions due to the COVID-19 pandemic in the United States.

== 2020 ==
=== January ===
No.	Original release date	Guest(s)	Musical/entertainment guest(s)
931	January 6, 2020	Senator Elizabeth Warren, David Byrne	H.E.R.
A Closer Look
932	January 7, 2020	Rachel Maddow, J. B. Smoove, Chef Jean-Georges Vongerichten	N/A
Late Night with Seth Meyers Democratic Presidential Debate, J. B. Smoove leaves a message for Larry David
933	January 8, 2020	Tiffany Haddish, M. Night Shyamalan	SHAED
A Closer Look
934	January 9, 2020	Larry David	N/A
A Closer Look, Larry David reads a message from J. B. Smoove, What If Everyone Had a Larry David?, Amber Says What
935	January 13, 2020	Bobby Cannavale, Amber Tamblyn, Christian Siriano	N/A
A Closer Look
936	January 14, 2020	Will Smith, John Early	Michael Cruz Kayne
Seth Explains Teen Slang, Fred Armisen: Art Aficionado
937	January 15, 2020	Billy Porter, Senator Amy Klobuchar	N/A
A Closer Look, Fred Armisen: Art Aficionado
938	January 20, 2020	Michael Moore, June Diane Raphael	N/A
Amber Ruffin celebrates Martin Luther King Jr. Day, A Closer Look
939	January 21, 2020	Aidy Bryant, Congressman Eric Swalwell	N/A
Seth and the Jonas Brothers Go Day Drinking (with Josh Meyers & Jack McBrayer)
940	January 22, 2020	Gwyneth Paltrow, Terry Crews, Philip Rucker & Carol Leonnig	N/A
Jokes Seth Can't Tell, Ya Burnt
941	January 23, 2020	Eric McCormack, Lewis Black	Chelsea Cutler
A Closer Look, Bad Sponsors
942	January 27, 2020	Colin Quinn, Julia Garner	Jagged Little Pill
A Closer Look
943	January 28, 2020	Lester Holt, William Jackson Harper, Kevin Smith	N/A
Hey!, What Does Karen Know?, Kevin Smith writes script for Seth to read
944	January 29, 2020	Kristen Bell, Desus & Mero	Little Big Town
Ambernita Baker, Back in My Day, Diego
945	January 30, 2020	Leslie Jones, Max Greenfield, Taika Waititi	N/A
A Closer Look, Max Greenfield gives Seth a sketch, Taika Waititi gives Seth a sketch

=== February ===
No.	Original release date	Guest(s)	Musical/entertainment guest(s)
946	February 3, 2020	Fran Drescher, Dean-Charles Chapman, Paul Krugman	N/A
Jenny Hagel makes a public service announcement for women over 40, A Closer Look
947	February 4, 2020	Andy Samberg	N/A
Amber Says What, Hey!, Second Chance Theatre (Andy Samberg, Kenan Thompson, John Mulaney, Colin Jost)
948	February 5, 2020	Ewan McGregor, Rob McElhenney	Erin Jackson
A Closer Look
949	February 6, 2020	Elijah Wood, Ben Schwartz, Paul Yoon	N/A
A Closer Look
950	February 10, 2020	Claire Danes, Zach Woods, Governor Gavin Newsom	N/A
Karen Chee celebrates Parasite's Oscar wins, A Closer Look
951	February 11, 2020	RuPaul, Stacey Abrams, Maria Bamford	N/A
Late Night with Seth Meyers Democratic Presidential Debate, Ben Stern
952	February 12, 2020	Edie Falco, Adam Pally, Andrew Zimmern & José Andrés	N/A
A Closer Look
953	February 13, 2020	Julia Louis-Dreyfus & Will Ferrell, Nat Faxon & Jim Rash	Cam
A Closer Look
954	February 24, 2020	Jake Tapper, Jacqueline Novak	Caroline Rose
A Closer Look
955	February 25, 2020	Carson Daly, Juliette Lewis, Patrick Radden Keefe	N/A
Hey!, Late Night Casserole
956	February 26, 2020	Nick Jonas, Travis Kelce, Finesse Mitchell	N/A
One of My Writers Explains a Joke, A Closer Look
957	February 27, 2020	Elisabeth Moss, Richard E. Grant	Mt. Joy
A Closer Look

=== March ===
No.	Original release date	Guest(s)	Musical/entertainment guest(s)
958	March 2, 2020	Cecily Strong, Winston Duke	Surfaces
A Closer Look, Squatle
959	March 3, 2020	John Oliver, Elizabeth Debicki, Jenny Offill	N/A
Late Night with Seth Meyers Democratic Presidential Debate, Old Video Games
960	March 4, 2020	Ty Burrell, Susie Essman	N/A
A Closer Look, Late Night Dioramas
961	March 5, 2020	Representative Alexandria Ocasio-Cortez, James Taylor	James Taylor
Veggie Meat Commercial, A Closer Look
962	March 9, 2020	Nicolle Wallace, Keke Palmer, Daymond John	N/A
A Closer Look
963	March 10, 2020	Emily Ratajkowski, Cillian Murphy, David Simon	N/A
The Check In, Point Counterpoint, Emily Ratajkowski and Seth check their social media followers
964	March 11, 2020	Nick Offerman, Michael Mando	D Smoke featuring Davion Farris
A Closer Look
965A	March 30, 2020	Senator Bernie Sanders	N/A
A Closer Look, Boston Accent Trailer
966A	March 31, 2020	Senator Elizabeth Warren	N/A
Seth Explains Quarin–teen Slang, Amber Says What, Late Night Vault

=== April ===
No.	Original release date	Guest(s)	Musical/entertainment guest(s)
967A	April 1, 2020	Martha Stewart	N/A
A Closer Look, Fred Armisen: Art Aficionado
968A	April 2, 2020	Amy Poehler	N/A
A Closer Look, Really!?! with Seth & Amy (Amy Poehler)
969A	April 6, 2020	Tracy Morgan	N/A
A Closer Look, Who I Miss, COVID-19 PSA
970A	April 7, 2020	Senator Kamala Harris	N/A
One of My Writers Explains a Joke, The Kind of Story We Need Right Now, Late Night Vault, Who I Miss
971A	April 8, 2020	Jim Gaffigan	N/A
A Closer Look, Seth acknowledges the deaths of Hal Willner and John Prine from COVID-19
972A	April 9, 2020	Jane Fonda, Yamiche Alcindor	N/A
A Closer Look
973A	April 13, 2020	John Oliver	N/A
A Closer Look, Quarantine Easter Parade
974A	April 14, 2020	Billy Eichner	N/A
Late Night White House Press Briefing, Amber's Minute of Fury, Fred Armisen: Art Aficionado
975A	April 15, 2020	Chris Hayes	N/A
A Closer Look, What Does Karen Know?
976A	April 16, 2020	John Mulaney	N/A
A Closer Look
977A	April 27, 2020	Maya Rudolph	N/A
A Closer Look
978A	April 28, 2020	Will Forte, Representative Katie Porter	N/A
Hey!, Amber Says What
979A	April 29, 2020	Rosie O'Donnell	N/A
A Closer Look, Fred Armisen: Art Aficionado
980A	April 30, 2020	Governor Gavin Newsom, Retta	N/A
A Closer Look

=== May ===
No.	Original release date	Guest(s)	Musical/entertainment guest(s)
981A	May 4, 2020	Ricky Gervais	N/A
A Closer Look, Josh Meyers as Gavin Newsom, Who I Miss
982A	May 5, 2020	Nathan Lane, Lauren Lapkus	N/A
Hey!, Not Now!, Zoom Meeting
983A	May 6, 2020	Ice Cube, Sarah Kendzior	N/A
A Closer Look, Who I Miss
984A	May 7, 2020	Kelly Clarkson, Representative Ayanna Pressley	N/A
A Closer Look
985A	May 11, 2020	Tina Fey, C Pam Zhang	N/A
A Closer Look
986A	May 12, 2020	Paul Giamatti, Nicole Richie	N/A
COVID-19 PSA, The Check In
987A	May 13, 2020	Governor Andrew Cuomo, Glenn Close	N/A
A Closer Look
988A	May 14, 2020	Amy Schumer & Chris Fischer, Graham Norton	N/A
A Closer Look, Josh Meyers as Gavin Newsom
989A	May 18, 2020	Nick Kroll, Governor Gretchen Whitmer	N/A
A Closer Look
990A	May 19, 2020	Issa Rae, Tom Papa	N/A
A Closer Look, Impressions Nobody Asked For
991A	May 20, 2020	Kumail Nanjiani, Sharon Horgan	N/A
Karen Chee discusses Asian Pacific American Heritage Month
992A	May 21, 2020	Janelle Monáe, Patton Oswalt	N/A
A Closer Look

=== June ===
No.	Original release date	Guest(s)	Musical/entertainment guest(s)
993A	June 1, 2020	Michael Che	N/A
Seth acknowledges the murder of George Floyd and Amber Ruffin tells of her experience of racism as a teenager at the top of the program, A Closer Look
994A	June 2, 2020	Keisha Lance Bottoms, Leslie Jones	N/A
Amber Ruffin tells of her experience of racism at the top of the program, Seth acknowledges Blackout Tuesday, A Closer Look
995A	June 3, 2020	Amanda Peet, Ramy Youssef & Patrisse Cullors	Tim McGraw
Amber Ruffin tells of her experience of racism at the top of the program, Amber's Minute of Fury
996A	June 4, 2020	Christine Baranski, Taika Waititi	N/A
Amber Ruffin tells of her experience of racism at the top of the program, A Closer Look
997A	June 8, 2020	Terry Crews, Nicole Byer	N/A
A Closer Look
998A	June 9, 2020	Tiffany Haddish, Brad Paisley	Brad Paisley
The Kind of Story We Need Right Now
999A	June 10, 2020	Michael Moore, Bel Powley	N/A
A Closer Look, Seth calls Amber Ruffin
1000A	June 11, 2020	Regina King, Amber Ruffin	N/A
Seth celebrates 1,000 episodes and thanks the crew, A Closer Look, Josh Meyers impersonates Matthew McConaughey in message to 2020 graduates
1001A	June 15, 2020	Pete Davidson, Matthew Rhys	N/A
A Closer Look
1002A	June 16, 2020	Senator Bernie Sanders, Yvonne Orji	Black Pumas
Quarantine Love Album Commercial, David Martin
1003A	June 17, 2020	Hank Azaria, Josie Duffy Rice	N/A
A Closer Look
1004A	June 18, 2020	Wanda Sykes, Judd Apatow	N/A
Answers to Frequently Asked Juneteenth Questions, A Closer Look
1005A	June 22, 2020	Jason Sudeikis & Mike O'Brien	N/A
Ethan Hawke makes a surprise appearance, A Closer Look, Second Chance Theatre
1006A	June 23, 2020	Chelsea Handler, Andrew Rannells	Nasty C & T.I.
Ya Burnt
1007A	June 24, 2020	Mike Birbiglia, Regina Hall	N/A
A Closer Look, Jenny Hagel tells everyone the right way to wash hands
1008A	June 25, 2020	Rachel McAdams, John Early	N/A
A Closer Look

=== July ===
No.	Original release date	Guest(s)	Musical/entertainment guest(s)
1009A	July 13, 2020	Andy Samberg, Jalen Rose	N/A
A Closer Look
1010A	July 14, 2020	Demi Moore, Paul Scheer	KALEO
Dude, What Is This?, Jokes Seth Can't Tell
1011A	July 15, 2020	Charlize Theron, Senator Tammy Duckworth	N/A
A Closer Look
1012A	July 16, 2020	Martin Short, KiKi Layne	N/A
A Closer Look
1013A	July 20, 2020	Colin Jost, Cristin Milioti	N/A
A Closer Look
1014A	July 21, 2020	Chris Evans, Action Bronson	Elle King
Late Night White House Press Briefing, Josh Meyers as Gavin Newsom
1015A	July 22, 2020	Amy Sedaris, Joy Reid	N/A
A Closer Look, The People from Your Gym Reunion Special
1016A	July 23, 2020	Vice President Al Gore, Rachel Brosnahan	N/A
A Closer Look
1017A	July 27, 2020	Senator Kamala Harris, Pete Carroll	N/A
A Closer Look, Seth acknowledges the death of Regis Philbin
1018A	July 28, 2020	Cameron Diaz, Billy Porter	Jason Aldean
Amber Says What, The Check In
1019A	July 29, 2020	David Schwimmer, Robin Thede	N/A
A Closer Look, Fred Armisen: Art Aficionado
1020A	July 30, 2020	Sean Hayes, Dan Levy	N/A
A Closer Look, Weekly Pitch Meeting

=== August ===
No.	Original release date	Guest(s)	Musical/entertainment guest(s)
1021A	August 3, 2020	Sean Penn, Jane Curtin	N/A
A Closer Look
1022A	August 4, 2020	Jake Tapper, Matthew Macfadyen	Foster the People
Really!?! with Seth & The Sea Captain
1023A	August 5, 2020	Seth Rogen, Gillian Jacobs	N/A
A Closer Look
1024A	August 6, 2020	J. B. Smoove, Dana Bash, Kaitlan Collins & Kyung Lah	N/A
A Closer Look
1025A	August 10, 2020	Tracee Ellis Ross, Luke Bryan	Luke Bryan
A Closer Look
1026A	August 11, 2020	Jim Belushi, Sarah Snook, Yiyun Li	N/A
A Closer Look, Seth's Dad Talks to The Sea Captain
1027A	August 12, 2020	Jeff Goldblum, Annie Murphy, Sam Jay	N/A
Amber Ruffin comments on Donald Trump
1028A	August 13, 2020	Paula Pell & John Lutz, John Berman	N/A
A Closer Look
1029A	August 17, 2020	Jason Sudeikis, Robert Costa	N/A
A Closer Look
1030A	August 18, 2020	Russell Crowe, Patton Oswalt	The Lemon Twigs
Amber Ruffin comments on Donald Trump, Jeff Wright comments on Donald Trump banning TikTok
1031A	August 19, 2020	Sandra Oh, Gayle King	N/A
A Closer Look
1032A	August 20, 2020	Kenan Thompson, Busy Philipps	N/A
Seth reflects on bits he didn't get to do, A Closer Look, Seth thanks his crew and writing staff, viewers and friends for helping with the quarantine shows

=== September ===
No.	Original release date	Guest(s)	Musical/entertainment guest(s)
1033A	September 8, 2020	Jane Fonda, Jorma Taccone	Bones UK
First show back in studio, A Closer Look
1034A	September 9, 2020	John Cleese, Glenn Howerton	N/A
A Closer Look
1035A	September 10, 2020	Michael Cohen	Sheryl Crow
A Closer Look, Amber Ruffin comments on Donald Trump
1036A	September 14, 2020	Kelly Clarkson, Malcolm Jenkins, Michael S. Schmidt	N/A
A Closer Look
1037A	September 15, 2020	Wendy Williams, Blake Griffin	Yola
Late Night White House Press Briefing, Laugh Track
1038A	September 16, 2020	Cynthia Nixon, Michael Stipe, Larry Wilmore	N/A
A Closer Look
1039A	September 17, 2020	Stacey Abrams, David Byrne	N/A
A Closer Look, NFL Player
1040A	September 21, 2020	Elizabeth Banks, Neil deGrasse Tyson, Brendan Hunt	N/A
A Closer Look, Seth promotes HeadCount.org
1041A	September 22, 2020	Keith Urban, Rachel Dratch	Keith Urban
Ways to Delay a Confirmation Vote, Amber Says What, Restaurant Reopening Commercial
1042A	September 23, 2020	Sarah Paulson, H. Jon Benjamin	N/A
Other Mail–In Voting Excuses, A Closer Look
1043A	September 24, 2020	Alicia Vikander, Maya Erskine & Anna Konkle	N/A
A Closer Look, Jeff Wright
1044A	September 28, 2020	Colin Quinn, Kim Cattrall	Jeff Rosenstock
A Closer Look
1045A	September 29, 2020	Sarah Silverman, Lili Reinhart	Phoebe Bridgers
Getting to Know Amy Coney Barrett, Ya Burnt, A Recently Disturbed Mummy (Andy Samberg)
1046A	September 30, 2020	Taylor Schilling, Brian Stelter	N/A
A Closer Look, Taylor Schilling's dog crashes the interview

=== October ===
No.	Original release date	Guest(s)	Musical/entertainment guest(s)
1047A	October 1, 2020	Cecily Strong, David Wright, Miranda July	N/A
A Closer Look
1048A	October 5, 2020	Jessica Chastain, John Slattery	N/A
A Closer Look, The Wright Thing with Jeff Wright, debut of trailer for The 355
1049A	October 6, 2020	Timothy Olyphant, Bob Woodward	BENEE
A Closer Look
1050A	October 7, 2020	America Ferrera, Ina Garten, David Remnick	N/A
What Does Karen Know?
Special	October 8, 2020	N/A	N/A
A Closer Look Primetime Special
1051A	October 8, 2020	Jim Parsons, Amber Ruffin, Yaa Gyasi	N/A
October Surprisopoolooza!, Hey!
1052A	October 19, 2020	Senator Amy Klobuchar, Ego Nwodim	N/A
A Closer Look
1053A	October 20, 2020	Adam Sandler, Jason Alexander	N/A
Back in My Day, The Wrong Take
1054A	October 21, 2020	Senator Cory Booker, Yahya Abdul-Mateen II	N/A
A Closer Look
1055A	October 22, 2020	Michael Keaton, HAIM	HAIM
A Closer Look
1056A	October 26, 2020	Gwen Stefani, Giancarlo Esposito	N/A
A Closer Look, Amber Ruffin comments on various rappers' support of Donald Trump
1057A	October 27, 2020	Natalie Portman, Cindy McCain	N/A
The Kind of Story We Need Right Now, Jokes Seth Can't Tell
1058A	October 28, 2020	Bette Midler, Bryan Washington	N/A
A Closer Look, Jenny Hagel comments on Pope Francis
1059A	October 29, 2020	Senator Bernie Sanders, Shepard Smith	Sleaford Mods
Fake Melania Trump, A Closer Look

=== November ===
No.	Original release date	Guest(s)	Musical/entertainment guest(s)
1060A	November 2, 2020	John Mulaney, Kristen Welker	Tracy Chapman
A Closer Look
1061A	November 4, 2020	Leslie Jones	N/A
A Closer Look
1062A	November 5, 2020	Chris Hayes, David Sedaris	N/A
A Closer Look
1063A	November 9, 2020	John Legend, Sarah Cooper	John Legend
A Closer Look
1064A	November 10, 2020	Demi Lovato, Édgar Ramírez, Ta-Nehisi Coates	N/A
Jeff Wright is leaving the country, Seth Explains Teen Slang, Lil Doof
1065A	November 11, 2020	Ethan Hawke, Lewis Black	N/A
A Closer Look, Lutz Has a Green-screen at Home
1066A	November 12, 2020	Dan Aykroyd, Anya Taylor-Joy	N/A
A Closer Look, John Mulaney talks about the deceased
1067A	November 16, 2020	Kaley Cuoco, Cazzie David	N/A
One of My Writers Explains a Joke, A Closer Look, Dina Gusovsky is jealous of Kamala Harris
1068A	November 17, 2020	Hugh Laurie, Rachel Bloom	LP
Amber Says What, Rachel Bloom's husband crashes the interview, Mike Scollins talks about wearing a tank top to a Zoom meeting
1069A	November 18, 2020	Hugh Grant, Emily Spivey	N/A
A Closer Look
1070A	November 19, 2020	Michael Moore, Rich Eisen	N/A
A Closer Look
1071A	November 23, 2020	Mandy Moore, Jeff Tweedy	Jeff Tweedy
A Closer Look
1072A	November 24, 2020	Amy Adams, Adam Davidson	N/A
Transition Priorities, Royal Watch: News from the Real-Life Crown (appearance by John Mulaney)
1073A	November 25, 2020	John Oliver, Joe Buck	N/A
A Closer Look, Josh Meyers gives Seth a Heineken gift
1074A	November 26, 2020	The Meyers Family	Kurt Vile
The Kind of Story We Need Right Now, Ya Burnt: Meyers Family Edition, A Thanksgiving Message from The Sea Captain

=== December ===
No.	Original release date	Guest(s)	Musical/entertainment guest(s)
1075A	December 7, 2020	Nick Kroll, Jeremy O. Harris	Sam Hunt
A Closer Look
1076A	December 8, 2020	Jimmy Fallon, Joe Manganiello	N/A
The Wright Thing with Jeff Wright, Popsicle Schtick
1077A	December 9, 2020	Aubrey Plaza, Natalie Palamides	N/A
Vaccine Distribution: Bottom of the List, A Closer Look, Jennifer Hollinsworth & Malcolm Briggs
1078A	December 10, 2020	Blake Shelton, Jenny Slate	My Morning Jacket
A Closer Look
1079A	December 14, 2020	The Chicks, Jamie Demetriou	Christina Aguilera
Smart Joke Alert, A Closer Look
1080A	December 15, 2020	Amanda Seyfried, Craig Robinson, Mehdi Hasan	N/A
Hey!, A Guy Who Lives on Twitter
1081A	December 16, 2020	Stacey Abrams, Holland Taylor	N/A
The Sea Captain, A Closer Look, Amber Ruffin performed a holiday song about 2020
1082A	December 17, 2020	Kristen Wiig, Carrie Underwood	Carrie Underwood
A Closer Look, Kristen Wiig quizzes Seth on difference between British Vs. US words
