= List of Late Night with Seth Meyers episodes (2019) =

- No. of episodes: 154

Release
- Original network: NBC

Season chronology
- ← Previous; 2018 episodes Next → 2020 episodes

This is the list of episodes for Late Night with Seth Meyers in 2019.

== 2019 ==
=== January ===
No.	Original release date	Guest(s)	Musical/entertainment guest(s)
777	January 7, 2019	Chris Hayes, Neal Brennan	Donna Missal
A Closer Look
778	January 8, 2019	Neil Patrick Harris	Alessia Cara
Jokes Seth Can't Tell, Neil Patrick Harris and Seth play cards, Bad Sponsors
779	January 9, 2019	Andy Samberg, Josh Hutcherson	N/A
A Closer Look, Andy Samberg reads discarded jokes, Seth & Andy Clear the Air
780	January 10, 2019	John Goodman, Julia Garner, Geoffrey Zakarian	N/A
A Closer Look
781	January 14, 2019	Allison Williams, Ryan Eggold, Sam Richardson	N/A
Jimmy Fallon shares a sneak peek of the Tonight Show episode from Puerto Rico, A Closer Look
782	January 15, 2019	James McAvoy, D'Arcy Carden	Janelle James
Late Night White House Press Conference, The Check In
783	January 16, 2019	Jim Gaffigan, Frankie Shaw	A Boogie wit da Hoodie
Brexit Commercial, A Closer Look
784	January 17, 2019	Michael Strahan, Penn & Teller	Guster
A Closer Look, Back in My Day, Seth plays poker with Teller
785	January 21, 2019	Colin Jost & Michael Che, Andrea Savage	Death Cab for Cutie
The Tiny Voice in the Back of Donald Trump's Head, A Closer Look
786	January 22, 2019	Connie Britton, Dave Franco, Chris Kelly & Sarah Schneider	N/A
The Tiny Voice in the Back of Donald Trump's Head, Amber Says What, Ya Burnt
787	January 23, 2019	Anne Hathaway, Senator Sherrod Brown, Michaela Coel	N/A
The Tiny Voice in the Back of Donald Trump's Head, A Closer Look
788	January 24, 2019	Ellie Kemper, Claire McCaskill	Young the Giant
The Tiny Voice in the Back of Donald Trump's Head, A Closer Look, The Kind of Story We Need Right Now
789	January 28, 2019	Alan Cumming, Jemele Hill, Maia Mitchell & Cierra Ramirez	N/A
A Closer Look
790	January 29, 2019	Rosie O'Donnell, Nicolle Wallace	DaniLeigh
Tweets the Pope Didn't Send, Point Counterpoint (appearance by Chris Hayes)
791	January 30, 2019	Megan Mullally, Killer Mike, Claire Adam	N/A
A Closer Look
792	January 31, 2019	Michael Moore, Busy Philipps	Conan Gray
A Closer Look

=== February ===
No.	Original release date	Guest(s)	Musical/entertainment guest(s)
793	February 4, 2019	Jake Tapper, Justina Machado, Marlon James	N/A
A Closer Look
794	February 5, 2019	Taylor Schilling, Ana Navarro	N/A
Special live episode following the State of the Union Address, A Closer Look, Jokes Seth Can't Tell
795	February 6, 2019	Ice-T, Paul Schrader	N/A
Seth & Ina Go Day Drinking, US Senators Announce Presidential Campaigns
796	February 7, 2019	J. J. Watt, Tim Meadows, Anna Konkle & Maya Erskine	N/A
A Closer Look
797	February 11, 2019	Debra Messing, Henry Louis Gates Jr.	The Prom
A Closer Look, Fred Judges a Book by Its Cover
798	February 12, 2019	Don Cheadle, Jake Johnson	Kurt Vile
Seth Explains Teen Slang, Fred Judges a Book by Its Cover, New Studies
799	February 13, 2019	Will Forte	N/A
A Closer Look, Fred Judges a Book by Its Cover, Second Chance Theatre (with Jason Sudeikis)
800	February 14, 2019	John Mulaney, Stacey Abrams	N/A
A Closer Look, Fred Judges a Book by Its Cover, Richard Kind comes out and performed a Stephen Sondheim-esque song
801	February 18, 2019	John Oliver, Tatiana Maslany	St. Paul and The Broken Bones
A Closer Look
802	February 19, 2019	America Ferrera, Desus & Mero	Lauren Alaina
One of My Writers Explains a Joke, Ya Burnt, The American Diversity Council
803	February 20, 2019	Natasha Lyonne, Donny Deutsch, Drew Tarver & Heléne Yorke	N/A
A Closer Look
804	February 21, 2019	James Spader, Glenda Jackson, Brad Leone	N/A
White Savior Trailer, A Closer Look
805	February 25, 2019	John Legend, April Ryan, Geraldine Viswanathan	N/A
Amber Says What, A Closer Look
806	February 26, 2019	Patton Oswalt, Heidi Gardner	Elle King
The Check In, Seth mispronounces the word biopic
807	February 27, 2019	Tyler Perry, Christina Hendricks	Astrid S
A Closer Look
808	February 28, 2019	Senator Bernie Sanders, J. K. Simmons	N/A
A Closer Look

=== March ===
No.	Original release date	Guest(s)	Musical/entertainment guest(s)
809	March 11, 2019	Jesse Eisenberg, Paula Pell	Dan + Shay
A Closer Look, Paula Pell does a new character
810	March 12, 2019	Paul Giamatti, Jessica Walter, John Hickenlooper	N/A
Late Night White House Press Conference, Old Video Games
811	March 13, 2019	Ricky Gervais, Asia Kate Dillon	James Bay
A Closer Look, YouTube subCommunities
812	March 14, 2019	Sharon Horgan & Rob Delaney, Stephanie Schriock	N/A
One of My Writers Explains Their Joke, A Closer Look
813	March 18, 2019	Oscar Isaac, Winston Duke	Emily King
A Closer Look, Fred Judges a Book by Its Cover
814	March 19, 2019	Jordan Peele, Phoebe Waller-Bridge, Action Bronson	N/A
Couple Things, Fred Judges a Book by Its Cover, Action Bronson brings Seth Italian ice
815	March 20, 2019	Amy Schumer, Natalie Morales	PUP
Getting to Know Pete Buttigieg, A Closer Look, Fred Judges a Book by Its Cover
816	March 21, 2019	Representative Alexandria Ocasio-Cortez, Andrew Rannells, Carla Lalli Music	N/A
A Closer Look

=== April ===
No.	Original release date	Guest(s)	Musical/entertainment guest(s)
817	April 1, 2019	Steve Martin, Susan Kelechi Watson	N/A
A Closer Look, Steve Martin gets the Premium Guest experience
818	April 2, 2019	Issa Rae, Timothy Simons, Rachael Ray	N/A
The Kind Of Story We Need Right Now, Jokes Seth Can't Tell
819	April 3, 2019	Chris Hayes, Rich Eisen	The Strumbellas
A Closer Look
820	April 4, 2019	Senator Kamala Harris, Henry Winkler, Conleth Hill	N/A
A Closer Look
821	April 8, 2019	Kit Harington, Chelsea Clinton	Marina
A Closer Look, Fred Judges a Book by Its Cover
822	April 9, 2019	Timothy Olyphant, Diane von Fürstenberg	N/A
Ya Burnt, Fred Judges a Book by Its Cover, Timothy Olyphant Is a Record-Setting Late Night Guest, Bad Sponsors
823	April 10, 2019	Sam Rockwell, Jodie Comer	Kiana Ledé
A Closer Look, Fred Judges a Book by Its Cover, Back in My Day
824	April 11, 2019	Adam Driver, Regina Hall, Anthony Carrigan	N/A
A Closer Look
825	April 15, 2019	Tracy Morgan, Willie Geist	Ingrid Andress
A Closer Look, Fred Judges a Book by Its Cover
826	April 16, 2019	Julia Louis-Dreyfus, Mark Hamill, Ashley Longshore	N/A
Amber Says What, Fred Judges a Book by Its Cover
827	April 17, 2019	Hank Azaria, Melissa Fumero, Brandon Maxwell	N/A
A Closer Look, Fred Judges a Book by Its Cover
828	April 18, 2019	Amy Sedaris, Pete Buttigieg	Toro y Moi
A Closer Look, Game of Jones (with Leslie Jones), The Milky Way
829	April 29, 2019	Glenn Howerton, Desi Lydic	Craig Finn
A Closer Look, Eric Hoinz & Chris Mantz
830	April 30, 2019	Seth Rogen, Jared Harris, Lyric Lewis	N/A
One of My Writers Explains a Joke, Seth Explains Teen Slang

=== May ===
No.	Original release date	Guest(s)	Musical/entertainment guest(s)
831	May 1, 2019	Charlize Theron, Tim Robinson	Judah & the Lion
A Closer Look
832	May 2, 2019	Adam Sandler, Congressman Will Hurd	N/A
A Closer Look
833	May 6, 2019	Keri Russell, Ana Gasteyer, Alex Brightman	N/A
A Closer Look
834	May 7, 2019	Rhea Perlman, Meghan McCain	A R I Z O N A
Hey!, Late Night White House Press Conference
835	May 8, 2019	Lena Dunham, Ian McShane	N/A
A Closer Look, Squattle
836	May 9, 2019	Amy Poehler, Dr. Ruth Westheimer	N/A
Hallmark Dog Mother's Day Cards, A Closer Look
837	May 13, 2019	Anthony Anderson, Jason Mantzoukas, Representative Rashida Tlaib	N/A
A Closer Look
838	May 14, 2019	Bill Hader, Kathryn Newton	N/A
Hey!, Ya Burnt, Seth & Bill Clear the Air, Keith Reid
839	May 15, 2019	Colin Quinn, Margo Martindale	Pkew pkew pkew
Amber Ruffin talks about the Alabama abortion law, A Closer Look
840	May 16, 2019	Aidy Bryant, John Waters, Senator Michael Bennet	N/A
A Closer Look
841	May 20, 2019	Jeff Daniels, Logan Browning, Ann Beattie	N/A
A Closer Look
842	May 21, 2019	Bryan Cranston, Eric Stonestreet	Chromeo
The Kind of Story We Need Right Now, Late Night Casserole
843	May 22, 2019	John Lithgow, Beanie Feldstein, Julian Castro	N/A
A Closer Look
844	May 23, 2019	Olivia Wilde, Christopher Abbott	Janine Brito
Game of Jones, Karen Chee celebrates Asian Pacific American Heritage Month

=== June ===
No.	Original release date	Guest(s)	Musical/entertainment guest(s)
845	June 10, 2019	Steve Buscemi, Zosia Mamet	Noah Kahan
Other Award Groups, A Closer Look, Fred Armisen: Art Aficionado
846	June 11, 2019	Rachel Maddow, Julio Torres, Ana Fabrega & Fred Armisen	N/A
Late Night White House Press Conference, Fred Armisen: Art Aficionado, Charles Reinke
847	June 12, 2019	Jim Gaffigan, Linda Cardellini, Ocean Vuong	N/A
A Closer Look, Fred Armisen: Art Aficionado
848	June 13, 2019	Andy Cohen, Senator Amy Klobuchar	Regina Spektor
What Does Karen Know?, A Closer Look
849	June 17, 2019	Kevin Bacon, Cobie Smulders, Jordan Klepper	N/A
A Closer Look, Kevin Bacon shaves off his mustache
850	June 18, 2019	Eva Longoria, Jacki Weaver, Michael Torpey	N/A
Seth Explains Teen Slang, Seth's opinions on gyms
851	June 20, 2019	Aubrey Plaza, Louie Anderson	N/A
A Closer Look, Seth & Rihanna Go Day Drinking
852	June 24, 2019	Olivia Munn, Ramy Youssef	Matt Maeson
The Tiny Voice in the Back of Donald Trump's Head, A Closer Look
853	June 25, 2019	Tom Holland, Jenny Slate	SOAK
Hey!, Back in My Day, The Tiny Voice in the Back of Donald Trump's Head, Dina Gusovsky comments on snowplow parenting
854	June 26, 2019	Terry Crews, Anthony Jeselnik	N/A
Live broadcast, A Closer Look, Jokes Seth Can't Tell
855	June 27, 2019	Kate McKinnon, Representative Pramila Jayapal	N/A
Live broadcast, A Closer Look, The Tiny Voice in the Back of Donald Trump's Head

=== July ===
No.	Original release date	Guest(s)	Musical/entertainment guest(s)
856	July 15, 2019	Laura Dern, Megan Rapinoe	Catherine Cohen
Jenny Hagel recaps the 2019 FIFA Women's World Cup, A Closer Look, Seth acknowledges death of Late Night crew member
857	July 16, 2019	Dax Shepard, Nicolle Wallace	Weyes Blood
One of My Writers Explains a Joke, Late Night with Seth Meyers Democratic Presidential Debate, What Does Karen Know?
858	July 17, 2019	Jesse Eisenberg, Emily Deschanel	Kae Tempest
A Closer Look, New Campaign Slogans
859	July 18, 2019	John Leguizamo, Representative Hakeem Jeffries	Jonas Brothers
A Closer Look, The Go Back to Your Country Girls
860	July 22, 2019	Senator Cory Booker, Fred Savage	Kane Brown
A Closer Look, Fred Armisen: Art Aficionado
861	July 23, 2019	Beto O'Rourke, Retta, Hunter Schafer	N/A
The Kind of Story We Need Right Now, Fred Armisen: Art Aficionado
862	July 24, 2019	Billy Eichner, Danielle Brooks	Hobo Johnson
A Closer Look, Fred Armisen: Art Aficionado
863	July 25, 2019	Michael Moore, 2 Chainz, Brian Michael Bendis	N/A
A Closer Look, Fred Armisen: Art Aficionado, 2 Chainz and Seth have tequila
864	July 29, 2019	John Oliver, CC Sabathia	Mini Mansions
Jenny Hagel recaps the corruption of Puerto Rico, A Closer Look
865	July 30, 2019	Wanda Sykes, Jose Antonio Vargas	N/A
Live broadcast, A Closer Look, Amber Says What
866	July 31, 2019	Chris Hayes, Charlamagne tha God	N/A
Live broadcast, A Closer Look

=== August ===
No.	Original release date	Guest(s)	Musical/entertainment guest(s)
867	August 1, 2019	Chris Cuomo, Governor Larry Hogan, Rhianne Barreto	N/A
Best Case Worst Case, Jokes Seth Can't Tell
868	August 5, 2019	Milo Ventimiglia, Geena Davis	Ex Hex
Seth addresses the 2019 El Paso and Dayton mass shootings (A Closer Look), Two Millennials
869	August 6, 2019	Michelle Williams, Noel Gallagher, Tommy Orange	N/A
Hey!, Late Night with Seth Meyers Democratic Presidential Debate
870	August 7, 2019	Amanda Seyfried, Sandra Bernhard, Storm Reid	N/A
A Closer Look
871	August 8, 2019	Will Ferrell (in character as Ron Burgundy), Billy Crudup, Robin Thede	N/A
A Closer Look, Ron Burgundy does stand-up comedy
872	August 12, 2019	Kathy Griffin, George Takei, Jacqueline Novak	N/A
A Closer Look
873	August 13, 2019	Danny McBride, Yvonne Strahovski, Marianne Williamson	N/A
The Check In, Chip Friedlin
874	August 14, 2019	Michael Che, Alison Brie	Torche
A Closer Look
875	August 15, 2019	Jake Tapper, Mj Rodriguez	Nate Smith
A Closer Look, Popsicle Schtick

=== September ===
No.	Original release date	Guest(s)	Musical/entertainment guest(s)
876	September 3, 2019	Justice Sonia Sotomayor, Maggie Gyllenhaal, Tatiana Schlossberg	N/A
A Closer Look
877	September 4, 2019	Tracee Ellis Ross, Maren Morris	Maren Morris
Amber Says What, Bad Sponsors
878	September 5, 2019	Senator Bernie Sanders, DeRay McKesson	N/A
A Closer Look
879	September 9, 2019	Kelly Clarkson, Bashir Salahuddin & Diallo Riddle, CJ Hauser	N/A
A Closer Look
880	September 10, 2019	John McEnroe, Toni Collette	The Hold Steady
Friends Episodes for 2019, Jokes Seth Can't Tell
881	September 11, 2019	Jennifer Lopez, Michael Sheen	Mika
A Closer Look
882	September 12, 2019	Wendy Williams, Kaitlyn Dever, Eric Holder	N/A
A Closer Look
883	September 16, 2019	Dax Shepard, Lilly Singh	N/A
A Closer Look
884	September 17, 2019	John Goodman, Michael C. Hall	Midland
Late Night with Seth Meyers Democratic Presidential Debate, Back in My Day (with John Goodman)
885	September 18, 2019	Chelsea Handler, Sara Gilbert	Tove Lo
A Closer Look, What Does Karen Know?
886	September 19, 2019	Glenn Howerton, Andrew Yang, Margaret Atwood	N/A
A Closer Look, Margaret Atwood reads Seth's palms
887	September 23, 2019	Hasan Minhaj, Liza Koshy	Jade Bird
One of My Writers Explains a Joke, A Closer Look
888	September 24, 2019	Gwen Stefani, Bradley Whitford, Emily Spivey	N/A
Ya Burnt, Fred Armisen: Art Aficionado
889	September 25, 2019	Anna Kendrick, Kal Penn, Edi Patterson	N/A
A Closer Look
890	September 26, 2019	Woody Harrelson, Kieran Culkin, Bobby Flay	N/A
A Closer Look, Fred Armisen: Art Aficionado
891	September 30, 2019	Chris Hayes, Sean Casey & Kevin Millar	Avril Lavigne
A Closer Look

=== October ===
No.	Original release date	Guest(s)	Musical/entertainment guest(s)
892	October 1, 2019	Phoebe Waller-Bridge, Ta-Nehisi Coates	Gary Gulman
The Kind of Story We Need Right Now, Seth mispronounces the word Caribbean
893	October 2, 2019	Nick Kroll, Zazie Beetz, Representative Katie Porter	N/A
A Closer Look
894	October 3, 2019	Billy Bob Thornton, Beth Ditto	Lauv featuring Anne-Marie
Impeachment Process Commercial, A Closer Look
895	October 7, 2019	David Harbour, Ryan Eggold	Lauren Daigle
A Closer Look, David Harbour calls The Duffer Brothers
896	October 8, 2019	Kenan Thompson, David Remnick	N/A
Hey!, Live New Yorker Cartoons Part VIII: Wry Hard with a Vengeance
897	October 9, 2019	Ted Danson, Elizabeth Olsen, Diane von Fürstenberg	N/A
A Closer Look
898	October 10, 2019	Sam Rockwell, Lucy Boynton	Les Savy Fav
A Closer Look, Interactive Series
899	October 21, 2019	Mariska Hargitay, Lizzy Caplan	Sam Fender
A Closer Look
900	October 22, 2019	James Spader, Tim Meadows, Alison Roman	N/A
Amber Ruffin discusses Donald Trump's views on lynching, Late Night with Seth Meyers Democratic Presidential Debate
901	October 23, 2019	Jessica Biel, Jesse Plemons, Brooks Wheelan	N/A
A Closer Look
902	October 24, 2019	Willem Dafoe, Kathryn Hahn	A$AP Ferg
A Closer Look, Call of the Florida Man
903	October 28, 2019	Senator Kamala Harris, Mark Duplass	Omar Apollo
One of My Writers Explains a Joke, A Closer Look
904	October 29, 2019	Emma Thompson, Alex Moffat, Jeremy O. Harris	N/A
Hey!, Seth Explains Teen Slang, Mildred Mildew
905	October 30, 2019	John Krasinski, Joel Kim Booster, Amy McGrath	N/A
A Closer Look, Joel Kim Booster shows his tattoos, Joel Kim Booster recites passage from the Bible
906	October 31, 2019	Timothée Chalamet, Cynthia Erivo	Miranda Lambert
A Closer Look, What Does Karen Know?

=== November ===
No.	Original release date	Guest(s)	Musical/entertainment guest(s)
907	November 4, 2019	Gloria Steinem, Ahmir "Questlove" Thompson & Tariq "Black Thought" Trotter	Wilco
A Closer Look, Jokes Seth Can't Tell (with Gloria Steinem)
908	November 5, 2019	Kristin Chenoweth, Michael Kelly, Sinéad Burke	N/A
Ya Burnt, New Sponsors
909	November 6, 2019	Jim Gaffigan, Jenny Slate	MUNA
A Closer Look
910	November 7, 2019	John Cena, Gugu Mbatha-Raw	N/A
A Closer Look, The Conservative Perspective
911	November 11, 2019	Whoopi Goldberg, Thomas Middleditch	Doja Cat & Tyga
A Closer Look, Whoopi Goldberg brings Seth a Christmas sweater, Seth acknowledges the passing of Rick Ludwin
912	November 12, 2019	Taron Egerton, Steve Kornacki, Mark Fischbach	N/A
The Kind of Story We Need Right Now, The Check In
913	November 13, 2019	Sebastian Maniscalco, Liz Phair	Liz Phair
A Closer Look, Seth compares streaming services to the trill of popping a wheelie
914	November 14, 2019	Sean Hayes, Jean Smart, Anna Baryshnikov	N/A
A Closer Look
915	November 18, 2019	Sienna Miller, Matthew Rhys, Jacqueline Woodson	N/A
Five Phases of Trump's Annual Physical, A Closer Look
916	November 19, 2019	Robert Pattinson, Al Gore, Nicole Rucker	N/A
A Closer Look
917	November 20, 2019	Adam Driver, Jonathan Groff	Hozier
A Closer Look
918	November 21, 2019	Dolly Parton, Tobias Menzies, Representative Ro Khanna	N/A
A Closer Look
919	November 25, 2019	Sterling K. Brown, Gilbert Gottfried, Derren Brown	N/A
A Closer Look, Fred Armisen: Art Aficionado
920	November 26, 2019	Oscar Isaac, Casey Wilson	Jon Pardi
Amber Says What, Amber Ruffin gives Seth a gift, Late Night with Seth Meyers Democratic Presidential Debate, Fred Armisen: Art Aficionado
921	November 27, 2019	Jeff Goldblum, Jacqueline Novak	N/A
A Closer Look, Fred Armisen: Art Aficionado, Bryce Tinsley
922	November 28, 2019	Josh Meyers, Larry & Hilary Meyers	N/A
Jokes Seth Can't Tell (with Hilary Meyers), Fred Armisen: Art Aficionado, Pictionary (Hilary & Seth Meyers Vs. Larry & Josh Meyers), Two Turkeys and a Pilgrim

=== December ===
No.	Original release date	Guest(s)	Musical/entertainment guest(s)
923	December 9, 2019	Quentin Tarantino, Aisling Bea, Michael Lewis	N/A
A Closer Look
924	December 10, 2019	Saoirse Ronan, Alex Borstein, Dan Soder	N/A
A Closer Look
925	December 11, 2019	Jack Black, Ari Melber	N/A
A Closer Look, Seth's opinions on pennies
926	December 12, 2019	Keri Russell, Michelle Wolf	N/A
A Closer Look, Late Night Dioramas, Michelle Wolf reads jokes she sent in to the show
927	December 16, 2019	Representative Adam Schiff, Bowen Yang	Tyler Childers
A Closer Look, Fred Armisen: Art Aficionado
928	December 17, 2019	Robert De Niro, Guy Pearce, Joe Pera	N/A
Crimes Donald Trump Has Committed, Jenny Hagel pitches lesbian Hallmark Channel holiday films, The Kind of Story We Need Right Now, Fred Armisen: Art Aficionado, Joe Pera brings Seth a snowman cake
929	December 18, 2019	John Mulaney, Rodrigo Santoro	N/A
A Closer Look
930	December 19, 2019	John Lithgow, Ana Gasteyer	Ana Gasteyer
A Closer Look, Fred Armisen: Art Aficionado
