= Rahn Mayo =

American politician

Member of the Georgia House of Representatives from the 84th district
- In office 2009–2017
- Preceded by: Stacey Abrams
- Succeeded by: Renitta Shannon

Personal details
- Party: Democratic
- Education: Howard University
- Website: Rep. Rahn Mayo, Georgia House of Representatives

Rahn Mayo is a former Democratic member of the Georgia House of Representatives, serving from 2009 until January 2017. In addition to his service in the legislature, Mayo has also worked as a real estate broker, radio co-host, and sales executive.

Mayo's father, Whitman Mayo, was an actor on Sanford and Son (playing the role of Fred's best friend Grady Wilson) and other programs.
