= Becky Evans =

American politician

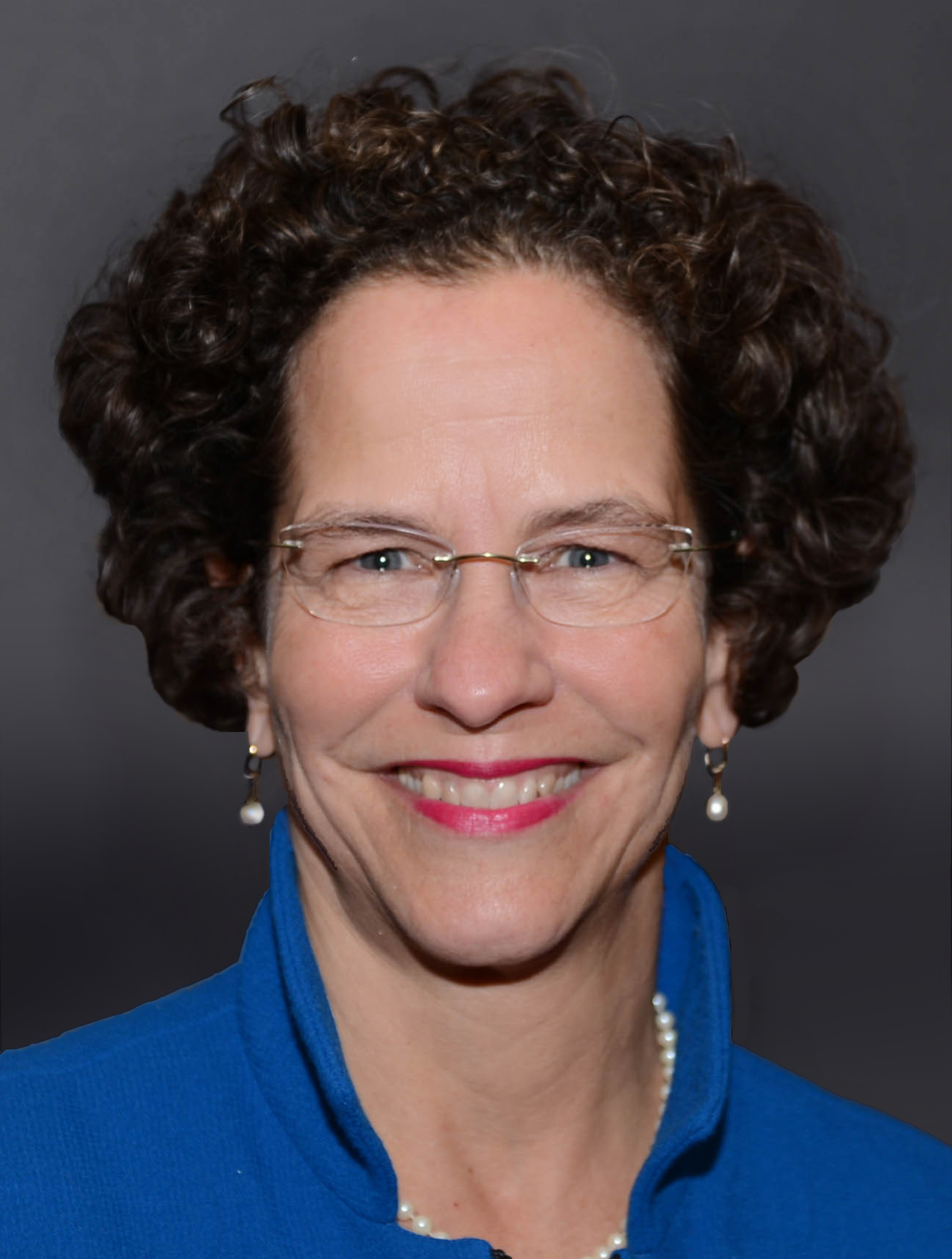

Member of the Georgia House of Representatives
- In office January 14, 2019 – January 13, 2025
- Preceded by: Howard Mosby
- Succeeded by: Omari Crawford
- Constituency: 83rd District (2019–2023); 89th District (2023–2025)

Personal details
- Born: July 26, 1961 (age 65) Dallas, Texas
- Party: Democratic
- Spouse: David Evans
- Children: 3 children
- Education: Emory University
- Website: www.beckyevans.com

Rebecca Nell Farmer Evans (born July 26, 1961) is an American politician from Atlanta, Georgia. A member of the Democratic Party, she was a Georgia state representative after defeating Democratic Party incumbent Howard Mosby in the 83rd district, in November 2018. In 2022, she was elected in the 89th district, following changes to district numbers after redistricting.

== Early life and career ==
Evans was born in Dallas, Texas. She holds a Bachelor's degree from Emory University. Evans lives in Atlanta, Georgia, with her husband David.

== Political career ==
Evans was elected to the Georgia House of Representatives in 2018 in District 83.

In the 2024 election, Evans lost the re-nomination for the new District 90 to fellow incumbent Saira Draper in a redistricting battle.

Georgia House of Representatives
Preceded by Howard Mosby	Member of the Georgia House of Representatives from the 83rd district 2019–2023	Succeeded by Karen Lupton
Preceded by Bee Nguyen	Member of the Georgia House of Representatives from the 89th district 2023–2025	Succeeded by Omari Crawford
