= Karen Lupton =

American politician

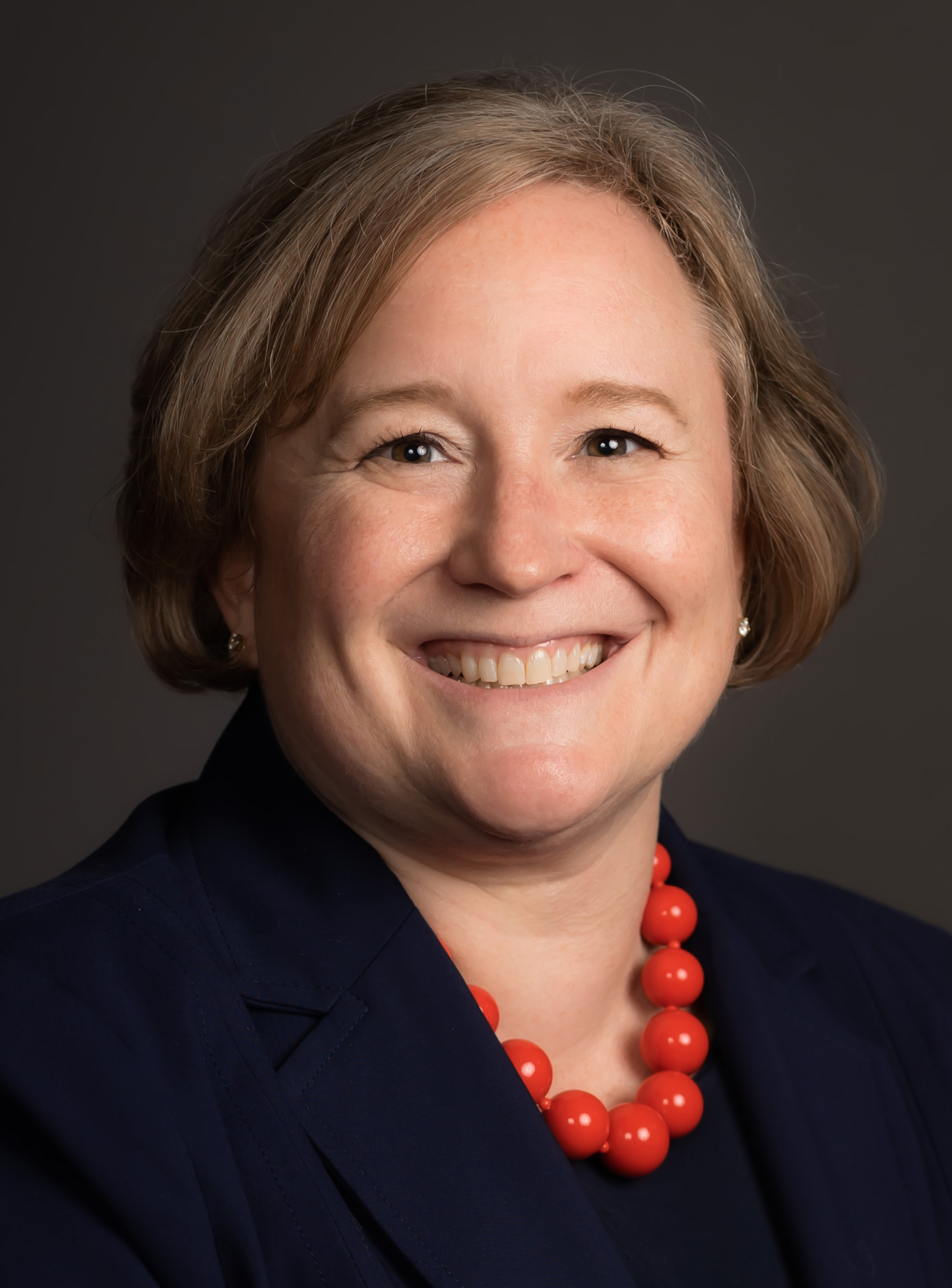

Member of the Georgia House of Representatives from the 83rd district
- Incumbent
- Assumed office January 9, 2023
- Preceded by: Becky Evans (redistricting)

Personal details
- Party: Democratic

Karen Elizabeth Lupton (née Stein) is an American politician from the Georgia Democratic Party who serves as a member of the Georgia House of Representatives representing District 83.
