= Georgia's 83rd House of Representatives district =

State district in Georgia, USA

Georgia's 83rd State House of Representatives district
Representative
Karen Lupton; D–Chamblee
- Demographics: 33.5% White; 59.6% Black; 2.2% Hispanic; 1.7% Asian
- Population: 55,226

District 83 elects one member of the Georgia House of Representatives. It contains parts of DeKalb County.

== Members ==
- Howard Mosby (until 2019)
- Becky Evans (2019–2023)
- Karen Lupton (since 2023)
