= Georgia's 84th House of Representatives district =

State district in Georgia, USA

Georgia's 84th State House of Representatives district
Representative
| Mary Margaret Oliver; D–Decatur |
- Demographics: 32.0% White; 60.5% Black; 2.0% Hispanic; 3.3% Asian
- Population: 55,291

District 84 elects one member of the Georgia House of Representatives. It contains parts of DeKalb County.

== Members ==
- Stacey Abrams (2007–2009)
- Rahn Mayo (2009–2017)
- Renitta Shannon (2017–2023)
- Omari Crawford (2023–2025)
- Mary Margaret Oliver (since 2025)
