= While Justice Sleeps =

2021 legal thriller novel by Stacey Abrams

- First edition cover
- Author: Stacey Abrams
- Language: English
- Genre: Legal thriller
- Set in: Washington, D.C.
- Publisher: Doubleday
- Publication date: May 11, 2021
- Publication place: United States
- Media type: Print, e-book, audiobook
- Pages: 384
- ISBN: 978-0-385-54657-7 (hardcover)
- OCLC: 1248723801
- Dewey Decimal: 813/.6
- LC Class: PS3601.B746 W45 2021

While Justice Sleeps is a legal thriller novel authored by American politician and writer Stacey Abrams, published on May 11, 2021.

== Background ==
The book centers around a law clerk for an Associate Justice of the Supreme Court of the United States. After the justice becomes gravely ill, the law clerk becomes his legal guardian. Abrams commented the inspiration for the book came from a conversation with her mother, in which her mother noted Article Three of the United States Constitution allows for a lifetime appointment for justices, but "has no failsafe for a person being physically unable to do the job."

== Publication ==
The novel is the first one published with Abrams' name, as her previous novels have all been written under the pen name Selena Montgomery.

Immediately following its release, the book was the #1 on The New York Times Best Seller list for fiction novels.

== Television adaptation ==
The novel is currently being produced as a television series by Working Title Films, a subsidiary of Universal Pictures.
