= Howard Mosby =

American politician from Georgia

Howard Mosby (born June 20, 1961) is an American politician from Georgia. Mosby is a former member of the Georgia House of Representatives for District 83 and District 90.

== Early life and education ==
Mosby was born in Atlanta to Gwendolyn Mizell Mosby, a retired Burgess-Peterson Elementary School (Atlanta) teacher. Mosby's father is Nathaniel "Nate" Mosby, who served as the second African American to the DeKalb County Commission. Nate Mosby was also chairman of the DeKalb Community Relations Commission, and served as the DeKalb community representative on the Atlanta Regional Commission. Mosby's father was employed as one of the first African American managers of the Federal Aviation Administration.

Mosby graduated from East Atlanta High School. Mosby earned an AA in business administration from Georgia Perimeter College now Georgia State University in 1989, when it was called DeKalb College. Mosby graduated from Georgia State University in 1992 with a Bachelor of Business Administration in Finance.

Mosby has three brothers and one sister; David Mosby, Warren Mosby, Phillip Mosby and Natalyn M. Archibong. Mosby's sister, Natalyn Mosby Archibong served as an elected council member on the Atlanta City Council. His brother David serves as a former elected city council member of Oak Ridge, Tennessee's city council.

== Career ==
Mosby is a Certified Public Accountant. Beginning his healthcare career in internal audit at the Grady Health System, Mosby quickly rose through the managerial ranks and became Vice President of Faculty Contracts Administration in the Division of Medical Affairs at the major healthcare institution.

Mosby was first elected to the Georgia House of Representatives in 2002. Mosby is a Democrat, formerly serving District 83.

Mosby served on four House committees; Ways & Means, Health and Human Services, Governmental Affairs and State Planning and Community Affairs.

In 2006, Mosby graduated from the Flemming Leadership Institute and was given the Arthur S. Flemming Award.

In 2009, Mosby assumed the chairmanship of the DeKalb County delegation to the Georgia House of Representatives.

Mosby currently serves as chairman of the Board of Directors of the 1st Choice Credit Union, and chairman of the advisory board of the East Lake Branch of the Metropolitan YMCA. He also served on the board of the Georgia Charitable Care Network as its treasurer. Rep. Mosby is also the past Treasurer of the National Black Caucus of State Legislators. He is a co-founder and Treasurer of the Health Education Advocacy Learning Collaborative (H.E.A.L.)

On May 22, 2018, Mosby was defeated in the Democratic primary by Becky Evans. No Republican qualified to run in the general election of November 2018.

== Personal ==
Mosby is unmarried and has one son.
