= Renitta Shannon =

American politician (born 1979)

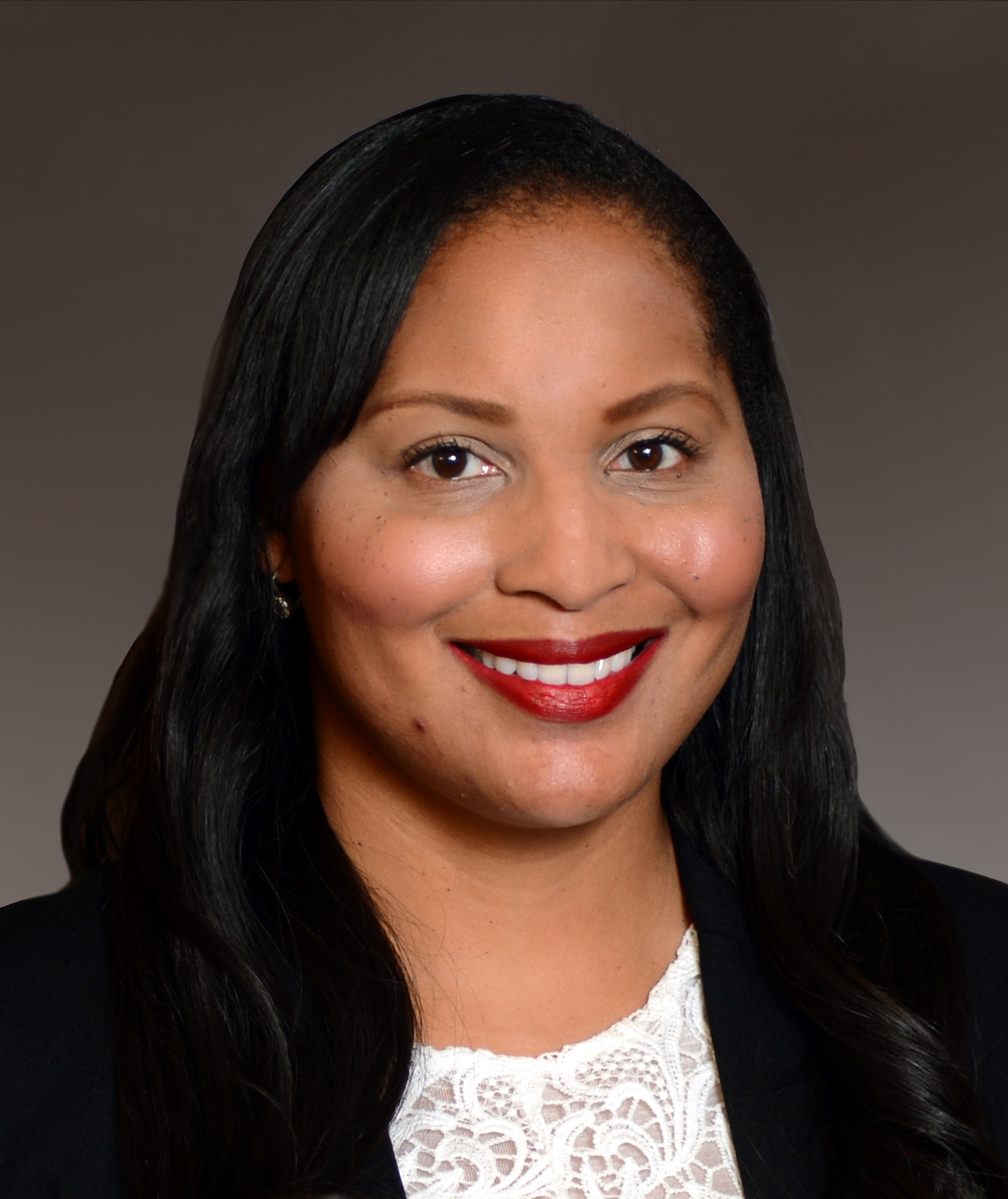

Member of the Georgia House of Representatives from the 84th district
- In office January 9, 2017 – January 9, 2023
- Preceded by: Rahn Mayo
- Succeeded by: Omari Crawford

Personal details
- Born: Renitta Shanbay Shannon; December 29, 1979 (age 46)
- Party: Democratic
- Education: University of Florida (BA)
- Website: Campaign website

Renitta Shanbay Shannon (born December 29, 1979) is an American politician who served as a Democratic member of the Georgia House of Representatives. In 2016, Shannon defeated a four-term Democratic incumbent. In January 2017, she was sworn into the Georgia State House of Representatives to represent the 84th district.

In 2017, she came out as bisexual, making her the first bisexual legislator to serve in the Georgia General Assembly.

== Early life ==
Shannon was born in Florida. After college, she worked in business development for a variety of sectors including mental health and financial services. In a 2019 interview, she said that she spent most of her free time as an activist on racial justice, economic justice, criminal justice, and equality issues, including as an organizer for various progressive grassroots organizations.

== Career ==
She defeated incumbent representative Rahn Mayo in the Democratic primaries in 2016, and went on to win the seat in District 84 unopposed in the 2016 general election.

According to Shannon, she ran for office "to fight for policies that truly support women, working people, and people of color" and has written about improving representation and of electing queer black women into public office.

In her 2019–2020 term, she was appointed the Chair of the House Democratic Criminal Justice Reform Committee and is a member of the Governmental Affairs, Small Business Development, and Insurance committees positions she continued in for her 2021–2022 term, with the addition of the State Planning and Community Affairs Committee.

She ran for Lieutenant Governor of Georgia in the 2022 election.
