= Omari Crawford =

American politician

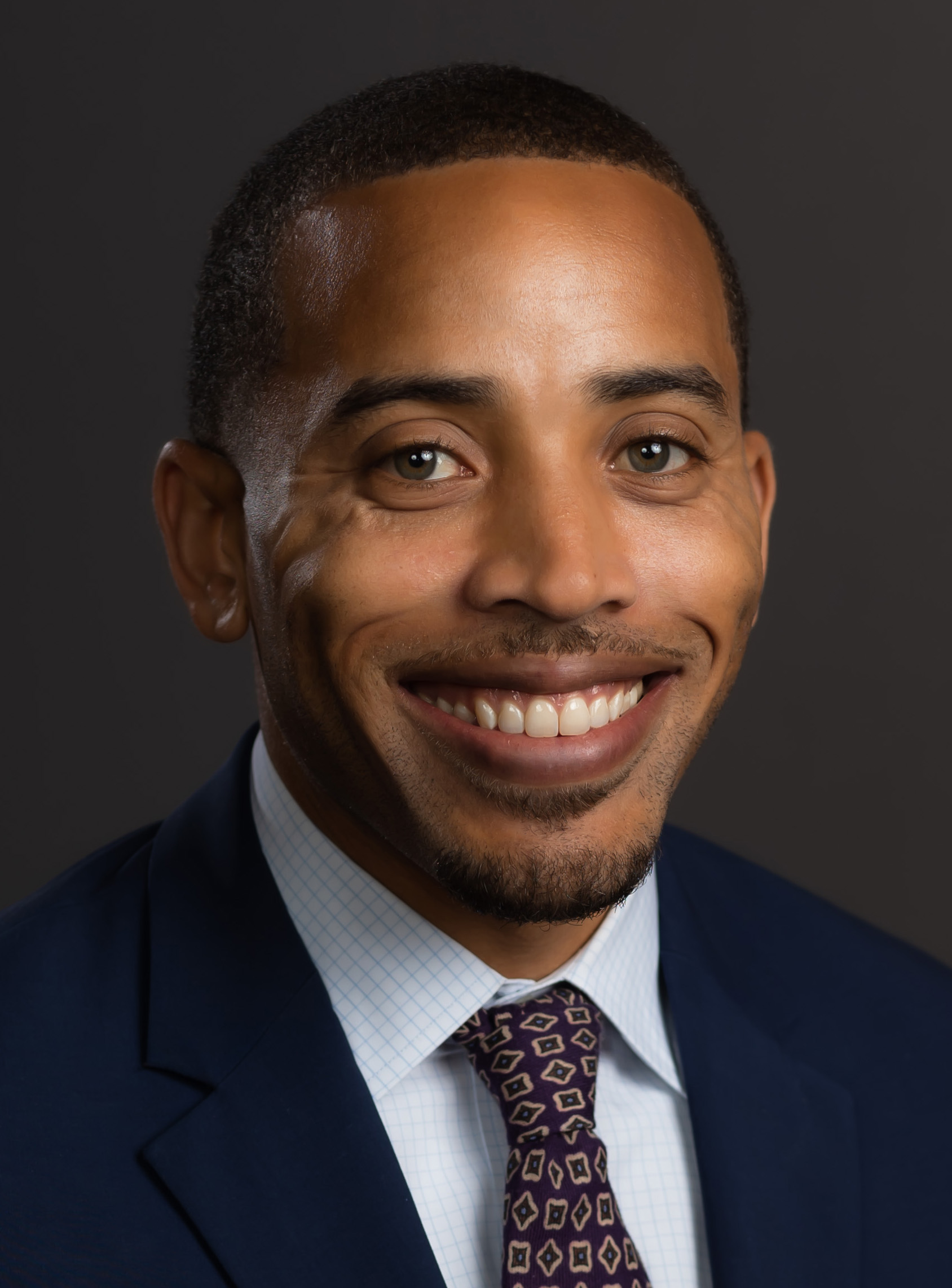

Member of the Georgia House of Representatives
- Incumbent
- Assumed office January 9, 2023
- Preceded by: Renitta Shannon (redistricting)
- Constituency: 84th district (2023-2025); 89th district (2025-present)

Personal details
- Party: Democratic
- Education: Florida A&M University (B.S., M.P.A.); North Carolina Central University (J.D., M.B.A.)

Omari Jarvon Crawford is an American politician from the Georgia Democratic Party who serves as a member of the Georgia House of Representatives representing District 89. He was first elected in 2022.

Crawford attended Florida A&M University on a track and field scholarship, earning a place on the All-Academic Conference Team for three consecutive years. He had previously been on the track team at Southwest DeKalb High School. He earned a Bachelor of Science in political science and a Master of Public Administration (M.P.A.) from FAMU, in 2008 and 2009, respectively. Crawford later completed a dual-degree program at North Carolina Central University, earning both a Juris Doctor and a Master of Business Administration in 2013.

Crawford was an Assistant County Attorney in DeKalb County, Georgia.
