= Georgia's 89th House of Representatives district =

State district in Georgia, USA

Georgia's 89th State House of Representatives district
Representative
Omari Crawford; D–Decatur
- Demographics: 32.0% White; 60.5% Black; 2.0% Hispanic; 3.3% Asian
- Population: 55,291

District 89 elects one member of the Georgia House of Representatives. It contains parts of DeKalb County.

== Members ==
- Becky Evans (2023–2025)
- Omari Crawford (since 2025)
