= Stacey Abrams =

American politician, lawyer, activist, and author (born 1973)

- Abrams in 2026

Minority Leader of the Georgia House of Representatives
- In office January 10, 2011 – July 1, 2017
- Preceded by: DuBose Porter
- Succeeded by: Bob Trammell

Member of the Georgia House of Representatives
- In office January 8, 2007 – August 25, 2017
- Preceded by: JoAnn McClinton
- Succeeded by: Bee Nguyen
- Constituency: 84th district (2007–2013); 89th district (2013–2017)

Personal details
- Born: Stacey Yvonne Abrams; December 9, 1973 (age 52) Madison, Wisconsin, U.S.
- Party: Democratic
- Relatives: Leslie Abrams Gardner (sister)
- Education: Spelman College (BA); University of Texas, Austin (MPA); Yale University (JD)
- Website: Official website
- Abrams's voice Abrams on her 2018 gubernatorial campaign. Recorded February 23, 2018

Stacey Yvonne Abrams (/ˈeɪbrəmz/; born December 9, 1973) is an American politician, lawyer, voting rights activist, and author who served in the Georgia House of Representatives from 2007 to 2017, serving as minority leader from 2011 to 2017. A member of the Democratic Party, Abrams founded Fair Fight Action, an organization to address voter suppression, in 2018. Her efforts have been widely credited with boosting voter turnout in Georgia, including in the 2020 presidential election, when Joe Biden narrowly won the state, and in Georgia's 2020–21 regularly scheduled and special U.S. Senate elections, which gave Democrats control of the Senate.

Abrams was the Democratic nominee in the 2018 Georgia gubernatorial election, becoming the first African-American female major-party gubernatorial nominee in the United States. She lost the election to Republican candidate Brian Kemp by a narrow margin of 1.4%. In February 2019, Abrams became the first African-American woman to deliver a response to the State of the Union address. She was the Democratic nominee in the 2022 Georgia gubernatorial election, and lost again to Kemp, this time by a much larger margin of 7.5%.

Abrams is an author of both fiction and nonfiction. Her nonfiction books, Our Time Is Now and Lead from the Outside, were New York Times best sellers. Abrams wrote eight fiction books under the pen name Selena Montgomery before 2021. While Justice Sleeps was released on May 11, 2021, under her real name. Abrams also wrote a children's book, Stacey's Extraordinary Words, released in December 2021.

== Early life and education ==
The second of six siblings, Abrams was born to Robert and Carolyn Abrams in Madison, Wisconsin, and raised in Gulfport, Mississippi where her father was employed in a shipyard and her mother was a librarian. In 1989, when Abrams was a junior in high school, the family moved to Atlanta, Georgia, where her parents pursued graduate divinity degrees at Emory University. They became Methodist ministers and later returned to Mississippi with their three youngest children while Abrams and two other siblings remained in Atlanta. She attended Avondale High School, graduating as valedictorian in 1991. In 1990, she was selected for the Telluride Association Summer Program. At 17, while still in high school, she was hired as a typist for a congressional campaign and then as a speechwriter based on the improvements she made to a campaign speech.

In 1991, Abrams began attending Spelman College, where she received encouragement from college president Johnnetta Cole to run for campus office; by her senior year, Abrams was elected student-government president. In 1995, she earned a Bachelor of Arts in interdisciplinary studies (political science, economics, and sociology) from Spelman, magna cum laude. While in college, she worked in the youth services department in the office of Atlanta mayor Maynard Jackson. She later interned at the U.S. Environmental Protection Agency.

As a freshman in June 1992, Abrams took part in a protest on the steps of the Georgia Capitol, during which she joined in burning the Georgia state flag which, at the time, incorporated the Confederate battle flag. It had been added to the state flag in 1956 as an anti-civil rights movement action. The June 1992 protest occurred not long after the acquittal of four Los Angeles police officers in the beating of African-American motorist Rodney King, and the subsequent Los Angeles riots—a set of events that has been called a turning point in Abrams's understanding of politics.

As a Harry S. Truman Scholar, Abrams studied public policy at the University of Texas at Austin's LBJ School of Public Affairs, where she earned a Master of Public Affairs degree in 1998. Afterward, she earned a Juris Doctor from Yale Law School.

== Legal and business career ==
After graduating from law school, Abrams worked as a tax attorney at the Sutherland Asbill & Brennan law firm in Atlanta, with a focus on tax-exempt organizations, health care, and public finance. In 2010, while a member of the Georgia General Assembly, Abrams co-founded and served as the senior vice president of NOW Corp. (formerly NOWaccount Network Corporation), a financial services firm.

Abrams is CEO of Sage Works, a legal consulting firm that has represented clients including the Atlanta Dream of the Women's National Basketball Association.

=== Nourish and Now ===
Abrams co-founded Nourish, Inc. in 2010. Originally conceived as a beverage company with a focus on infants and toddlers, it was later rebranded as Now and pivoted its business model to an invoicing solution for small businesses. Now raised a $9.5 million Series A in 2021.

=== Rewiring America ===
In mid-March 2023, community electrification advocacy nonprofit group Rewiring America announced it had hired Abrams as senior counsel.

== Political career ==
In 2002, at age 29, Abrams was appointed a deputy city attorney for the City of Atlanta.

=== Georgia General Assembly ===
In 2006, Abrams ran for the 84th District for the Georgia House of Representatives, following JoAnn McClinton's announcement that she would not seek reelection. Abrams ran in the Democratic Party primary election against former state legislator George Maddox and political operative Dexter Porter. She outraised her two opponents and won the primary election with 51% of the vote, avoiding a runoff election.

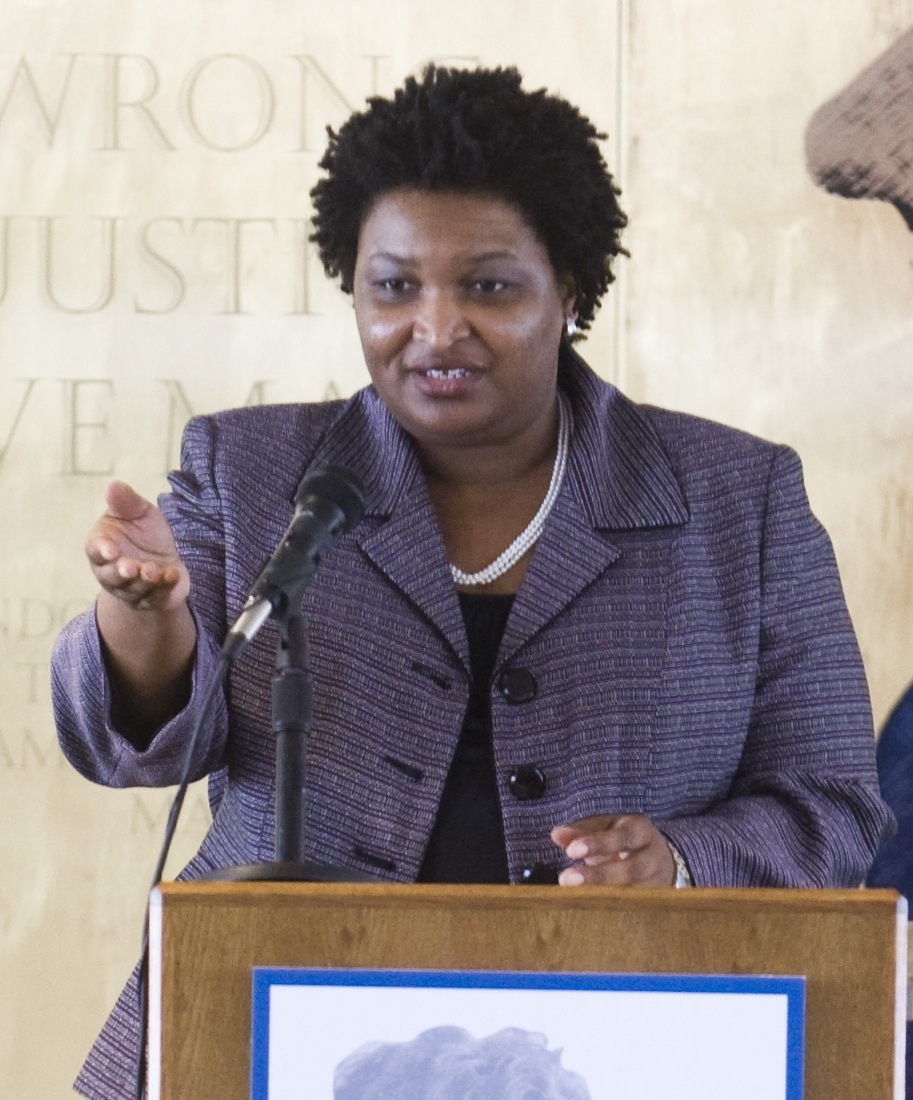
Abrams in 2012

Abrams represented House District 84 beginning in the 2007 session, and beginning in the 2013 session (following reapportionment), District 89. Both districts covered portions of the City of Atlanta and unincorporated DeKalb County, covering the communities of Candler Park, Cedar Grove, Columbia, Druid Hills, Edgewood, Highland Park, Kelley Lake, Kirkwood, Lake Claire, South DeKalb, Toney Valley, and Tilson. She served on the Appropriations, Ethics, Judiciary Non-Civil, Rules, and Ways & Means committees.

In November 2010, the Democratic caucus elected Abrams to succeed DuBose Porter as minority leader over Virgil Fludd. Abrams's first major action as minority leader was to cooperate with Republican governor Nathan Deal's administration to reform the HOPE Scholarship program. She co-sponsored the 2011 legislation that preserved the HOPE program by decreasing the scholarship amount paid to Georgia students and funded a 1% low-interest loan program for students.

According to Time magazine, Abrams "can credibly boast of having single-handedly stopped the largest tax increase in Georgia history." In 2011 Abrams argued that a Republican proposal to cut income taxes while increasing a tax on cable service would lead to a net increase in taxes paid by most people. She performed an analysis of the bill that showed that 82% of Georgians would see net tax increases, and left a copy of the analysis on the desk of every House legislator. The bill subsequently failed.

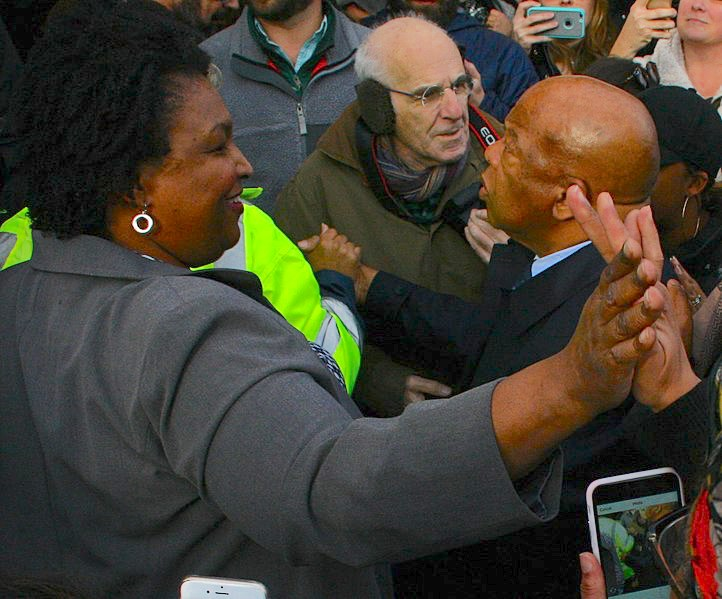
Abrams with John Lewis in 2017

Abrams also worked with Deal on criminal-justice reforms that reduced prison costs without increasing crime, and with Republicans on the state's biggest-ever public transportation funding package.

On August 25, 2017, Abrams resigned from the General Assembly to focus on her gubernatorial campaign.

=== 2018 gubernatorial campaign ===
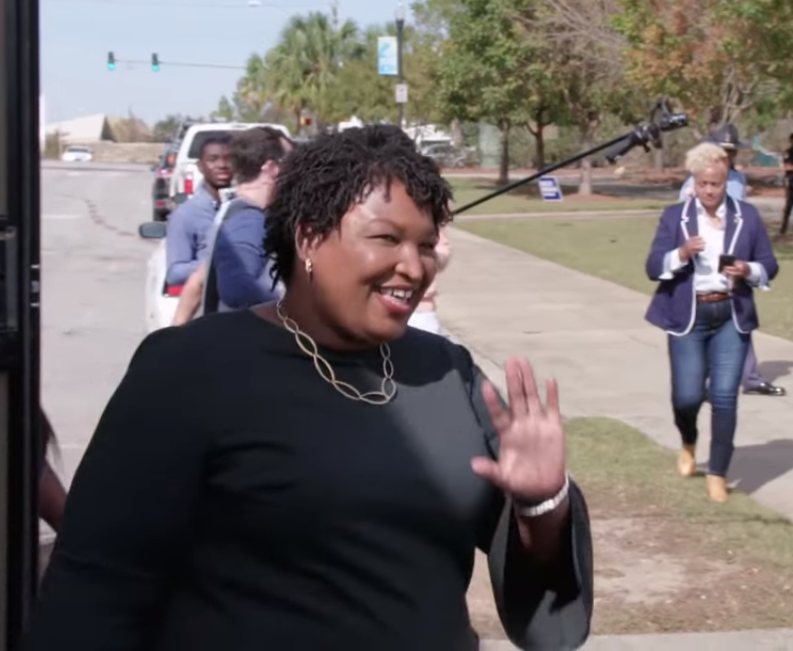

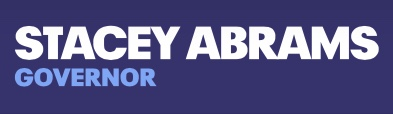
Stacey Abrams campaigns in 2018 for Governor of Georgia

Abrams ran for governor of Georgia in 2018. In the Democratic primary she ran against Stacey Evans, another member of the Georgia House of Representatives, in what some called "the battle of the Staceys". Abrams was endorsed by Bernie Sanders and Our Revolution. On May 22, she won the Democratic nomination, making her the first Black woman in the U.S. to be a major party's nominee for governor. After winning the primary, Abrams secured a number of high-profile endorsements, including one from former president Barack Obama.

Almost a week before election day, the Republican nominee, Georgia secretary of state Brian Kemp, canceled a debate scheduled seven weeks earlier to attend a Trump rally. Kemp blamed Abrams for the cancellation, saying she was unwilling to reschedule it. Abrams's campaign manager responded, "We refuse to callously take Georgians for granted and cancel on them. Just because Brian Kemp breaks his promises doesn't mean anyone else should."

Two days before the election, Kemp's office announced that it was investigating the Georgia Democratic Party for unspecified "possible cybercrimes"; the Georgia Democratic Party stated that "Kemp's scurrilous claims are 100 percent false" and described them as a "political stunt". A 2020 investigation by the Georgia attorney general's office concluded that there was no evidence of computer crimes. Later that year, it was revealed that the alleged cybercrime against Kemp's office was in fact a planned security test that one of Kemp's staff members had signed off on three months prior.

As Georgia's secretary of state, Kemp was in charge of elections and voter registration during the election. Kemp was accused of voter suppression during the election between him and Abrams. Emory University professor Carol Anderson has criticized Kemp as an "enemy of democracy" and "an expert in voter suppression" for his actions as secretary of state. Political scientists Michael Bernhard and Daniel O'Neill described Kemp's actions in the 2018 gubernatorial election as the worst case of voter suppression in that election year. Election law expert Richard L. Hasen called Kemp "perhaps the most incompetent state chief elections officer" in the 2018 elections, pointing to a number of actions that jeopardized Georgia's election security and made it harder for eligible voters to vote. Hasen writes that it was "hard to tell" which of Kemp's "actions were due to incompetence and which were attempted suppression."

Between 2012 and 2018, Kemp's office canceled over 1.4 million voter registrations, with nearly 700,000 cancellations in 2017 alone. On a single night in July 2017, half a million voters had their registrations canceled. According to The Atlanta Journal-Constitution, election-law experts said that this "may represent the largest mass disenfranchisement in US history." Kemp oversaw the removals as secretary of state, and did so eight months after he declared his candidacy for governor. An investigative journalism group run by Greg Palast found that of the approximately 534,000 Georgians whose voter registrations were purged between 2016 and 2017, more than 334,000 still lived where they were registered. The voters were given no notice that they had been purged. Palast sued Kemp, claiming over 300,000 voters were purged illegally. Kemp's office denied any wrongdoing, saying that by "regularly updating our rolls, we prevent fraud and ensure that all votes are cast by eligible Georgia voters."

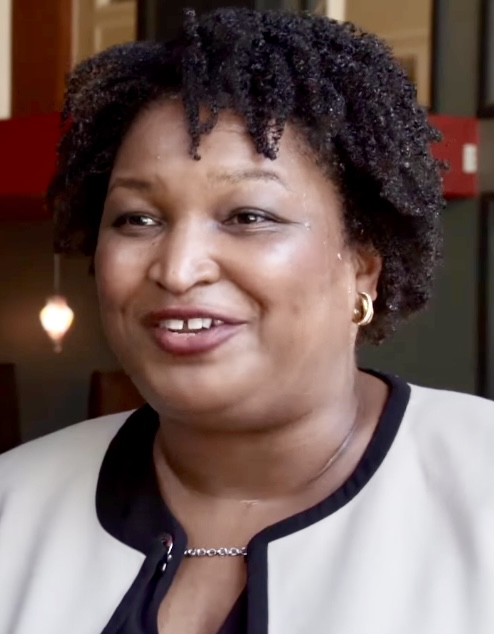
Abrams in 2018

By early October 2018, more than 53,000 voter registration applications had been put on hold by Kemp's office, with more than 75% belonging to minorities. The voters were eligible to re-register if they still lived in Georgia.

In a ruling against Kemp, district judge Amy Totenberg found that Kemp's office had violated the Help America Vote Act and said an attempt by Kemp's office to expedite the certification of results "appears to suggest the secretary's foregoing of its responsibility to confirm the accuracy of the results prior to final certification, including the assessment of whether serious provisional balloting count issues have been consistently and properly handled."

On November 6, 2018, Abrams lost the election by 54,723 votes. On November 16, 2018, Abrams announced that she was ending her campaign. She emphasized that her statement was not a concession, because "concession means to acknowledge an action is right, true, or proper", but acknowledged that she could not close the gap with Kemp to force a runoff. In her campaign-ending speech, Abrams announced the creation of Fair Fight Action, a voting rights nonprofit organization that sued the secretary of state and state election board in federal court for voter suppression. Fair Fight was supported by Jess Moore Matthews and her Backbone Digital Leaders and others committed to ensuring full representation

Fair Fight's lawsuit was initiated in December 2018; according to Politico, it "started as a sprawling case that included allegations of unreasonably long lines and wait times caused by moving and closing polling places; the impact of voter ID rules on people of color, voters with non-Anglo Saxon names and newly naturalized citizens; improper maintenance of Georgia's voter rolls; inadequate training of poll workers; and even the integrity of voting machines". Six months after the lawsuit began, the Georgia legislature passed a law addressing some of its claims, with measures including the implementation of new voting machines with more advanced technology. Fair Fight dropped the claims about voting machines in December 2020, around the time that Donald Trump made baseless claims about voting machine problems in Georgia affecting the 2020 presidential election. In February 2021, a federal judge ruled that Fair Fight's claims about voting machines, voter list security, and polling place issues were resolved by changes in Georgia's election law, or invalidated due to lack of standing to sue.

In April 2021, a judge allowed some claims in the legal challenge to proceed while rejecting others. In October 2022, a federal judge ruled against Fair Fight on the remaining claims, finding that Georgia's voting regulations did not violate the Constitution or the Voting Rights Act. According to the judge, the case "resulted in wins and losses for all parties over the course of the litigation and culminated in what is believed to have been the longest voting rights bench trial in the history of the Northern District of Georgia." Over the course of the lawsuit, Fair Fight raised $61 million and paid millions to Allegra Lawrence-Hardy, Abrams's campaign chair.

Since losing the election, Abrams has repeatedly said that the election was not fairly conducted and has declined to call Kemp the legitimate governor of Georgia. Abrams has since said that she won the election and that the election was "stolen from the voters of Georgia", claims that election law expert Richard L. Hasen said were unproven, though he argued that "it's clear that Kemp did everything in his power to put in place restrictive voting policies that would help his candidacy and hurt his opponent, all while overseeing his own election." Abrams argued that Kemp, who oversaw the election in his role as secretary of state, had a conflict of interest and suppressed turnout by purging nearly 670,000 voter registrations in 2017, and that about 53,000 voter registrations were pending a month before the election. She has said, "I have no empirical evidence that I would have achieved a higher number of votes. However, I have sufficient and I think legally sufficient doubt about the process to say that it was not a fair election."

On November 9, 2018, the Atlanta Journal-Constitution reported that its investigation of the 2018 statewide elections in Georgia had found "no evidence ... of systematic malfeasance – or of enough tainted votes to force a runoff election". A USA Today fact check noted that the actions Kemp's office took during the election "can be explained as routine under state and federal law"; political scientist Charles S. Bullock III said there is "not much empirical evidence supporting the assertion that Kemp either suppressed the vote or 'stole' the election from Abrams."

According to Washington Post fact checker Glenn Kessler, Abrams has variously claimed that she "won" the election, that the election was "rigged", that it was "stolen", that it was not "free and fair", and that Kemp had "cheated". Kessler said that "Abrams played up claims the election was stolen until such tactics became untenable for anyone who claims to be an advocate for American democratic norms and values".

=== Role in federal politics ===
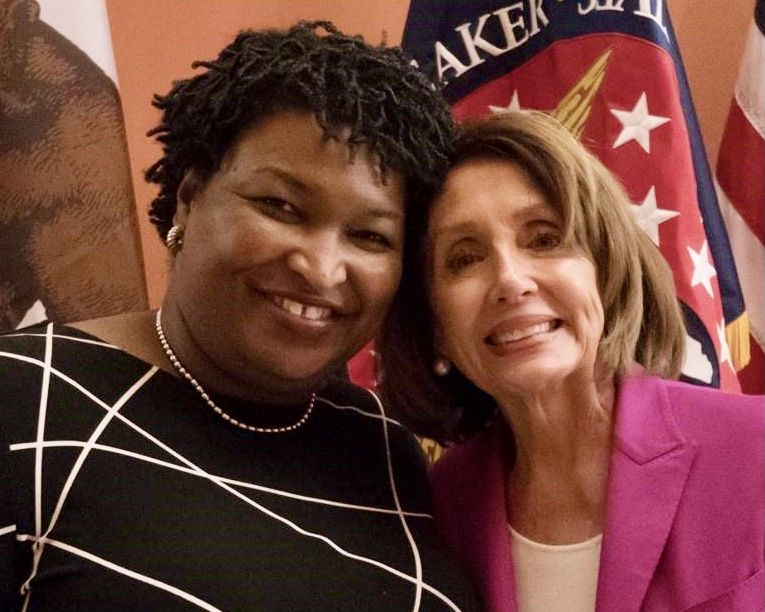
Stacey Abrams and Nancy Pelosi in January 2019

On January 29, 2019, Senate minority leader Chuck Schumer (D-NY) announced that Abrams would deliver the response to the State of the Union address on February 5. She was the first African-American woman to give the rebuttal to the address, as well as the first and only non-office-holding person to do so since the State of the Union responses began in 1966. Despite being heavily recruited by Schumer, the Democratic National Committee, and the Democratic Senatorial Campaign Committee to challenge incumbent senator David Perdue, on April 30, 2019, Abrams announced that she would not run for the U.S. Senate in 2020. After Senator Johnny Isakson announced his resignation due to poor health, Abrams declined to run in that election as well, citing a need to focus on ending voter suppression.

On August 17, 2019, Abrams announced the founding of Fair Fight 2020, an organization to assist Democrats financially and technically to build voter protection teams in 20 states. Abrams is Fair Fight Action 2020's chair. Billionaire and former New York City mayor Michael Bloomberg contributed $5 million shortly after announcing his run for the 2020 Democratic presidential nomination. On ABC's The View, Abrams defended Bloomberg's spending, saying: "Every person is allowed to run and should run the race that they think they should run, and Mike Bloomberg has chosen to use his finances. Other people are using their dog, their charisma, their whatever." Abrams declined to endorse Bloomberg personally.

During the 2020 Democratic presidential primaries, Abrams actively promoted herself for consideration as former vice president Joe Biden's running mate. Kamala Harris was officially announced as Biden's running mate on August 11, 2020. Abrams was selected as one of 17 speakers to jointly deliver the keynote address at the 2020 Democratic National Convention.

After Biden won the 2020 U.S. presidential election, both The New York Times and The Washington Post credited Abrams with a large boost in Democratic votes in Georgia and an estimated 800,000 new voter registrations. As part of that election, she served as an elector for the state of Georgia.

=== 2022 gubernatorial campaign ===
On December 1, 2021, Abrams announced she would run again for governor of Georgia. She ran unopposed in the Democratic primary on May 24, 2022, and faced Georgia governor Brian Kemp in the November 8 general election. Abrams and Kemp had their first of two scheduled debates on October 17. In the debate, Abrams emphasized her support for gun control and legal access to abortion, while Kemp emphasized Georgia's economy under his governorship and his anti-crime proposals. When asked whether she would accept the results of the election, Abrams declined to directly respond. In the final debate before the election both candidates agreed to accept the results. Abrams lost the November 8, 2022 election to Kemp; she conceded that night.

=== 2026 ===
Abrams did not run in the 2026 Georgia gubernatorial election, having announced in January of that year that she would not seek the governorship for a third time. Instead, she supported Democratic Party candidates in Georgia and other states. The election resulted in the victory of Keisha Lance Bottoms, who became the first Black woman elected governor of a U.S. state.

== Political positions ==
Abrams supports abortion rights, advocates for expanded gun control, and opposes proposals for stricter voter ID laws. She has argued that some implementations of voter ID laws disenfranchise minorities and the poor, but does not oppose voter ID laws in principle and supports voters having to verify their identities. Abrams pledged to oppose legislation similar to the religious freedom bill that would allow otherwise-illegal discrimination by businesses if done on the grounds of religious conscience.

=== Criminal justice reform ===
Abrams supports criminal justice reform in the form of no cash bail for poor defendants, abolishing the death penalty, and decriminalizing possession of small amounts of marijuana. She also supports community policing to keep communities safe as part of criminal justice reform.

=== Education ===
Abrams would like to increase spending on public education. She opposes private school vouchers, instead advocating improvements to the public education system. She supports smaller class sizes, more school counselors, protected pensions, better pay for teachers, and expanded early childhood education.

=== Health care ===
In her campaign for governor, Abrams said her top priority was Medicaid expansion. She cited research showing that Medicaid expansion improved health care access for low-income residents and made hospitals in rural locations financially viable. She also created a plan to address Georgia's high maternal mortality rate.

=== Israeli–Palestinian conflict ===
Abrams is a strong supporter of Israel and rejects "the demonization and delegitimization of Israel represented" by the Boycott, Divestment and Sanctions campaign, which she has called "anti-Semitic". However, she voted against Georgia's anti-BDS legislation, which punishes companies that choose to boycott Israel or Israeli-occupied territories. Abrams wrote, "Boycotts have been a critical part of social justice in American history, particularly for African-Americans. As the Anti-Defamation League notes, the origin of BDS is based in the anti-apartheid movement."

== Writing career ==
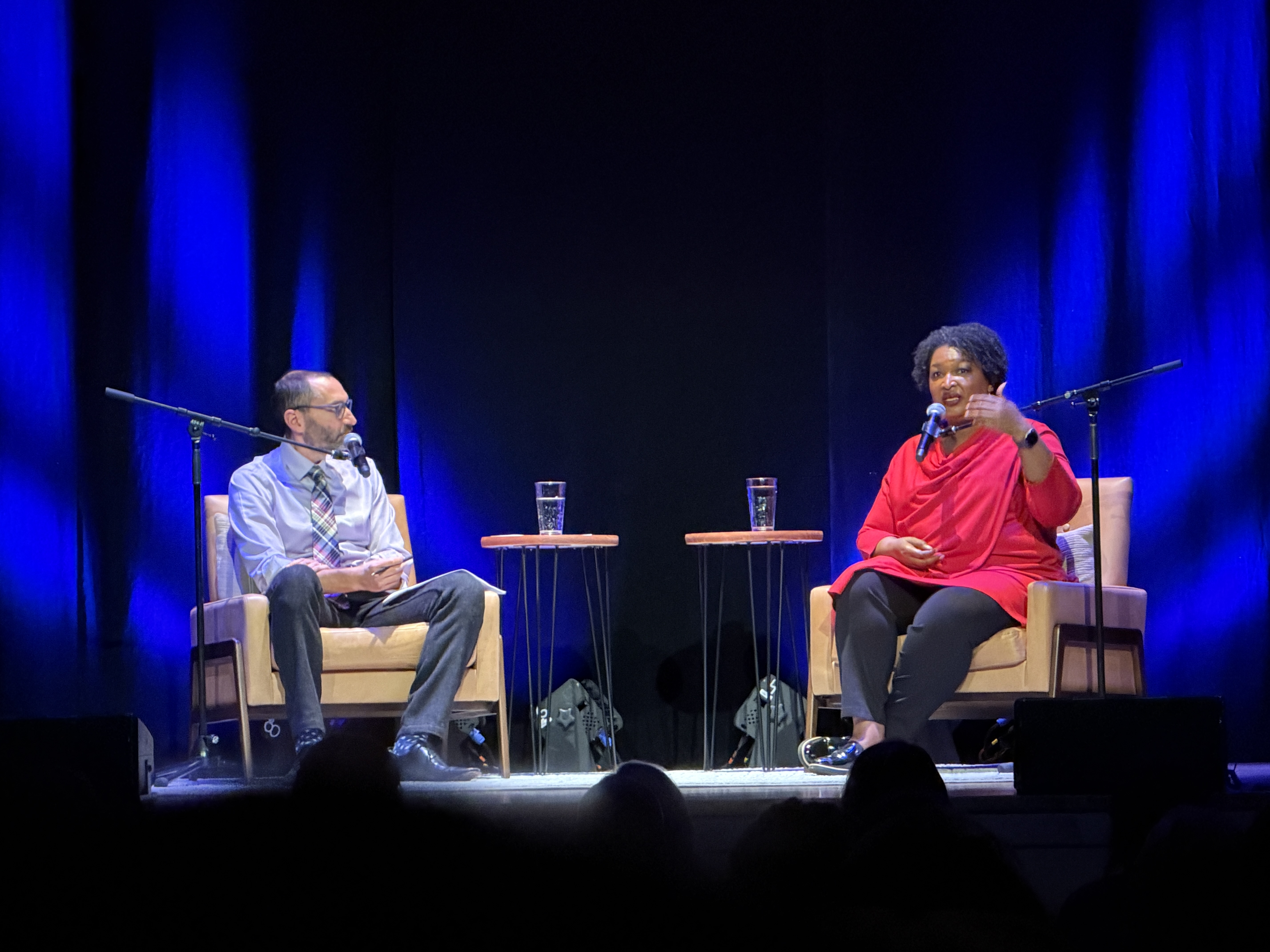
Dave Miller of OPB Interviews Stacey Abrams Nov. 8, 2025 at the Portland Book Festival.

Outside of politics, Abrams has had a successful career as a fiction writer. Until 2021, she published her works under the pen name Selena Montgomery. By her own account, Abrams has sold more than 100,000 copies of her novels. She wrote her first novel during her third year at Yale Law School. Her legal thriller While Justice Sleeps was published (under her own name) in May 2021. An adaptation of the novel into a television series began development by Working Title Films, a subsidiary of Universal Pictures in 2021.

In 2025, she released the third installment of her Avery Keene series, a thriller novel about artificial intelligence titled Coded Justice.

Abrams' writing career and her political career connect through the fundraising event that she inspired, Romancing the Runoff, where romance authors raised funds for voting rights in Georgia. Two of her nonfiction works, Our Time is Now and Lead from the Outside, were New York Times best sellers.

Abrams has published articles on public policy, taxation, and nonprofit organizations. She is the author of Minority Leader: How to Lead from the Outside and Make Real Change (published by Henry Holt & Co. in April 2018), and Our Time Is Now: Power, Purpose, and the Fight for a Fair America (published by Henry Holt & Co. in June 2020).

In April 2025, the U.S. Naval Academy library banned 381 books, including Abrams' Our Time Is Now: Power, Purpose, and the Fight for a Fair America, under U.S. President Donald Trump's executive order concerning diversity, equity, and inclusion (DEI).

== Honors and awards ==
In 2012, Abrams received the John F. Kennedy New Frontier Award from the Kennedy Library and Harvard University's Institute of Politics, which honors an elected official under 40 whose work demonstrates the impact of elective public service as a way to address public challenges. In 2014 Governing Magazine named her a Public Official of the Year, an award that recognizes state and local official for outstanding accomplishments. Abrams was recognized as one of "12 Rising Legislators to Watch" by the same publication in 2012 and one of the "100 Most Influential Georgians" by Georgia Trend each year between 2012 and 2017.

EMILY's List recognized Abrams as the inaugural recipient of the Gabrielle Giffords Rising Star Award in 2014. She was selected as an Aspen Rodel Fellow and a Hunt-Kean Fellow. In 2014, Abrams was named 11th most influential African American aged 25 to 45 by The Root, rising to first place in 2019. Abrams was named Legislator of the Year by the Georgia Alliance of Community Hospitals, Public Servant of the Year by the Georgia Hispanic Chamber of Commerce, Outstanding Public Service by the Latin American Association, Champion for Georgia Cities by the Georgia Municipal Association, and Legislator of the Year by the DeKalb County Chamber of Commerce.

Abrams received the Georgia Legislative Service Award from the Association County Commissioners Georgia, the Democratic Legislator of the Year from the Young Democrats of Georgia and Red Clay Democrats, and an Environmental Leader Award from the Georgia Conservation Voters. She is a lifetime member of the Council on Foreign Relations, a Next Generation Fellow of the American Assembly, an American Marshall Memorial Fellow, a Salzburg Seminar–Freeman Fellow on U.S.-East Asian Relations, and a Yukos Fellow for U.S.–Russian Relations.

Abrams received the Stevens Award for Outstanding Legal Contributions and the Elmer Staats Award for Public Service, both national honors presented by the Harry S. Truman Foundation. She was also a 1994 Harry S. Truman Scholar.

In 2001, Ebony magazine named Abrams one of "30 Leaders of the Future". In 2004 she was named to Georgia Trend's "40 Under 40" list, and the Atlanta Business Chronicle named Abrams to its "Top 50 Under 40" list. In 2006 she was named a Georgia Rising Star by Atlanta Magazine and by Law & Politics Magazine.

Abrams received a single vote, from Kathleen Rice, in the 2019 election for speaker of the U.S. House of Representatives.

In 2019, Abrams received the Distinguished Public Service Award from the University of Texas LBJ School of Public Affairs, where she obtained her Master's of Public Affairs in 1998. The award is the highest honor bestowed upon alumni of the school, with recipients selected by their fellow alumni. The award reflects her "remarkable leadership on behalf of her constituents as well as citizens all over this country", according to Dean Angela Evans.

For her nonviolent campaign to get out the vote, Abrams was nominated for a Nobel Peace Prize. In 2021, she was included in the Time 100, Time's annual list of the 100 most influential people in the world.

Abrams was nominated for the Primetime Emmy Award for Outstanding Character Voice-Over Performance in 2021 for her work on an election-themed special episode of Black-ish. She lost at the 73rd Primetime Creative Arts Emmy Awards to Maya Rudolph of Big Mouth. In 2025, she was elected to the American Academy of Arts and Sciences.

== Other work ==
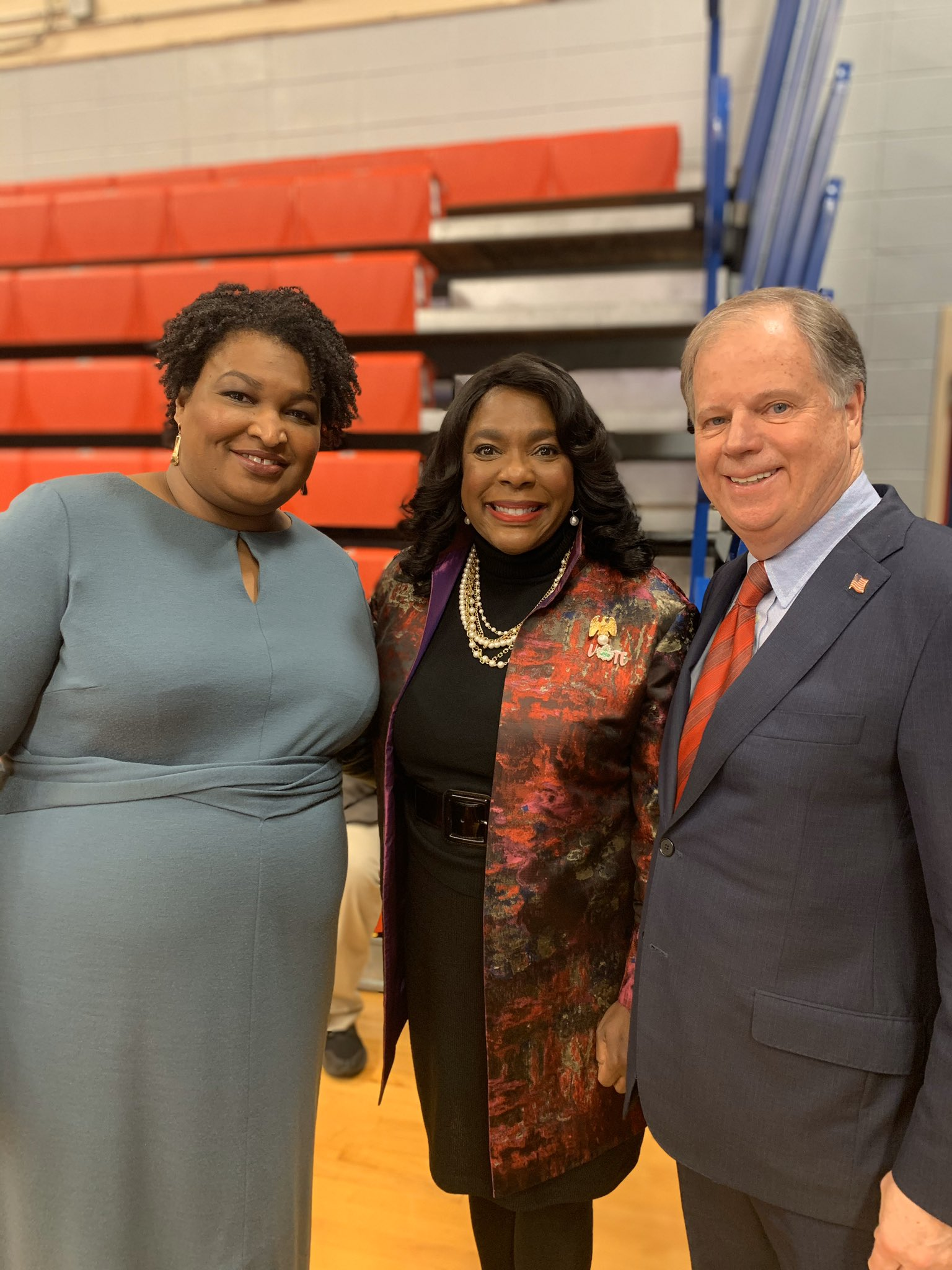
Abrams with Terri Sewell and Doug Jones at the 55th Anniversary Bridge Crossing Jubilee in Selma, Alabama in 2020

Abrams has served on the boards of directors for Democratic Legislative Campaign Committee, the Center for American Progress, Atlanta Metropolitan State College Foundation, Gateway Center for the Homeless, and the Georgia Partnership for Excellence in Education; and on the advisory boards for Literacy Action and Health Students Taking Action Together (HSTAT). She also serves on the Board of Visitors for Agnes Scott College and the University of Georgia, as well as on the board of advisors for Let America Vote (a voting rights organization founded by former Missouri secretary of state Jason Kander).

Abrams has completed seven international fellowships and traveled to "more than a dozen foreign countries" for policy work. She is a lifetime member of the Council on Foreign Relations and spoke at CFR's Conference on Diversity in International Affairs in 2019. She has also spoken at London's Chatham House, the National Security Action Forum, and a conference hosted by the Yale Kerry Initiative and Jackson Institute for Global Affairs. In 2019, Abrams contributed an essay to Foreign Affairs magazine on how identity politics strengthens liberal democracy.

Abrams was featured in All In: The Fight For Democracy, a documentary by Lisa Cortés and Liz Garbus about voter suppression in the United States. In it, she talks about her family's voting struggles in Mississippi and voter suppression during her 2018 Georgia gubernatorial campaign.

Abrams appeared as an actor in "Coming Home", the season 4 finale of Star Trek: Discovery, as the president of United Earth.

Abrams began hosting her podcast, Assembly Required with Stacey Abrams, on August 15, 2024 through Crooked Media, with her first episode interviewing Cynthia Richie Terrell, co-founder of FairVote.

On April 5, 2023 Howard University announced the appointment of Abrams to the inaugural Ronald W. Walters Endowed Chair for Race and Black Politics. The chair is housed in the Ronald W. Walters Leadership and Public Policy Center at Howard University.

=== New Georgia Project ===
In 2013, Abrams founded the New Georgia Project; an organization "to engage, register and build power for traditionally underrepresented groups". In January 2025, the New Georgia Project admitted to 16 violations of state campaign finance laws. The organization was fined $300,000 by the Georgia Ethics Commission for illegally spending millions of dollars to support Abrams' 2018 gubernatorial election, the largest fine for campaign finance violations in state history. In October 2025, the New Georgia Project ended all operations.

== Personal life ==
Abrams is the second of six children born to Reverend Carolyn and Reverend Robert Abrams, originally of Mississippi. Her siblings include Andrea Abrams, U.S. district judge Leslie Abrams Gardner, Richard Abrams, Walter Abrams, and Jeanine Abrams McLean.

In April 2018, Abrams wrote an op-ed for Fortune revealing that she owed $54,000 in federal back taxes and held $174,000 in credit card and student loan debt. She was repaying the Internal Revenue Service (IRS) incrementally on a payment plan after deferring her 2015 and 2016 taxes, which she stated was necessary to help with her family's medical bills. During the 2018 Georgia gubernatorial election, she donated $50,000 to her own campaign. In 2019, she completed payment of her back taxes to the IRS in addition to other outstanding credit card and student loan debt reported during the gubernatorial campaign.

== Electoral history ==
Democratic primary results, 2018
Party	Candidate	Votes	%
Democratic	Stacey Abrams	424,305	76.44
Democratic	Stacey Evans	130,784	23.56
Total votes		555,089	100.0

2018 Georgia gubernatorial election
Party	Candidate	Votes	%
Republican	Brian Kemp	1,978,408	50.2%
Democratic	Stacey Abrams	1,923,685	48.8%
Libertarian	Ted Metz	37,235	1.0%

Democratic primary results, 2022
Party	Candidate	Votes	%
Democratic	Stacey Abrams	726,113	100%

2022 Georgia gubernatorial election
Party	Candidate	Votes	%
Republican	Brian Kemp	2,111,572	53.4%
Democratic	Stacey Abrams	1,813,673	45.9%
Libertarian	Shane Hazel	28,163	0.7%

== Books ==
- Abrams, Stacey (April 24, 2018). Minority Leader: How to Build Your Future and Make Real Change. New York: Henry Holt and Co. ISBN 978-1250191298. OCLC 1003252451.
- —— (June 9, 2020). Our Time Is Now: Power, Purpose, and the Fight for a Fair America. New York: Henry Holt and Co. ISBN 978-1250257703. OCLC 1145087492.
- —— (May 11, 2021). While Justice Sleeps: A Novel. Avery Keene 1. New York: Doubleday. ISBN 978-0-385-54657-7. OCLC 1248723801.
- —— (December 28, 2021). Stacey's Extraordinary Words. New York: Balzer + Bray. ISBN 978-0-063-20947-3. OCLC 1285933000.
- —— (May 23, 2023). Rogue Justice: A Thriller. Avery Keene 2. New York: Doubleday. ISBN 978-0385548328. OCLC 1346615705.
- —— (July 15, 2025). Coded Justice: A Thriller. Avery Keene 3 (First hardcover ed.). New York: Doubleday. ISBN 978-0385548342. OCLC 1454849781.

=== Romance novels (as Selena Montgomery) ===
Stacey Abrams authored eight novels under the pen name Selena Montgomery.

- Montgomery, Selena (April 24, 2001). Rules of Engagement. Arabesque Books/BET Publications. ISBN 978-1583142240. OCLC 47236242.
- —— (December 25, 2001). The Art of Desire. Arabesque Books/BET Publications. ISBN 978-1583142646. OCLC 48714733.
- —— (October 25, 2002). Power of Persuasion. Washington, D.C.: Arabesque Books/BET Publications. ISBN 978-1583142653. OCLC 1035558096.
- —— (June 14, 2004). Never Tell. New York: St. Martin's Paperbacks. ISBN 978-0312993061. OCLC 1246146151.
- —— (April 25, 2006). Hidden Sins. New York: HarperTorch. ISBN 978-0060798499. OCLC 67712090.
- —— (December 26, 2006). Secrets and Lies. New York: Avon. ISBN 978-0060798512. OCLC 77546746.
- —— (June 24, 2008). Reckless. New York: Avon. ISBN 978-0061376030. OCLC 156816662.
- —— (March 31, 2009). Deception. New York: Avon. ISBN 978-0061376054. OCLC 232977965.

Georgia House of Representatives
Preceded by DuBose Porter	Minority Leader of the Georgia House of Representatives; 2011–2017	Succeeded by Bob Trammell
Party political offices
Preceded by Jason Carter	Democratic nominee for Governor of Georgia; 2018, 2022	Succeeded by Keisha Lance Bottoms
Preceded by Joe Kennedy III	Response to the State of the Union address 2019	Succeeded by Gretchen Whitmer
Preceded by Elizabeth Warren	Keynote Speaker of the Democratic National Convention; 2020; Served alongside: Raumesh Akbari, Colin Allred, Brendan Boyle, Yvanna Cancela, Kathleen Clyde, Nikki Fried, Robert Garcia, Malcolm Kenyatta, Marlon Kimpson, Conor Lamb, Mari Manoogian, Victoria Neave, Jonathan Nez, Sam Park, Denny Ruprecht, Randall Woodfin	Succeeded by Angela Alsobrooks
