= Jacqueline Novak =

American stand-up comedian and actress

- Born: September 3, 1982 (age 43); Winston-Salem, North Carolina, U.S.
- Education: Georgetown University
- Occupations: Actress; comedian

Jacqueline Novak (born September 3, 1982) is an American stand-up comedian, actor, writer, and published author. Her off-Broadway, one-woman show Get On Your Knees was a New York Times "Critic's Pick.", and her performance was nominated for a 2020 Drama Desk Award for Outstanding Solo Performance. In 2024, Get On Your Knees was made into a Netflix special, directed by Natasha Lyonne. for which she received a 2024 Emmy nomination for Outstanding Writing for a Variety Special.

Novak's memoir How to Weep in Public: Feeble Offerings on Depression from One Who Knows was published by Three Rivers Press, an imprint of Crown, in 2016. She currently co-hosts a weekly wellness/comedy podcast Poog with friend Kate Berlant. Poog was named one of the ten best podcasts of 2021 by Time Magazine, as well one of the 10 best comedy podcasts of 2021 by Vulture.

== Early life ==
Novak was born in Winston-Salem, North Carolina, the daughter of Gregory Novak, a retired marketing executive, and Naomi (Wall) Novak. Her mother is Jewish, her father's parents were Christian. She is the youngest of three children. The family moved to Chappaqua, New York when she was two years old. She attended Horace Greeley High School there and then went on to Georgetown University. Novak and John Mulaney were in the same college improv troupe at Georgetown, both cast by Nick Kroll, who himself was cast in that troupe a couple of years earlier by Mike Birbiglia.

== Career ==
After graduating from college, Novak began doing stand-up in the downtown New York City comedy scene, often hosting shows with comic/actor John Early. During this time, she wrote her memoir How to Weep in Public. She put her efforts next on developing a one woman show, which eventually became the hit Off-Broadway performance Get On Your Knees.

Novak has appeared on Late Night with Seth Meyers and as well as The Tonight Show Starring Jimmy Fallon. She has also been on The Late Late Show with James Corden, HBO's 2 Dope Queens, Watch What Happens Live with Andy Cohen, and has had her own half-hour stand-up special on Comedy Central's The Half Hour.

Her TV credits include appearances on Inside Amy Schumer (Comedy Central), Animals (HBO), and The Characters (Netflix). She has also written for Broad City (Comedy Central), Good Talk with Anthony Jeselnik (Comedy Central), and Soft Focus with Jena Friedman (Adult Swim).

Since 2020, Novak has also co-hosted the comedy wellness podcast "POOG" alongside comedian Kate Berlant.

=== Get On Your Knees ===
Get On Your Knees began as a one-woman show Novak presented at the Edinburgh Festival Fringe in Scotland in 2018. At the time, the show was called How Embarrassing for Her. After the festival, she workshopped it in Los Angeles. Mike Birbiglia and Natasha Lyonne saw the show, and Birbiglia decided to produce it for a six-week Off-Broadway run at the Cherry Lane Theatre in Manhattan's West Village. Lyonne agreed to present it. John Early was chosen as director. Due to its popularity, the run at Cherry Lane was extended, then moved to the larger Off-Broadway Lucille Lortel Theatre, also in the West Village. Recognized on two New York Times lists, "Best Theater of 2019" and "Best Comedy of 2019", the show was extended several more times.

A U.S. and international tour of the show was scheduled in 2020, but due to COVID-19 it was postponed. The show's tour resumed in 2021 and continued into 2022.

Get On Your Knees was released as a Netflix comedy special directed by Natasha Lyonne on January 23, 2024. She received a 2024 Emmy nomination for Outstanding Writing for a Variety Special for the Netflix special.
