= List of Late Night with Seth Meyers episodes (2016) =

- No. of episodes: 163 (and 1 special)

Release
- Original network: NBC

Season chronology
- ← Previous; 2015 episodes Next → 2017 episodes

This is the list of episodes for Late Night with Seth Meyers in 2016.

== 2016 ==
=== January ===
| No. | Original release date | Guest(s) | Musical/entertainment guest(s) |
|---|---|---|---|
| 305 | January 4, 2016 | Jennifer Hudson, Jennifer Jason Leigh | Zella Day |
Making a Talk Show Host, A Closer Look, Venn Diagrams
| 306 | January 5, 2016 | Samuel L. Jackson, The Kids in the Hall, Sana Amanat | N/A |
New Slogans
| 307 | January 6, 2016 | Christian Slater, Retta | Sam Hunt |
A Closer Look, Bad Sponsors
| 308 | January 7, 2016 | Tim Roth, La La Anthony, Jillian Bell & Charlotte Newhouse | N/A |
Seth's opinions on birds, Late Night with Seth Meyers Democratic Presidential Debate
| 309 | January 11, 2016 | Trevor Noah, David Cross | X Ambassadors |
A Closer Look, Extreme Dog Shaming
| 310 | January 12, 2016 | Eva Longoria, Jason Mantzoukas, Sunil Yapa | N/A |
A Closer Look, Gus the Late Night Janitor, Seth reads Jason Mantzoukas' projects
| 311 | January 13, 2016 | Ice Cube, Heather Graham | Kelsea Ballerini |
Couple Things, Deep Google, Jamiroquai Superfan
| 312 | January 14, 2016 | Rashida Jones, Khloé Kardashian, Rachel Bloom | N/A |
El Chapo (Horatio Sanz), Ya Burnt
| 313 | January 18, 2016 | Lester Holt, Rob Corddry | Brothers Osborne |
A Closer Look, We Also Would've Accepted, Gene the Cameraman
| 314 | January 19, 2016 | James Spader, Jenna Fischer, Gad Elmaleh | N/A |
Seth reads John Kasich quotes, A Closer Look, The Four Elements, Seth and Jenna Fischer show South African signs, Gad Elmaleh teaches Seth a French phrase
| 315 | January 20, 2016 | Danny DeVito, Whitney Cummings | The Front Bottoms |
This Week in Numbers, Seth is a Cool Man
| 316 | January 21, 2016 | Paul Giamatti, Aubrey Plaza, Frank Bruni | N/A |
A Closer Look, Boston Accent Trailer (appearance by Rachel Dratch)
| 317 | January 25, 2016 | Dakota Johnson, Brian d'Arcy James, Adam McKay | Carly Rae Jepsen |
Venn Diagrams, Seth gives Dakota Johnson a pencil, What I Did During the Blizzard by Dakota Johnson, Brian D'Arcy James and Adam McKay
| 318 | January 26, 2016 | Kate Hudson, Jeffrey Dean Morgan, Brian Koppelman | N/A |
A Closer Look, Fred Armisen's Extremely Accurate TV Recaps, Late Night with Seth Meyers Demopublican Debate
| 319 | January 27, 2016 | Senator John McCain, J. B. Smoove | Lukas Graham |
Couple Things, Seth Polls Iowa Voters, Fred Armisen's Extremely Accurate TV Recaps

=== February ===
| No. | Original release date | Guest(s) | Musical/entertainment guest(s) |
|---|---|---|---|
| 320 | February 3, 2016 | Alan Cumming, Matt Harvey, Alexander Chee | N/A |
A Closer Look, Alan Cumming performs "Damned If I Do, Damned If I Don't"
| 321 | February 4, 2016 | Colin Jost, L.A. Reid | JoJo |
Hidden Credits, Sexy Household Items (Cupcake)
| 322 | February 5, 2016 | Leslie Mann, Joshua Jackson, Benjamin Walker | N/A |
A Closer Look, Ya Burnt
| 323 | February 8, 2016 | Rebel Wilson, Fred Savage | Parson James |
A Closer Look, Back in My Day
| 324 | February 9, 2016 | John Oliver, Aidy Bryant, April Bloomfield | N/A |
A Closer Look, Seth plugs the crew's calendar
| 325 | February 10, 2016 | Ryan Reynolds, Katie Lowes | Wynonna & The Big Noise |
A Closer Look, Popsicle Shtick
| 326 | February 11, 2016 | Susan Sarandon, Alison Brie, Katie Nolan | N/A |
Seth Explains Teen Slang, New Sponsors
| 327 | February 15, 2016 | Jason Sudeikis, Kelly Rohrbach, Matthew Heineman | N/A |
A Closer Look, Fred Armisen's Extremely Accurate TV Recaps, New Campaign Slogans
| 328 | February 16, 2016 | Anthony Anderson, Famke Janssen | Eleanor Friedberger |
A Closer Look, Fred Armisen's Extremely Accurate TV Recaps, Extreme Dog Shaming
| 329 | February 17, 2016 | Will Ferrell, Hannibal Buress | Dustin Lynch |
Venn Diagrams, Will Ferrell gives shoutouts, Fred Armisen's Extremely Accurate TV Recaps, Grown-Up Annie
| 330 | February 18, 2016 | Kiefer Sutherland, Carice van Houten | N/A |
A Closer Look, Fred Armisen's Extremely Accurate TV Recaps, Melisandre at Seth's baby shower
| 331 | February 22, 2016 | Anthony Mackie, Renée Elise Goldsberry, Neal Brennan | N/A |
A Closer Look, Neal Brennan reads one-liners, Neal Brennan's montage of his friendship with Seth
| 332 | February 23, 2016 | Bobby Cannavale, David Remnick | N/A |
A Closer Look, The Last Slice of the Pie Chart, Bobby Cannavale tells dirty joke, The Late Night Players perform The New Yorker cartoons
| 333 | February 24, 2016 | Casey Affleck, Zachary Levi, Dr. David Agus | N/A |
New Slogans, Seth's nephew Derrick
| 334 | February 25, 2016 | Angela Bassett, Rich Eisen | MisterWives |
A Closer Look, Ya Burnt
| 335 | February 29, 2016 | Carson Daly, Kristen Schaal | Nada Surf |
A Closer Look, Seth's deleted scene in Mad Max: Fury Road, Kristen Schaal proposes marriage

=== March ===
| No. | Original release date | Guest(s) | Musical/entertainment guest(s) |
|---|---|---|---|
| 336 | March 1, 2016 | Jennifer Lopez, Morris Chestnut, Joel Grey | N/A |
We Also Would've Accepted, Late Night with Seth Meyers Demopublicratic Presidential Debate
| 337 | March 2, 2016 | Keri Russell, Ilana Glazer & Abbi Jacobson | LP |
A Closer Look, Deep Google
| 338 | March 3, 2016 | Tina Fey, John Stamos, Jay Pharoah | N/A |
A Closer Look, Late Night Casserole, John Stamos and Seth read Fuller House reviews, Jay Pharaoh does impressions
| 339 | March 14, 2016 | Lupita Nyong'o, Hayes MacArthur | Chris Janson |
A Closer Look, Extreme Dog Shaming
| 340 | March 15, 2016 | Naomi Watts, Chris Cuomo | Bloc Party |
For the Record, Seth's opinions on scarves, Ben Warheit catches up spring breakers on the news
| 341 | March 16, 2016 | John Goodman, Joanna Newsom | Joanna Newsom |
Getting to Know Merrick Garland, A Closer Look, Seth Explains Teen Slang
| 342 | March 17, 2016 | Jennifer Garner, Thomas Middleditch, Melissa George | N/A |
A Closer Look, This Week in Numbers
| 343 | March 21, 2016 | Jeff Daniels, Sutton Foster, Cynthia D'Aprix Sweeney | N/A |
A Closer Look, Fred Armisen's Extremely Accurate TV Recaps, The Four New Planets
| 344 | March 22, 2016 | Henry Cavill, Nia Vardalos, Former Attorney General Eric Holder | N/A |
Seth acknowledges the 2016 Brussels bombings, A Closer Look, Fred Armisen's Extremely Accurate TV Recaps, Venn Diagrams
| 345 | March 23, 2016 | Ethan Hawke, Danielle Brooks, Louie Anderson | N/A |
Sorry! Not Sorry!, A Message to My Younger Self (Keri Russell, John Stamos, Henry Cavill, John Goodman), Fred Armisen's Extremely Accurate TV Recaps, Danielle Brooks makes balloon animals
| 346 | March 24, 2016 | Olivia Wilde, Paul Reubens | Joywave |
Seth acknowledges the death of Garry Shandling, Ya Burnt, Fred Armisen's Extremely Accurate TV Recaps, Paul Reubens teaches Seth how to play a balloon, Gørbøn Hausinfrud
| 347 | March 29, 2016 | Tracy Morgan, Maggie Siff, John Heilemann & Mark Halperin | N/A |
Seth announces the birth of his new baby, Tracy Morgan brings Seth a gift
| 348 | March 30, 2016 | Sally Field, Jemima Kirke | Aubrie Sellers |
Getting to Know Corey Lewandowski, A Closer Look, New Slogans
| 349 | March 31, 2016 | Pharrell Williams, Andrew Rannells, Corbin Maxey | N/A |
A Closer Look, Crew Poetry

=== April ===
| No. | Original release date | Guest(s) | Musical/entertainment guest(s) |
|---|---|---|---|
| 350 | April 4, 2016 | Claire Danes, Jerrod Carmichael, U.S. Ambassador to the United Nations Samantha Power | N/A |
A Closer Look
| 351 | April 5, 2016 | Matthew Perry & Thomas Lennon, Cecily Strong, Chuck Todd | N/A |
A Closer Look, Popsicle Schtick
| 352 | April 6, 2016 | Lena Dunham & Jenni Konner, Ashley Greene | Birdy |
A Closer Look
| 353 | April 7, 2016 | Senator Bernie Sanders, Savion Glover | Brandi Carlile |
Ya Burnt (Ya Bernt), Savion Glover tap dances, Seth can not pronounce "niche"
| 354 | April 11, 2016 | Kevin Costner, Rose McIver, Action Bronson | N/A |
A Closer Look, Seth promotes the Chrysler Pacifica, Joke Bucket
| 355 | April 12, 2016 | Anna Wintour, Eve | The Last Shadow Puppets |
Hidden Credits, Seth's Intervention
| 356 | April 13, 2016 | Tom Hiddleston, Maisie Williams | Rooney |
A Closer Look, Late Night with Seth Meyers Republocratican Presidential Debate, Tom Hiddleston does a Chris Evans impression. Timothy Olyphant drops by to complain that his planned appearance in March was cancelled after Seth's wife had a baby.
| 357 | April 14, 2016 | Governor John Kasich, David Duchovny, Juliette Lewis | Michelle Wolf |
A Closer Look
| 358 | April 25, 2016 | Keegan-Michael Key & Jordan Peele | Run River North |
A Closer Look, New Campaign Slogans, Keegan-Michael Key & Jordan Peele remind viewers who's who
| 359 | April 26, 2016 | Ricky Gervais, Tituss Burgess, Tony Tulathimutte | N/A |
A Closer Look, Extreme Dog Shaming, Tituss Burgess and Seth have Burgess' wine
| 360 | April 27, 2016 | J. K. Simmons, Caitriona Balfe | The Wild Feathers |
A Closer Look, Back in My Day (with J. K. Simmons)
| 361 | April 28, 2016 | Iggy Azalea, Larry Wilmore | Iggy Azalea |
Lemonade Late Night Aftermath, A Closer Look, Seth Explains Teen Slang (with Iggy Azalea)

=== May ===
| No. | Original release date | Guest(s) | Musical/entertainment guest(s) |
|---|---|---|---|
| 362 | May 2, 2016 | Chadwick Boseman, Carol Kane Vanessa Hudgens MusicalGuests=Mike Posner | |
A Closer Look, MC Glamour
| 363 | May 3, 2016 | Derek Jeter, Elizabeth Olsen, Ron Miscavige | N/A |
A Closer Look
| 364 | May 4, 2016 | Aaron Paul, Gilbert Gottfried, Thomas Kail | N/A |
A Closer Look, Jokes Seth Can't Tell
| 365 | May 5, 2016 | Dana Carvey, Cyndi Lauper | Cyndi Lauper |
A Closer Look
| 366 | May 9, 2016 | Kenan Thompson, Beth Behrs | Thomas Rhett |
A Closer Look, Old Video Games, Kenan Thompson announces David Ortiz's new sponsors
| 367 | May 10, 2016 | Kaley Cuoco, Michael Ian Black, Helen Oyeyemi | N/A |
A Keener Glance, Michael Ian Black brings Seth an outfit for his baby and a book, Venn Diagrams
| 368 | May 11, 2016 | Anderson Cooper, Cush Jumbo | Walk the Moon |
A Closer Look, On the Other Hand
| 369 | May 12, 2016 | Rachel Maddow, Judd Apatow | Joe Pera |
Ya Burnt
| 370 | May 16, 2016 | Connie Britton, Natasha Leggero, Marcus Samuelsson | N/A |
A Closer Look, Diaper Genie
| 371 | May 17, 2016 | The Lonely Island, Greta Gerwig | N/A |
A Closer Look, Second Chance Theatre
| 372 | May 18, 2016 | David Schwimmer, Margaret Cho | Sir the Baptist |
Jokes Seth Can't Tell, David Schwimmer and Seth have wine, Star Wars: Episode I – The Phantom Menace Superfan
| 373 | May 19, 2016 | Zac Efron, Wendy Williams, Eric Ripert | N/A |
A Closer Look
| 374 | May 23, 2016 | Jesse Tyler Ferguson, Governor John Hickenlooper | Bryson Tiller |
A Closer Look, A Message to My Younger Self (Lena Dunham, Anna Wintour, Cyndi Lauper), Extreme Dog Shaming, John Hickenlooper and Seth have beer
| 375 | May 24, 2016 | Emilia Clarke, Darrell Hammond, Geoff Johns | N/A |
A Closer Look, Darrell Hammond does impressions
| 376 | May 25, 2016 | David Spade, Marcia Clark, Noah Hawley | N/A |
Couple Things, Seth highlights staff
| 377 | May 26, 2016 | Sarah Silverman, David Alan Grier | Sheer Mag |
A Closer Look, Under Oath Trailer

=== June ===
| No. | Original release date | Guest(s) | Musical/entertainment guest(s) |
|---|---|---|---|
| 378 | June 6, 2016 | Jesse Eisenberg, Tatiana Maslany, Chuck Klosterman | N/A |
A Closer Look, Hidden Credits
| 379 | June 7, 2016 | Morgan Freeman, Rob Kazinsky | Jake Bugg |
Getting to Know Hillary Clinton, Seth Explains Teen Slang, New Campaign Slogans
| 380 | June 8, 2016 | James Corden, Riley Keough, Frank Rich | N/A |
A Closer Look, James Corden and Seth swap desks, James Corden brings Seth a present for his son
| 381 | June 9, 2016 | Dave Franco, Mary Elizabeth Winstead | Diarrhea Planet |
Ya Burnt, Hillary Clinton Supporters, Seth's opinions on technology, Dave Franco does a card trick
| 382 | June 13, 2016 | Cedric the Entertainer, Ellie Kemper | Kaleo |
Seth acknowledges the Orlando nightclub shooting at the top of the program (A Closer Look), Venn Diagrams
| 383 | June 14, 2016 | Maya Rudolph, Michiel Huisman | Brandy Clark |
A Closer Look (Seth announces for banning Donald Trump appearing on his program), Maya Rudolph and Kenan Thompson sing for Seth's son, Late Night Casserole
| 384 | June 15, 2016 | Martin Short, Ezra Edelman | Fortune Feimster |
Jokes Seth Can't Tell
| 385 | June 16, 2016 | Ed O'Neill, Amber Rose | Justin Flom |
Seth announces NBC offer to Donald Trump, A Closer Look
| 386 | June 20, 2016 | Daniel Radcliffe, Billy Eichner | Band of Skulls |
A Closer Look, The Conservative Perspective
| 387 | June 21, 2016 | Anna Kendrick, Alexander Skarsgård, Giada De Laurentiis | N/A |
A Closer Look, Alexander Skarsgård and Seth re-enact a scene from The Legend of Tarzan, Anniversary Guy Superfan
| 388 | June 22, 2016 | Blake Lively, Finesse Mitchell | A$AP Ferg |
Seth announces NBC offer to Donald Trump, Seth backs up writer for his parents
| 389 | June 23, 2016 | Aubrey Plaza, Samira Wiley, Neil Gaiman | N/A |
A Closer Look, Game of Jones (with Leslie Jones and Kenan Thompson)

=== July ===
| No. | Original release date | Guest(s) | Musical/entertainment guest(s) |
|---|---|---|---|
| 390 | July 11, 2016 | Emma Roberts, Scott Speedman | Gnash |
Fred Armisen's Extremely Accurate TV Recaps, A Closer Look, The Four States of Water
| 391 | July 12, 2016 | Bryan Cranston, Kate McKinnon | The Julie Ruin |
How Hillary Clinton Will Celebrate, Seth acknowledges Dallas police, Seth Explains Teen Slang, Audience member wants to see Bryan Cranston (Bryan Cranston)
| 392 | July 13, 2016 | Bill O'Reilly, Diane Kruger, Riki Lindhome | N/A |
A Closer Look
| 393 | July 14, 2016 | Kristen Wiig, Keke Palmer, Gay Talese | N/A |
A Closer Look, Kristen Wiig gives Seth candy, Seth & Kristen Clear the Air
| 394 | July 18, 2016 | Taylor Schilling, Simon Pegg | Maren Morris |
A Closer Look, Extreme Dog Shaming
| 395 | July 19, 2016 | Michael Strahan, Rami Malek | Alessia Cara |
A Closer Look, Seth promotes Redd's Apple Ale
| 396 | July 20, 2016 | Keegan-Michael Key, Dominic Cooper | Royal Headache |
Seth acknowledges death of Garry Marshall, A Closer Look, Seth plays Pokémon Go
| 397 | July 21, 2016 | Leslie Jones, Carlo Mirarchi | N/A |
Special live episode during the Republican National Convention, RNC Walk–On Music That Should Have Been Used, A Closer Look, Ya Burnt
| 398 | July 25, 2016 | Lenny Kravitz, Rachel Dratch | Yuna |
Getting to Know Tim Kaine, A Closer Look
| 399 | July 26, 2016 | Alicia Vikander, Andy Cohen, Maria Bamford | N/A |
Hey!, Crew Poetry
| 400 | July 27, 2016 | Amy Sedaris, John Cho | Bleached |
A Closer Look, Seth reads affirmations about himself
| 401 | July 28, 2016 | Colin Jost & Michael Che, Jessi Klein | N/A |
Special live episode during the Democratic National Convention, DNC Walk–On Music That Should Have Been Used, A Closer Look, Jokes Seth Can't Tell

=== August ===
| No. | Original release date | Guest(s) | Musical/entertainment guest(s) |
|---|---|---|---|
| 402 | August 1, 2016 | Savannah Guthrie, Shiri Appleby & Constance Zimmer | Brendan Eyre |
A Closer Look, Fred Armisen's Extremely Accurate TV Recaps, Let's Get Specific
| 403 | August 2, 2016 | Craig Robinson, Baz Luhrmann, Yaa Gyasi | N/A |
Seth announces NBC offer to Donald Trump, Fred Armisen's Extremely Accurate TV Recaps
| 404 | August 3, 2016 | Jonah Hill, Jonathan Franzen | Gallant |
Stay Out of It!, Seth Explains Teen Slang, Fred Armisen's Extremely Accurate TV Recaps, Who's That Guy? (appearance by John Carroll Lynch), John Carroll Lynch waits for Seth in his dressing room
| 405 | August 4, 2016 | Blake Shelton, Michael K. Williams | Blake Shelton |
Late Night Pre–Cap, A Closer Look, Fred Armisen's Extremely Accurate TV Recaps, Blake Shelton and Seth have vodka, Blake Shelton gives audience concert tickets
| 406 | August 22, 2016 | Henry Winkler, Grace Gummer | Jon Bellion |
Amber Said What, A Closer Look
| 407 | August 23, 2016 | Bob Costas, Dylan Lauren | N/A |
The Conservative / Progressive Perspective, A Closer Look, Hidden Credits
| 408 | August 24, 2016 | Robert De Niro, Jerome Bettis | Anthrax |
Seth announces NBC offer to Donald Trump, Back in My Day
| 409 | August 25, 2016 | Chelsea Handler, Senator Chuck Schumer | Matteo Lane |
A Closer Look, Ryan Lochte Superfan
| 410 | August 29, 2016 | Michael Moore, Tika Sumpter | Troye Sivan |
Donald Trump's doctor interview, A Closer Look, Late Night B–Plots (appearance by Lenny Kravitz and Rachel Dratch)
| 411 | August 30, 2016 | Sean "Diddy" Combs, DJ Khaled, French Montana, Natasha Lyonne | French Montana |
A Closer Look, Sean "Diddy" Combs, DJ Khaled, French Montana and Seth have liquor
| 412 | August 31, 2016 | Hoda Kotb, Pedro Pascal, Tahereh Mafi | N/A |
Couple Things, Popsicle Schtick

=== September ===
| No. | Original release date | Guest(s) | Musical/entertainment guest(s) |
|---|---|---|---|
| 413 | September 6, 2016 | Steven Tyler, Ali Larter | Steven Tyler |
A Closer Look, Fred Armisen's Extremely Accurate TV Recaps, Nostalgia Corner (Slime by Night, Slap Necklace Commercial, The Real Stretch Armstrong)
| 414 | September 7, 2016 | Jeffrey Tambor, Corey Stoll | Hailee Steinfeld |
A Closer Look, Fred Armisen's Extremely Accurate TV Recaps
| 415 | September 8, 2016 | Molly Shannon, Chris Kelly, Cenk Uygur | N/A |
That Actually Happened, Fred Armisen's Extremely Accurate TV Recaps, Ya Burnt
| 416 | September 9, 2016 | Michelle Obama, Taran Killam & Bobby Moynihan, Corbin Maxey | N/A |
A Closer Look, Seth goes to Howard University with First Lady Michelle Obama, Taran Killam & Bobby Moynihan shoot a video on the Late Night set
| 417 | September 12, 2016 | Victoria Beckham, Jussie Smollett, Colson Whitehead | N/A |
Hey!, NBC's Fact Checkers
| 418 | September 13, 2016 | Bill Hader, Sarah Jones | Test Pattern |
A Closer Look, Seth Explains Teen Slang
| 419 | September 14, 2016 | Joseph Gordon-Levitt, Lewis Black | Calum Scott |
A Closer Look, Gørbøn Hausinfrud
| 420 | September 15, 2016 | Senator Bernie Sanders, Shailene Woodley | Young the Giant |
Dammit!, Shailene Woodley gives Bernie Sanders and Seth T-shirts
| 421 | September 19, 2016 | Ice-T, Clark Gregg | Glass Animals |
A Closer Look, Seth's opinions on ketchup packets
| 422 | September 20, 2016 | James Spader, Jordana Brewster | The Cadillac Three |
A Closer Look, The Cue Card Farm
| 423 | September 21, 2016 | Neil Patrick Harris, Omari Hardwick | James Blake |
A Closer Look, Jokes Seth Can't Tell
| 424 | September 22, 2016 | Chris Pratt, Ben Sinclair & Katja Blichfeld | N/A |
Specific Demographics, Chris Pratt does a card trick, Forced Friendship with Seth & Miley, Extreme Dog Shaming
| 425 | September 26, 2016 | Will Forte, Mandy Moore, David Ortiz | N/A |
Special live episode after First 2016 Presidential Debates, A Closer Look, David Ortiz brings his products, Colin Jost sits on Will Forte
| 426 | September 27, 2016 | Samuel L. Jackson, Cecily Strong, Spike Feresten | N/A |
Hillary Clinton Campaign Ad, A Closer Look
| 427 | September 28, 2016 | January Jones, Mike Colter | Chris Lane |
Amber Ruffin talks about racial injustice, Late Night with Seth Meyers Presidential Debate, Did You Know
| 428 | September 29, 2016 | Justin Theroux, Tim Meadows | Naomi Ekperigin |
A Closer Look, Ya Burnt

=== October ===
| No. | Original release date | Guest(s) | Musical/entertainment guest(s) |
|---|---|---|---|
| 429 | October 3, 2016 | Martha Stewart, Haley Bennett | N/A |
A Closer Look, YouTube Subcommunities
| 430 | October 4, 2016 | Judge Judy Sheindlin, Kelly Clarkson | Tom Odell |
A Closer Look, Seth reads affirmations about himself
| 431 | October 5, 2016 | Chelsea Clinton, Ted Danson | Bishop Briggs |
A Closer Look
| 432 | October 6, 2016 | Ashton Kutcher, Kevin Millar & Sean Casey, Chris Eliopoulos | N/A |
The Conservative Perspective and others, Late Night with Seth Meyers Vice Presidential Debate, Chris Eliopoulos teaches Seth draw Donald Trump
| 433 | October 10, 2016 | Sarah Silverman, Jake Tapper | N/A |
A Closer Look, First Dog Cam, Get to Know Your Monuments
| 434 | October 11, 2016 | Lena Dunham, Nick Kroll & John Mulaney | N/A |
A Closer Look, Seth uses Amazon Echo, Late Night with Seth Meyers Presidential Debate, Get to Know Your Monuments
| 435 | October 12, 2016 | Vice President Joe Biden & Dr. Jill Biden | Sturgill Simpson |
A Closer Look, Seth uses Amazon Echo, Jill Biden brings Seth a stuffed animal for his son, Get to Know Your Monuments
| 436 | October 13, 2016 | Kevin Hart, Secretary of Defense Ash Carter, Senator Al Franken | N/A |
A Closer Look, Seth uses Amazon Echo, Kevin Hart brings Seth headphones, Seth visits The Pentagon, Get to Know Your Monuments
| 437 | October 24, 2016 | Elijah Wood, Ana Gasteyer | Spencer Ludwig |
A Closer Look, Fred Armisen's Extremely Accurate TV Recaps, Ana Gasteyer performed an original song
| 438 | October 25, 2016 | Antonio Brown, Graydon Carter, Pete Davidson | Lucius |
Late Night with Seth Meyers Presidential Debate, Antonio Brown gives Seth a laptop
| 439 | October 26, 2016 | Kate Beckinsale, Colin Hanks | N/A |
A Closer Look, Jokes Seth Can't Tell, Extreme Dog Shaming
| 440 | October 27, 2016 | Joel Edgerton, Evan Rachel Wood, Ina Garten | N/A |
Hillary Clinton's Birthday Wishes, A Closer Look
| 441 | October 31, 2016 | Nathan Lane, Genevieve Angelson, Matt Zoller Seitz & Alan Sepinwall | N/A |
A Closer Look, Nathan Lane reads schedule for Trump TV

=== November ===
| No. | Original release date | Guest(s) | Musical/entertainment guest(s) |
|---|---|---|---|
| 442 | November 1, 2016 | Common, Pamela Adlon | John Prine with Iris DeMent |
A Closer Look, Hidden Credits
| 443 | November 2, 2016 | Christian Slater, Priyanka Chopra, Luke Bracey | N/A |
Amber Says What, A Closer Look
| 444 | November 3, 2016 | Vince Vaughn, George Stephanopoulos | Liza Treyger |
A Closer Look, Seth's nephew Derrick
| 445 | November 7, 2016 | John Goodman, Andrew Rannells | The 1975 |
A Closer Look, Seth and Andrew Rannells have a drink, The Wrong Take
| 446 | November 9, 2016 | Wendy Williams, Chris Hayes | Lukas Graham |
NBC's offer to Donald Trump, Wendy Williams and Seth go through her vocabulary, Wendy Williams and Seth switch places
| 447 | November 10, 2016 | Lester Holt, Alia Shawkat, Jade Chang | N/A |
Amber Ruffin gives a message, Seth Explains Teen Slang, Alia Shawkat performed "Trouble in Mind", Gene the Cameraman tells a bedtime story
| 448 | November 14, 2016 | Aaron Eckhart, Michelle Dockery | Margo Price |
A Closer Look, Back in My Day
| 449 | November 15, 2016 | Billy Bob Thornton, Lily Collins, Dr. Sanjay Gupta | N/A |
A Closer Look
| 450 | November 16, 2016 | Kathy Bates, Laura Jane Grace | Against Me! |
Ya Burnt, Live Ad
| 451 | November 17, 2016 | Casey Affleck, Rebecca Romijn, Michael Che | N/A |
8 Jokes About Mike Pence's Selfie, A Closer Look
| 452 | November 21, 2016 | Kathy Griffin, Dev Patel, Chef José Andrés | N/A |
Good News, A Closer Look, Fred Armisen's Extremely Accurate TV Recaps
| 453 | November 22, 2016 | Gayle King, Ben Platt | Dear Evan Hansen |
A Closer Look, Fred Armisen's Extremely Accurate TV Recaps, Gayle King brings Seth wine, Popsicle Schtick
| 454 | November 23, 2016 | Curtis "50 Cent" Jackson, Katy Tur | K. Flay |
A Closer Look, Seth & Fred Clear the Air
| 455 | November 24, 2016 | Josh Meyers, Larry Meyers and Hilary Meyers | N/A |
Seth Explains Teen Slang: Thanksgiving Edition, Seth's opinions on Thanksgiving's proximity to Christmas, How Well Do You Know Your Meyers? (How Well Do You Know Your Ashes?), Seth gives thanks

=== December ===
| No. | Original release date | Guest(s) | Musical/entertainment guest(s) |
|---|---|---|---|
| 456 | December 5, 2016 | Kate McKinnon, Benjamin Bratt | The Hold Steady |
A Closer Look
| 457 | December 6, 2016 | Shaquille O'Neal, Abbi Jacobson | Miranda Lambert |
Jokes Seth Can't Tell, Extreme Dog Shaming
| 458 | December 7, 2016 | Michael Moore, Rita Ora | Kacey Musgraves |
Hey!, Joke Bucket
| 459 | December 8, 2016 | Taraji P. Henson, Lola Kirke, Bret Baier | N/A |
A Closer Look, Late Night Actathalon (Taraji P. Henson)
| 460 | December 12, 2016 | Julie Chen, Billie Lourd, Maureen Dowd | N/A |
A Closer Look
| 461 | December 13, 2016 | Senator Bernie Sanders, Zoey Deutch | Dan Levy |
A Closer Look
| 462 | December 14, 2016 | Mindy Kaling, Eric McCormack, Joe Pera | N/A |
Late Night Casserole, Back in My Day (Mindy Kaling), Joe Pera brings out a plaque
| 463 | December 15, 2016 | Mariah Carey, Colin Quinn | Megadeth |
Ya Burnt, Seth interviews Mariah Carey on the sleigh, Two Elves
| 464 | December 19, 2016 | Sarah Paulson, Taran Killam & Marc Andreyko | Tori Kelly |
A Closer Look, Fred Armisen's Extremely Accurate TV Recaps, Hidden Credits
| 465 | December 20, 2016 | Michael Fassbender, David Remnick | N/A |
Tweetin' with the Prez, Fred Armisen's Extremely Accurate TV Recaps, Amber Says What, The Late Night Players perform The New Yorker cartoons
| 466 | December 21, 2016 | Rachel Maddow, Kelly Osbourne | N/A |
A Closer Look, Seth promotes the LG V20, Fred Armisen's Extremely Accurate TV Recaps, Crew Poetry
| 467 | December 22, 2016 | Matthew McConaughey, Mel B, Cameron Dallas | N/A |
Seth Explains Teen Slang: Holiday Edition, Fred Armisen's Extremely Accurate TV Recaps, Skeptic on a Stick Commercial
| Special | December 31, 2016 | Jennifer Lawrence, Arnold Schwarzenegger, Leslie Jones | Kelly Clarkson |
A Closer Look Back at 2016, Jennifer Lawrence and Seth have wine, Arnold Schwarzenegger's New Year's Eve Bash, New Year's Resolutions (Shaquille O'Neal, Kate McKinnon), Leslie Jones and Seth have a drink, Would You Kiss at Midnight? (Leslie Jones)
