= List of Late Night with Seth Meyers episodes (2015) =

- No. of episodes: 161

Release
- Original network: NBC

Season chronology
- ← Previous; 2014 episodes Next → 2016 episodes

This is the list of episodes for Late Night with Seth Meyers in 2015.

== 2015 ==
=== January ===
No.	Original release date	Guest(s)	Musical/entertainment guest(s)
144	January 5, 2015	Anna Kendrick, Timothy Spall, Martha Stewart	N/A
Conner O'Malley protests Seth, Seth wishes viewers a happy birthday and sends a message to his neighbor
145	January 6, 2015	Jessica Lange, Molly Sims, Maya Rudolph, Men in Blazers	N/A
Joke Bucket
146	January 7, 2015	Jane Lynch, Lucy Hale	Haerts
Couple Things, Original Titles
147	January 8, 2015	Matt LeBlanc, Patton Oswalt	N/A
January Carols, Distinguished Guests (Matt LeBlanc sits in the audience)
148	January 12, 2015	Kristin Chenoweth, Casey Wilson, Tony Danza	Brandy Clark
Venn Diagrams, Seth gives Casey Wilson a present, Tony Danza sings Seth a birthday rap
149	January 13, 2015	Michael Strahan, Olivia Munn, Mark and Jay Duplass	N/A
Fake or Florida
150	January 14, 2015	President Bill Clinton, Carrie Brownstein	Mali Music
Seth acknowledges first printing of Charlie Hebdo since the January 7 shootings, Last Line of the News Story
151	January 15, 2015	Kristen Stewart, Andrew Rannells	Phoebe Robinson
Ya Burnt
152	January 19, 2015	Don Cheadle, Ruth Wilson	Night Terrors of 1927
Extreme Dog Shaming, Seth gets his computer password changed
153	January 20, 2015	Lauren Graham, Rainn Wilson, Brian Michael Bendis	N/A
Back in My Day, Rainn Wilson's birthday, Rainn Wilson imitates Chewbacca
154	January 21, 2015	Jennifer Lopez, Nick Kroll	Lupe Fiasco
How They Reported It, Seth promotes Nissan and talks about his father, Seth's opinions on the moon
155	January 22, 2015	Felicity Jones, Hines Ward	Sebastian Maniscalco
Seth reads affirmations about himself, Tony Tempo, Seth wears Super Bowl rings

=== February ===
No.	Original release date	Guest(s)	Musical/entertainment guest(s)
156	February 2, 2015	John Oliver, Mike Greenberg	Kid Ink
You Be the Ref, Super Bowl Wrap-Up, New Slogans
157	February 3, 2015	Debra Messing, Horatio Sanz, Mario Batali	N/A
The Sticking Point, Famous Quote First Drafts
158	February 4, 2015	Glenn Close, Gabrielle Union	J Mascis
Ham Radio, Glenn Close reads Bob Balaban's lymric
159	February 5, 2015	David Duchovny, Candice Swanepoel and Lily Aldridge, Brooks Wheelan	N/A
Ya Burnt, Candice Swanepoel and Lily Aldridge give Seth a present for his wife, Seth gives Brooks Wheelan a six-pack
160	February 9, 2015	Bobby Moynihan, Eugene and Dan Levy	The Bots
What New Yorkers have to say about Fifty Shades of Grey, Venn Diagrams, Dan Levy does an impression of his father
161	February 10, 2015	Julian Edelman, Tracee Ellis Ross, Brian Koppelman	N/A
Least Trending Twitter Topics, Inventor Spotlight, Julian Edelman gives Seth a present
162	February 11, 2015	William H. Macy, Kenny Smith	The Districts
Seth reads passages from Fifty Shades Married, Seth's nephew Derrick
163	February 12, 2015	Kevin Costner, Portia de Rossi, David Frei	N/A
Mind the Gaffe, This Week in Numbers, Conner O'Malley's episode of The Blacklist
164	February 16, 2015	Wanda Sykes, Angie Harmon	Two Gallants
Seth reminisces about the Saturday Night Live 40th anniversary special after party, The Beatdown, Original Titles
165	February 17, 2015	Matthew Perry, Taraji P. Henson, Anders Holm	N/A
Joke Bucket
166	February 18, 2015	Kathy Griffin, Peter Sarsgaard	The Mavericks
Seth congratulates Jimmy Fallon on one-year Tonight Show anniversary, Seth asks people to donate to Cycle for Survival, Heyday
167	February 19, 2015	Zachary Quinto, Mae Whitman, Carolina Herrera	N/A
Seth gives update on Cycle for Survival donations, Seth checks out the New York Toy Fair, Hidden Credits
168	February 23, 2015	Mary J. Blige, Stephen Amell	MisterWives
Seth gives update on Cycle for Survival donations, Couple Things, Venn Diagrams
169	February 24, 2015	The Cast of Parks and Recreation	N/A
Seth acknowledges one-year anniversary, Ya Burnt, the cast of Parks and Recreation sing one-year anniversary song, the cast of Parks and Recreation toast each other
170	February 25, 2015	Christina Aguilera, Colin Quinn	Kurt Braunohler
Seth gives update on Cycle for Survival donations, Old Video Games, Christina Aguilera does impression of Kim Cattrall, Colin Quinn's jokes
171	February 26, 2015	Will Forte, Ellie Kemper	Sleater-Kinney
New Slogans

=== March ===
No.	Original release date	Guest(s)	Musical/entertainment guest(s)
172	March 2, 2015	Kelly Ripa, Lee Daniels	Echosmith
Seth gives update on Cycle for Survival donations, A Closer Look, Last Line of the News Story
173	March 3, 2015	Tom Selleck, Anne Heche, Marlon James	N/A
Stink Mouth Pig Man
174	March 4, 2015	Kenneth Branagh, Felicity Huffman	Purity Ring
Seth Explains Teen Slang, Grandma
175	March 5, 2015	Jada Pinkett Smith, Ginnifer Goodwin, Robert Smigel	N/A
Seth gives update on Cycle for Survival donations, A Late Night Writer Pitches Seth a Sketch, New Sponsors
176	March 16, 2015	Keri Russell, Senator Ted Cruz	Smallpools
Seth's audio clip, Venn Diagrams
177	March 17, 2015	Shailene Woodley, Jason Biggs, Alex Gibney	N/A
Famous Quote First Drafts, Late Night Group Poetry
178	March 18, 2015	Lena Dunham, Erin Andrews	Tove Styrke
Seth Does St. Patrick's Day (Potato of Truth)
179	March 19, 2015	Jay Leno, Sara and Erin Foster	Seaton Smith
Ya Burnt
180	March 23, 2015	Jesse Tyler Ferguson, Christina Hendricks	Charles Hamilton & Rita Ora
2015 LNSM Tournament of Things, 3 Questions with Amber and Michelle, Conner O'Malley gives the gist on news
181	March 24, 2015	Ben Stiller, Elisha Cuthbert, Chris Hayes	N/A
2015 LNSM Tournament of Things, Opening Packages, Seth quizzes Ben Stiller on Beastie Boys song lyrics, Epilogues
182	March 25, 2015	Jeremy Piven, David Benioff and Dan Weiss	Marina and the Diamonds
2015 LNSM Tournament of Things, Seth and Frisbee Visit Dog Psychics, Celebrity Spelling Bee
183	March 26, 2015	Kelsey Grammer, Paula Pell, Sesame Street's The Count	N/A
2015 LNSM Tournament of Things, Seth reads affirmations about himself, This Week in Numbers (appearance by The Count)
184	March 30, 2015	Nathan Lane, Kristen Schaal	BØRNS
2015 LNSM Tournament of Things, Couple Things, Extreme Dog Shaming
185	March 31, 2015	Kevin Bacon, Chris D'Elia, Éric Ripert	N/A
2015 LNSM Tournament of Things, Back in My Day

=== April ===
No.	Original release date	Guest(s)	Musical/entertainment guest(s)
186	April 1, 2015	Chris "Ludacris" Bridges, Charlie Cox	Dead Sara
Seth wishes his wife a happy birthday, 2015 LNSM Tournament of Things, Will They or Won't They?, New Slogans
187	April 2, 2015	Jesse Eisenberg Vanessa Hudgens, Rob Huebel MusicalGuests=Years & Years	
2015 LNSM Tournament of Things, Robert and Sal: Friends Forever, Ya Burnt
188	April 6, 2015	Kit Harington, Adam Horovitz	The Mountain Goats
2015 LNSM Tournament of Things, Hold the Sausage, Jon Snow at Seth's dinner party, Seth quizzes Adam Horovitz on Ben Stiller film titles
189	April 7, 2015	Jon Cryer, Kat Dennings, Michael Chernow and Daniel Holzman	N/A
2015 LNSM Tournament of Things, Venn Diagrams, CJ 1000 (Late Night Visits a Robot Competition)
190	April 8, 2015	Pharrell Williams, Oscar Isaac	Delta Rae
Original Titles, Ham Radio
191	April 9, 2015	Taraji P. Henson, Carice van Houten	Keith Alberstadt
Deep Google
192	April 20, 2015	Helen Mirren, Lindsey Vonn	Buzzcocks
Live Free or Die Tryin', Hidden Credits
193	April 21, 2015	Ethan Hawke, Kumail Nanjiani	Dwight Yoakam
Seth and His Father-in-Law Go to the Auto Show, Least Trending Twitter Topics
194	April 22, 2015	Blake Lively, Gina Rodriguez	Jessie Baylin
Seth promotes Cuervo hashtag contest, Seth Visits Yankee Stadium
195	April 23, 2015	Russell Crowe, Seann William Scott	Emily Heller
A Closer Look, Ya Burnt, Seth imitates Russell Crowe, Russell Crowe brings Seth a hat
196	April 27, 2015	James Spader, Jane Krakowski	The Wombats
Venn Diagrams, Jane Krakowski brings Seth a crochet puppet of himself, Seth's opinions on sommeliers
197	April 28, 2015	John Cleese, Linda Cardellini, Barney Frank	N/A
Last Line of the News Story
198	April 29, 2015	Chelsea Handler, John Slattery	Shakey Graves
Avengers: Age of Ultron trailer, Blacklist: Cyber Edition
199	April 30, 2015	Cobie Smulders, Andre Braugher	Phil Hanley
Adventures in Twitter, Scoot, This Week in Numbers

=== May ===
No.	Original release date	Guest(s)	Musical/entertainment guest(s)
200	May 4, 2015	Lily Tomlin, Abigail Breslin	Chris Distefano
Extreme Dog Shaming (Twitter Question of the Week), Old Video Games
201	May 5, 2015	Jack Black, Carly Fiorina, Pedro Martínez	N/A
Seth the Snoop (with Jack Black)
202	May 6, 2015	Anna Wintour, Willie Nelson	Twin Shadow
Seth Explains Teen Slang, Anna Wintour: Comedy Icon
203	May 7, 2015	Josh Hartnett, Mika Brzezinski and Joe Scarborough	Benjamin Booker
Knicks City Dunces, Ya Burnt
204	May 11, 2015	Louis C.K., Sharon Osbourne	Joy Williams
The Best of Next Week on Mad Men, Helpful Memes If You're on the Fence About Joining Isis
205	May 12, 2015	Jane Fonda, Leslie Jones, Kay Cannon	N/A
Venn Diagrams, Opening Packages
206	May 13, 2015	Matt Dillon, Tatiana Maslany	Will Butler
Softball Practice, Back in My Day, Cut for Air
207	May 14, 2015	Anna Kendrick, Thomas Middleditch, Tom Scharpling and Jon Wurster	N/A
Fake or Florida, Pitch Perfect 2 soundtrack giveaway
208	May 18, 2015	Mariska Hargitay, Chelsea Peretti	Father John Misty
Actors Angrily Swiping Things Off Desks, Sunday Catch-Up, Seth promotes T-Mobile, New Slogans
209	May 19, 2015	Eric Stonestreet, Mike Epps	Nick Swardson
Late Night with David Letterman cold open, Seth acknowledges David Letterman, Seth's opinions on Netflix
210	May 20, 2015	Dwyane Wade, Kellan Lutz	Allen Stone
Service men and women sit in the audience, Trade Talk, This Week in Numbers
211	May 21, 2015	Heidi Klum, Richard Lewis, Matt Fraction	N/A
Service men and women sit in the audience, NBC programs repurposed, Ya Burnt, Heidi Klum brings Seth a kangaroo scrotum bottle opener, Matt Fraction reads sex advice

=== June ===
No.	Original release date	Guest(s)	Musical/entertainment guest(s)
212	June 1, 2015	Rose Byrne, Senator Bernie Sanders	Brett Eldredge
A Closer Look, Venn Diagrams, Rose Byrne does an impression of a Tasmanian devil
213	June 2, 2015	Melissa McCarthy, Robert Duvall, Hanya Yanagihara	N/A
Couple Things, Crew Poetry
214	June 3, 2015	Alan Cumming, Alicia Vikander	Clean Bandit and Jess Glynne
Least Trending Twitter Topics, Alan Cumming does "It's Saturday Night on Broadway" video, Seth's assistant is a robot
215	June 4, 2015	Elisabeth Moss, Cat Deeley	Gina Brillon
What Took You So Long?, Jeremy Driscoll
216	June 8, 2015	Edie Falco, George Wallace	Fall Out Boy
Monday Catch-Up, Ideas for American Pharoah sketch (What Do Horses Think of American Pharoah's Triple Crown Win?), George Wallace's jokes, George Wallace's tweets
217	June 9, 2015	Jerry Seinfeld, David Remnick	N/A
The Late Night Players perform The New Yorker cartoons
218	June 10, 2015	Taran Killam, Hugh Dancy	Kacey Musgraves
Last Line of the News Story, Taran Killam does an impression of Michael Keaton, Bad Sponsors
219	June 11, 2015	Molly Shannon, T.I., Matt Lucas	N/A
Seth acknowledges death of Vincent Musetto, Ya Burnt
220	June 15, 2015	Martha Stewart, Laura Prepon	Jamie xx
Angela Morrison, Venn Diagrams
221	June 16, 2015	Amanda Seyfried, Judd Apatow, Katie Lee	N/A
Seth breaks down Donald Trump presidential candidacy announcement, Deep Google
222	June 17, 2015	Mindy Kaling, Adam Scott	Tove Lo
Seth Explains Teen Slang, Seth's opinions on nuts
223	June 18, 2015	Taylor Schilling, James Taylor	James Taylor
Seth writes campaign song for Donald Trump, This Week in Numbers
224	June 22, 2015	Maya Rudolph, Joe Manganiello	Belle and Sebastian
Maya Rudolph plays Rachel Dolezal, Maya Rudolph sings a song, Seth forgets to mention something
225	June 23, 2015	Colin Farrell, Matt Bomer, Maria Bartiromo	N/A
Seth & Josh: Day Drink in Brooklyn
226	June 24, 2015	Channing Tatum, Laverne Cox	Desaparecidos
Really!?! with Seth & Amy, Extreme Dog Shaming (Twitter Question of the Week)
227	June 25, 2015	Seth MacFarlane, Bella Thorne, Greg Poehler	N/A
Conner O'Malley supports Donald Trump (Talking Trump 2016), Bella Thorne and Seth take a selfie, Scoot

=== July ===
No.	Original release date	Guest(s)	Musical/entertainment guest(s)
228	July 13, 2015	Michael Douglas, Jim Gaffigan	Nate Ruess
The Last Week of News, Terminator
229	July 14, 2015	Ben Kingsley, Mike Birbiglia, Senator Lindsey Graham	N/A
Hidden Credits
230	July 15, 2015	Paul Rudd, Paula Pell and James Anderson	N/A
Back in My Day, Paul Rudd fan (Paul Rudd), Paula Pell shows hidden talents, Paula Pell & James Anderson performed country song
231	July 16, 2015	Amy Schumer, Pablo Schreiber	Anderson East
Up S#!'s Greek, Pablo Schreiber brings Seth argon oil, Michelle Wolf talks about sports players
232	July 20, 2015	Ryan Seacrest, Vanessa Bayer, Chris Gethard	N/A
Venn Diagrams, Vanessa Bayer does impression of her telling sex jokes, Seth's opinions on the Cloud
233	July 21, 2015	Adam Sandler, Margaret Cho	Modest Mouse
Seth Explains Teen Slang
234	July 22, 2015	Rachel Maddow, Cara Delevingne	Neon Trees
New Slogans, Millennial Owl
235	July 23, 2015	Jake Gyllenhaal, Ashley Benson, The Yes Men	N/A
If Donald Trump Was Elected, Jake Gyllenhaal forgets his phone, Ya Burnt
236	July 27, 2015	Matt Lauer and Savannah Guthrie, Carli Lloyd	Lord Huron
Seth wishes viewers a happy birthday and sends a message to his neighbor, New Sponsors
237	July 28, 2015	Billy Eichner and Julie Klausner, Joel Edgerton	Vintage Trouble
Last Line of the News Story, Audience Weird Guy
238	July 29, 2015	Ed Helms, Alison Bechdel	Fun Home
Crew Poetry
239	July 30, 2015	Christine Baranski, Colin Jost	Michael Kosta
New England Scram Chowder

=== August ===
No.	Original release date	Guest(s)	Musical/entertainment guest(s)
240	August 3, 2015	Miles Teller, Jessica St. Clair and Lennon Parham	Christine and the Queens
HitchBot Audio, Free Rick Perry, Fortune Cookie or True Detective
241	August 4, 2015	Craig Robinson, Michael Ian Black, Christina Tosi	N/A
Emergency Joke, This Week in Numbers (Twitter Question of the Week), Craig Robinson performed "Chocolate Muffins"
242	August 5, 2015	Jason Segel, Michael B. Jordan	Big Sean
Venn Diagrams, Conner O'Malley talks about the Republican debate (Debate the Trump, Chumps Stump the Trump)
243	August 6, 2015	Ice-T and Coco, Lucy Hale, Andy Daly	N/A
Ya Burnt
244	August 10, 2015	Winona Ryder, Colin Quinn	Beirut
The Gift That Keeps on Giving Women the Creeps, New Slogans
245	August 11, 2015	Anderson Cooper, Greta Gerwig, Tig Notaro	N/A
Donald Trump Discussion, Seth Explains Teen Slang
246	August 12, 2015	Connie Britton, Rita Ora	Unknown Mortal Orchestra
Seth and Josh: New Sibling Auditions
247	August 13, 2015	Kristen Wiig, Tituss Burgess, David Simon	N/A
Back in My Day, Kristen Wiig and Fred Armisen dub Late Night
248	August 17, 2015	Bill Hader, Shepard Smith	Blue Jean Committee
Monday Catch-Up, Stoned Vanessa Bayer
249	August 18, 2015	Zac Efron, Joe Piscopo	Chris Stapleton
Extreme Dog Shaming (Twitter Question of the Week), Seth reads Zac Efron poem
250	August 19, 2015	Keegan-Michael Key, Tony Hale	MS MR
Deep Google, One O'Clock in the Morning
251	August 20, 2015	Matthew Broderick, John Cena, Impractical Jokers	N/A
What Donald Trump Learned from Wrestling, Ya Burnt, Seth returns John Cena's wallet

=== September ===
No.	Original release date	Guest(s)	Musical/entertainment guest(s)
252	September 8, 2015	Tina Fey, Nick Jonas	Nick Jonas
Hillary Clin-tron: Tech Genius
253	September 9, 2015	Craig Ferguson, Gabourey Sidibe	Clayton English
Solamente Inglés, Seth & Mom Go Drinking
254	September 10, 2015	Neil Patrick Harris, Bill de Blasio	Panic! at the Disco
Hillary Clinton Campaign Ad, Rally!?! with Trump & Palin, Late Night Actathalon (Neil Patrick Harris), Bill de Blasio Public Service Announcement
255	September 11, 2015	Andy Samberg, Kevin Love, M. Night Shyamalan	N/A
Ya Burnt, Seth gets a lightsaber, Andy Samberg practices pronouncing celebrities' names, Kevin Love gives fashion advice to other players, Seth is actually on Late Night with M. Night Shyamalan
256	September 14, 2015	Jason Sudeikis, David Oyelowo	Twenty One Pilots
Misblaken Identity, Extreme Dog Shaming
257	September 15, 2015	Josh Brolin, Martin O'Malley, Judd Winick	N/A
Debate Prep, Back in My Day (Josh Brolin)
258	September 16, 2015	Elijah Wood, Horatio Sanz	Jess Glynne
Seth Explains Teen Slang, Would Elijah Wood, Horatio Sanz draws on The Awesomes poster, Horatio Sanz goes through cards in his wallet, Horatio Sanz does impressions of presidential candidates
259	September 17, 2015	Carol Burnett, Colin Hanks	Baio
Debate Wrap-Up, New Slogans
260	September 18, 2015	Ed Burns, Richard Kind, Judy Blume	N/A
Venn Diagrams, Fake trailer for The Martian, Judy Blume gives Seth's crew advice
261	September 21, 2015	Wesley Snipes, Randall Park, Martha Stewart	N/A
Justin Timberlake writes Late Night theme
262	September 22, 2015	Patrick Stewart, Governor John Kasich, Michael Irvin	George Ezra
A Closer Look
263	September 23, 2015	Will Forte, Natasha Lyonne	N/A
Last Line of the News Story, Bad Sponsors, Will Forte performed karaoke version of "He Ain't Heavy, He's My Brother", Seth & Will Clear the Air
264	September 24, 2015	Anne Hathaway, Ben McKenzie, Francis Garcia and Sal Basille	N/A
Ya Burnt, Seth wants to ask Anne Hathaway a question
265	September 28, 2015	Cindy Crawford, Chiwetel Ejiofor	Awolnation
Bye Bye Boehner, Seth wishes viewers a happy birthday and sends a message to his neighbor
266	September 29, 2015	Kenan Thompson, Maura Tierney, Chef John Besh	N/A
This Week in Numbers (Twitter Question of the Week), Kenan Thompson brings Seth a photo, 3 Memes and a Gif (Kenan Thompson)
267	September 30, 2015	Robert De Niro, Judy Greer	Highly Suspect
A Closer Look, Robert De Niro delivers lines in drama and comedy, Conner O'Malley's episode of The Blacklist

=== October ===
No.	Original release date	Guest(s)	Musical/entertainment guest(s)
268	October 1, 2015	Elliot Page, Ken Jeong, Junot Díaz	N/A
Demo-panic Party, Scoot
269	October 5, 2015	Idris Elba, Tony Goldwyn, Pete Davidson	N/A
A Closer Look, Fred Armisen's Extremely Accurate TV Recaps, Venn Diagrams
270	October 6, 2015	Rooney Mara, Paul Reiser	Adam Lambert
Hidden Credits, Gørbøn Hausinfrud
271	October 7, 2015	Joel McHale, Sara Bareilles	Sara Bareilles
A Closer Look, Seth Explains Teen Slang
272	October 8, 2015	Ted Danson, Kevin Millar and Sean Casey, Robert Kirkman	N/A
Ya Burnt, Is There a Speaker in the House?
273	October 12, 2015	Olivia Wilde, Grant Gustin	The Vamps
A Closer Look, Fred Armisen's Extremely Accurate TV Recaps, Late Night Actathalon (Olivia Wilde)
274	October 13, 2015	Sophia Bush, Josh Meyers	Craig Finn
Seth discusses how much his eyes hurt after last night's sketch with Olivia Wilde, Seth's opinions on serving sizes, Fred Armisen's Extremely Accurate TV Recaps, Seth Goes to Comic Con
275	October 14, 2015	Kate Winslet, Mia Wasikowska, Chris Matthews	N/A
The Overcompens-Debate, Fred Armisen's Extremely Accurate TV Recaps, Gravi-Toss
276	October 15, 2015	Zooey Deschanel, Dominic West, Nathan Fielder	N/A
This Week in Numbers, Fred Armisen's Extremely Accurate TV Recaps, Adult Scary Stories with Zooey & Seth!, Nathan Fielder brings Seth money
277	October 26, 2015	Clive Owen, Rachel Dratch, Tim Gunn	N/A
A Closer Look, Seth & Rachel Clear the Air
278	October 27, 2015	Blake Shelton, Eve Hewson	Blake Shelton
Extreme Dog Shaming (Twitter Question of the Week), The Matrix Reloaded Superfan
279	October 28, 2015	Mike Piazza, Steven Wright, Lauren Groff	N/A
A Closer Look, Deep Google
280	October 29, 2015	Sean "Diddy" Combs, Jaimie Alexander	Gary Clark, Jr.
Debate Wrap-Up, Sean "Diddy" Combs debuts new vodka flavor, Seth's stepson Derrick

=== November ===
No.	Original release date	Guest(s)	Musical/entertainment guest(s)
281	November 2, 2015	Jon Hamm, Jalen Rose	Bryan Adams
A Closer Look, Venn Diagrams, Robert Friend Commercial
282	November 3, 2015	Allison Janney, Hunter Parrish, Men in Blazers	N/A
Seth Explains Teen Slang, Seth's opinions on the flu vaccine
283	November 4, 2015	Ralph Fiennes, Dr. Jill Biden	Against Me!
A Closer Look, Last Line of the News Story
284	November 5, 2015	Daniel Craig, Regina King, Donny Deutsch	N/A
A Closer Look, Back in My Day
285	November 9, 2015	Kathy Griffin, Paul Bettany, Ta-Nehisi Coates	N/A
A Closer Look, New Slogans, Seth reads angry tweets
286	November 10, 2015	Rainn Wilson, Elizabeth Hurley	Seal
Crew Poetry, Rainn Wilson thanks best friend, Rainn Wilson and Seth drown each other out
287	November 11, 2015	Adam Levine, Bethenny Frankel	Alessia Cara
Seth thanks service men and women, Debate Wrap-Up, Classified Information
288	November 12, 2015	Sam Rockwell, Cristin Milioti, Neil Cavuto	N/A
Ya Burnt, Seth debates the pronunciation of the word "homage"
289	November 16, 2015	Seth Rogen, Leslie Odom, Jr.	Travis Scott
Seth acknowledges the November 2015 Paris attacks, A Closer Look, Fred Armisen's Extremely Accurate TV Recaps
290	November 17, 2015	Viola Davis, Allison Tolman, The Scottos	N/A
Hidden Credits, Fred Armisen's Extremely Accurate TV Recaps, Late Night with Seth Meyers Republican Presidential Debate
291	November 18, 2015	Liam Hemsworth, John Mulaney	Mutemath
A Closer Look, Fred Armisen's Extremely Accurate TV Recaps, Late Night Casserole (Wheel of Fortune Before and After Dark)
292	November 19, 2015	Josh Hutcherson, Jennifer Carpenter, Michael Rezendes and Sacha Pfeiffer	N/A
This Week in Numbers (Twitter Question of the Week), Fred Armisen's Extremely Accurate TV Recaps, Late Breaking Story
293	November 23, 2015	Governor Sarah Palin, David Tennant, Holly Holm	Spring Awakening
Debut of new opening titles, Christianity Test, Venn Diagrams
294	November 24, 2015	America Ferrera, Oliver Platt, Judah Friedlander	N/A
A Closer Look, Old Video Games
295	November 25, 2015	Matthew Morrison, Uzo Aduba	A Great Big World
Seth Explains Teen Slang, Promo for P. C. Richard & Son Alternative Thanksgiving Day Parade
296	November 26, 2015	Josh Meyers, Larry Meyers and Hillary Meyers	N/A
Ya Burnt: Thanksgiving Edition, Extreme Dog Shaming, How Well Do You Know Your Meyers?, Seth gives thanks

=== December ===
No.	Original release date	Guest(s)	Musical/entertainment guest(s)
297	December 7, 2015	Shaquille O'Neal, Judith Light, Mike O'Brien	N/A
A Closer Look, Fred Armisen's Extremely Accurate TV Recaps
298	December 8, 2015	Jason Schwartzman, Michelle Dockery	Elle King
A Closer Look, Fred Armisen's Extremely Accurate TV Recaps, Jason Schwartzman plays drums out to commercial, Venn Diagrams
299	December 9, 2015	Adam Driver, Jesse Plemons	Aretha Franklin
New Slogans, New Campaign Slogans, Fred Armisen's Extremely Accurate TV Recaps
300	December 10, 2015	Hillary Clinton, Samantha Bee	Andrea Bocelli
Seth's opinions on Secret Santa, Seth's gives Hillary Clinton a quiz on New Hampshire
301	December 14, 2015	Bradley Cooper, Jemaine Clement	The Struts
A Closer Look, Seth faces holiday characters
302	December 15, 2015	Jennifer Lawrence, Kurt Russell, Fred Noe	N/A
We Also Would've Accepted, IBM Commercials
303	December 16, 2015	Quentin Tarantino, Nick Kroll & John Mulaney	Moon Taxi
Debate Wrap-Up, Gørbøn Hausinfrud
304	December 17, 2015	Tina Fey, Amy Poehler, Ike Barinholtz, Maya Rudolph, Rachel Dratch, Paula Pell	N/A
Seth Explains Teen Slang, Fred Armisen's Extremely Accurate TV Recaps, the cast of Sisters sell the film with Star Wars characters, the cast reads passages from Paula Pell's journal
