= List of Late Night with Seth Meyers episodes (2017) =

- No. of episodes: 163

Release
- Original network: NBC

Season chronology
- ← Previous; 2016 episodes Next → 2018 episodes

This is the list of episodes for Late Night with Seth Meyers in 2017.

== 2017 ==
=== January ===
No.	Original release date	Guest(s)	Musical/entertainment guest(s)
468	January 9, 2017	Jason Sudeikis, Michelle Monaghan, Van Jones	N/A
A Closer Look
469	January 10, 2017	Ken Jeong, Kellyanne Conway, Michael Schur	N/A
A Closer Look
470	January 11, 2017	Andrew Garfield, Mary Steenburgen	Colony House
Couple Things, Let's Get Specific
471	January 12, 2017	Jude Law, Sullivan Stapleton, Action Bronson	N/A
A Closer Look, Point Counterpoint
472	January 16, 2017	Jake Tapper, B. J. Novak, Steve Jones	N/A
A Closer Look, Bad Sponsors
473	January 17, 2017	Aidy Bryant, Patrick Warburton	Bibi Bourelly
A Closer Look, Seth reads his New Year's resolutions
474	January 18, 2017	Michael Keaton, Emily Deschanel, Neal Brennan	N/A
Amber Says What, Michael Keaton sits in the audience, Michael Keaton gives Seth a Pittsburgh Steelers hat
475	January 19, 2017	Jim Parsons, Ben McKenzie, Jon Favreau & Dan Pheiffer	N/A
A Closer Look, Late Night writers protest Donald Trump
476	January 23, 2017	Idina Menzel, Melissa Benoist	Kane Brown
A Closer Look, Seth's opinions on TV series recommendations
477	January 24, 2017	Andy Cohen, Retta, Ta-Nehisi Coates	N/A
Hey!, Jokes Seth Can't Tell, Seth & Retta Go Day Drinking
478	January 25, 2017	Katie Couric, Bryce Dallas Howard, Matt Taibbi	N/A
A Closer Look, Old Video Games
479	January 26, 2017	Timothy Olyphant, Lili Reinhart & Camila Mendes	Nelly Furtado
A Closer Look, Timothy Olyphant's suggestions for his intro, Late Night writers protest Donald Trump
480	January 30, 2017	John Malkovich, Corey Hawkins	Kings of Leon
A Closer Look, Late Night Crowd Scientists
481	January 31, 2017	Robert De Niro, Lauren Ash, Asa Butterfield	N/A
A Lot of Questions, Seth Explains Teen Slang, Pitch Meeting

=== February ===
No.	Original release date	Guest(s)	Musical/entertainment guest(s)
482	February 1, 2017	Dakota Johnson, Willie Geist	Paper Route
Couple Things, Amber Ruffin praises Donald Trump speech, Hidden Credits, Dakota Johnson and Seth try to balance a spoon on their noses
483	February 2, 2017	Leslie Mann, Jeff Perry, Alex Guarnaschelli	N/A
A Closer Look, YouTube SubCommunities
484	February 6, 2017	Tracee Ellis Ross, Dan Stevens	Electric Guest
A Closer Look, Late Night White House Press Briefing
485	February 7, 2017	Anderson Cooper, Reba McEntire, The Westminster Dogs	N/A
The Check In, Extreme Dog Shaming: Westminster Dog Show Edition, Epilogues
486	February 8, 2017	Ice Cube, Ruby Rose	Ty Segall
A Closer Look
487	February 9, 2017	Drew Barrymore, Joe Rogan, Viet Thanh Nguyen	N/A
A Closer Look
488	February 13, 2017	John Oliver, Zosia Mamet	N/A
A Closer Look, New England Patriots Fan
489	February 14, 2017	Shailene Woodley, Annaleigh Ashford, Evan McMullin	N/A
A Closer Look, The Wrong Take, Ya Burnt
490	February 15, 2017	Damian Lewis, Adam Scott	Charlotte OC
A Closer Look, Ben Warheit and Seth wear wires
491	February 16, 2017	Tracy Morgan, Malin Åkerman	Bebe Rexha
A Closer Look, Tracy Morgan Fan (Tracy Morgan)
492	February 20, 2017	Anna Kendrick, Jordan Peele	Old 97's
A Closer Look, Jordan Peele does Barack Obama impression, Popsicle Shtick
493	February 21, 2017	Gwen Stefani, Senator Kirsten Gillibrand	Tove Lo
Oscar Bait Trailer, Late Night White House Press Conference
494	February 22, 2017	Terry Crews, Leighton Meester, Dr. Ben Santer	N/A
A Closer Look, Seth Explains Teen Slang
495	February 23, 2017	Allison Williams, Paul Scheer & Rob Huebel, Paul Beatty	N/A
Hey!, A Closer Look, Late Night with Seth Meyers Superfan
496	February 27, 2017	Matthew Broderick, David Boreanaz	Regina Spektor
Amber Says What, A Closer Look
497	February 28, 2017	Aubrey Plaza, Whoopi Goldberg & Dustin Lance Black, Reza Aslan	N/A
Jokes Seth Can't Tell

=== March ===
No.	Original release date	Guest(s)	Musical/entertainment guest(s)
498	March 1, 2017	Amy Schumer, RuPaul	Panic! at the Disco
A Closer Look, Back in My Day
499	March 2, 2017	Jennifer Lopez, Sam Richardson & Tim Robinson	N/A
A Closer Look, "Mike Dated JLo"
500	March 13, 2017	Glenn Close, Alex Karpovsky, Mohsin Hamid	N/A
A Closer Look, Glenn Close brings a present for Seth's dog
501	March 14, 2017	Ewan McGregor, Zoë Kravitz	Jon Pardi
Couple Things, Trump Mingle, Joke Bucket
502	March 15, 2017	Keri Russell, Peter Krause, JD Vance	N/A
A Closer Look, Point/Counterpoint
503	March 16, 2017	Mike Myers, Erin Gibson & Bryan Safi	N/A
A Closer Look, Ya Burnt
504	March 20, 2017	Will Forte, Jay Bilas, Chris Hayes	N/A
A Closer Look
505	March 21, 2017	Dax Shepard, Hannah Simone	Hey Violet
Other Jobs Neil Gorsuch Has Had, Late Night White House Press Briefing, Extreme Dog Shaming
506	March 22, 2017	Kristen Bell, Bill Nighy	Aquilo
Breaking Nonsense, A Closer Look, The Four New Animals
507	March 23, 2017	Jake Gyllenhaal, Whitney Cummings	Post Malone featuring Quavo of Migos & Metro Boomin
A Closer Look, Jake Gyllenhaal and Ryan Reynolds FaceTime
508	March 27, 2017	Craig Ferguson, Rachel Dratch, George Saunders	N/A
A Closer Look
509	March 28, 2017	Scarlett Johansson, Joe Scarborough & Mika Brzezinski, Mario Batali	N/A
Amber's Minute of Fury, A Closer Look
510	March 29, 2017	Morgan Freeman, Keeley Hawes, Mikaela Shiffrin	Bastille
Seth Explains Teen Slang
511	March 30, 2017	Christine Baranski, Kristen Schaal	Big Thief
A Closer Look, Late Night Casserole (George Har Har Martin, Close Encounters of the Richard Kind (appearance by Richard Kind), A Closer Look done in the style of The Rockford Files, Conner O'Malley does interpretive dance), Kristen and Seth say goodnight

=== April ===
No.	Original release date	Guest(s)	Musical/entertainment guest(s)
512	April 3, 2017	Chelsea Handler, Jake Johnson	Craig Finn
A Closer Look
513	April 4, 2017	Ice-T, Freida Pinto	Julio Torres
Jokes Seth Can't Tell, Crew Poetry
514	April 5, 2017	Rashida Jones, Andrew Rannells, Alan Dershowitz	N/A
A Closer Look
515	April 6, 2017	Chris Evans, Mandy Patinkin	Michelle Branch
Devin Nunes Interview, Seth acknowledges death of Don Rickles, A Closer Look, Late Night writers comment on sexual harassment, Josh Meyers makes appearance during Chris Evans' interview
516	April 24, 2017	Jason Sudeikis, Andrea Martin, Jan Böhmermann	N/A
A Closer Look, Andrea Martin does a rap
517	April 25, 2017	Caitlyn Jenner, Buzz Bissinger, Nick Frost	N/A
Late Night White House Press Briefing, Popsicle Schtick
518	April 26, 2017	James Spader, John Mellencamp	John Mellencamp
A Closer Look, Donald Trump Speech Writers
519	April 27, 2017	Aidy Bryant, Ian McShane	RaeLynn
Melania Trump's Facebook Wall Messages, A Closer Look, Seth's opinions on 3D films

=== May ===
No.	Original release date	Guest(s)	Musical/entertainment guest(s)
520	May 1, 2017	America Ferrera, Ike Barinholtz	N/A
A Closer Look, Jokes Seth Can't Tell (appearance by America Ferrera)
521	May 2, 2017	Rachel Maddow, Beck Bennett	All Time Low
Met Gala Looks, Back in My Day, The Check In
522	May 3, 2017	Chris Pratt, Beth Behrs, Shane Smith	N/A
Amber Says What, A Closer Look
523	May 4, 2017	Wanda Sykes, Chris Gethard	Devin Dawson
A Closer Look, Let's Get Specific
524	May 8, 2017	Cobie Smulders, Christopher Meloni	Maggie Rogers
A Closer Look
525	May 9, 2017	Danny DeVito, Kathryn Hahn, Cecile Richards	N/A
How Not to Laugh at Jeff Sessions, Seth Explains Teen Slang, Bad Sponsors
526	May 10, 2017	Sophia Bush, Zach Woods	Dan Mintz
A Closer Look
527	May 11, 2017	Aziz Ansari, Jenna Dewan Tatum	LANY
A Closer Look, Ya Burnt
528	May 15, 2017	Tracy Morgan, Michael McKean, Senator Ben Sasse	N/A
A Closer Look
529	May 16, 2017	Jennifer Hudson, Horatio Sanz, David Mandel	N/A
A Closer Look
530	May 17, 2017	Naomi Watts, Hank Azaria	BNQT
A Closer Look, Miley Cyrus makes a surprise appearance, Shrek Forever After Superfan
531	May 18, 2017	Jeffrey Tambor, Debra Messing, Michael Barbaro	N/A
A Closer Look
532	May 22, 2017	Kyle Chandler, Michaela Watkins	Come from Away
A Closer Look, Extreme Dog Shaming
533	May 23, 2017	Chris Pine, Senator John McCain	N/A
Seth acknowledges the Manchester Arena bombing, Amber Says What, The Check In, YouTube SubCommunities
534	May 24, 2017	Kevin Spacey, Ellie Kemper, Tom Perez	N/A
A Closer Look, Ellie Kemper's Embarrassing Past Roles
535	May 25, 2017	Bryan Cranston, Alexandra Daddario, Jessica Seinfeld	N/A
A Closer Look, More Accurate Headlines

=== June ===
No.	Original release date	Guest(s)	Musical/entertainment guest(s)
536	June 5, 2017	Kevin Kline, Sharon Horgan	Cage the Elephant
A Closer Look, The Wrong Take
537	June 6, 2017	Courtney Love, John Early, Chef Masa Takayama	N/A
Seth Explains Teen Slang, Point/Counterpoint, John Early does Toni Collette impression
538	June 7, 2017	Alan Alda, Mary Elizabeth Winstead	Desus & Mero
A Closer Look
539	June 8, 2017	Joel Edgerton, Zoe Lister-Jones	Royal Blood
A Closer Look
540	June 12, 2017	Elisabeth Moss, John Mulaney	Brett Eldredge
A Closer Look, Old Video Games – Presented by JORBUS
541	June 13, 2017	Kate McKinnon, Brian Tyree Henry, Janet Mock	N/A
A Closer Look, Kate McKinnon does Jeff Sessions impression
542	June 14, 2017	Taylor Schilling, Jim O'Heir, Lizzy Goodman	N/A
Seth acknowledges the Congressional baseball shooting, Jokes Seth Can't Tell, Late Night White House Press Briefing
543	June 15, 2017	Andy Cohen, Patty Jenkins, Rakesh Satyal	N/A
A Closer Look, Ya Burnt
544	June 19, 2017	Kirsten Dunst, Jerrod Carmichael	Jeff Tweedy
A Closer Look, Late Night Debates How to Pronounce Cavalry and Açaí
545	June 20, 2017	Will Ferrell, Laverne Cox	Jeff Tweedy
Amber Says What, Ben Holland, Seth & Will Clear the Air
546	June 21, 2017	Amy Poehler, Nicolle Wallace	Daru Jones
A Closer Look, Really!?! with Seth & Amy
547	June 22, 2017	Ice Cube, Kumail Nanjiani, Mayor Pete Buttigieg	N/A
A Closer Look
548	June 26, 2017	Dave Franco, Ruth Negga	James Blunt
A Closer Look, Back in My Day
549	June 27, 2017	Tom Holland, Joy Behar	The Lumineers
The Check In, Gørbøn Hausinfrud
550	June 28, 2017	Sean "Diddy" Combs, Hilary Duff, Edgar Wright	N/A
A Closer Look, Ben Warheit
551	June 29, 2017	Lin-Manuel Miranda, Jason Mantzoukas, Martha Stewart	N/A
I CAN'T, A Closer Look

=== July ===
No.	Original release date	Guest(s)	Musical/entertainment guest(s)
552	July 17, 2017	Maya Rudolph, Lorde	Lorde
A Closer Look, Maya Rudolph does Ivanka Trump impression, Basket O'Wigs (Maya Rudolph)
553	July 18, 2017	Patrick Stewart, Alison Brie, Attorney General Eric Schneiderman	N/A
The Check In, Terrible Sponsors
554	July 19, 2017	Queen Latifah, Zoe Kazan, Dave Portnoy	N/A
A Closer Look, Hidden Credits
555	July 20, 2017	Ricky Gervais, Abby Elliott	X Ambassadors
A Closer Look, More Accurate Headlines
556	July 24, 2017	Charlize Theron, Jane Lynch	Aminé
A Closer Look
557	July 25, 2017	Kelly Ripa, Fred Savage	Ahamed Weinberg
Jokes Seth Can't Tell, The Check In
558	July 26, 2017	Jim Gaffigan, Andrea Mitchell	Fall Out Boy
Sooo... That Was a Lie Then?, A Closer Look, Late Night's Female Writers Respond to Trump's Transgender Ban
559	July 27, 2017	Tyra Banks, Kyle Mooney	OneRepublic
A Closer Look, Ya Burnt, Kyle Mooney brings video tapes
560	July 31, 2017	Molly Shannon, Matthew Rhys	Bleachers
A Closer Look

=== August ===
No.	Original release date	Guest(s)	Musical/entertainment guest(s)
561	August 1, 2017	Idris Elba, Alexis Bledel, Michael Voltaggio	N/A
Getting to Know John F. Kelly, The Check In
562	August 2, 2017	Rob Lowe, Brad Paisley	Brad Paisley
Amber Says What, A Closer Look
563	August 3, 2017	John Krasinski, Melissa Leo, Congressman Adam Schiff	N/A
A Closer Look
564	August 7, 2017	Billy Eichner, Ashley Graham	The All-American Rejects
A Closer Look, Crew Poetry
565	August 8, 2017	Eva Longoria, Max Greenfield, John Singleton	N/A
Seth Explains Teen Slang, Seth's nephew Derrick
566	August 9, 2017	Colin Jost & Michael Che, Brian Knappenberger	N/A
A Closer Look, Game of Jones (appearance by Conleth Hill)
567	August 10, 2017	Howie Mandel, Senator Tammy Duckworth, Aaron Schatz	N/A
A Closer Look
568	August 14, 2017	Kenan Thompson, Leah Remini, Bryan Fogel	N/A
Seth acknowledges the Unite the Right rally, A Closer Look
569	August 15, 2017	Adam Driver, Marlon Wayans, Anthony Atamanuik	N/A
Breaking Crazy, Give 'Em a Medal, Amber's Safe Space
570	August 16, 2017	Bob Odenkirk, Brian Kelley & Tyler Hubbard	Florida Georgia Line
A Closer Look, Late Night Casserole (O–Dunkirk, CNN Countdown, Late Night filming in Twin Peaks, Conner O'Malley does interpretive dance to Sex and the City theme), Seth and Florida Georgia Line have whiskey
571	August 17, 2017	Michael Moore, Carrie Coon	Little Big Town
A Closer Look, Popsicle Schtick

=== September ===
No.	Original release date	Guest(s)	Musical/entertainment guest(s)
572	September 5, 2017	Jake Tapper, Gwendoline Christie	Gary Clark Jr.
A Closer Look, Seth wishes viewers a happy birthday and sends a message to his neighbor
573	September 6, 2017	Trevor Noah, Maggie Gyllenhaal	N/A
Hey!, Amber Says What, Did You Know, Actors on Auditions
574	September 7, 2017	Seth MacFarlane, Sheryl Crow	Sheryl Crow
A Closer Look, Point/Counterpoint
575	September 11, 2017	Danny McBride, Jill Kargman	Living Colour
Jimmy Fallon escorts Seth to his desk, iPhone 8 Features, A Closer Look
576	September 12, 2017	Emma Roberts, Father John Misty	Father John Misty
Seth Explains Teen Slang, The Check In
577	September 13, 2017	Jeffrey Tambor, Walton Goggins	Action Bronson
A Closer Look
578	September 14, 2017	Jennifer Lawrence, Caitriona Balfe, Ezra Klein	N/A
A Closer Look, Jennifer Lawrence and Seth have wine
579	September 19, 2017	Anderson Cooper, Gilbert Gottfried, Celeste Ng	N/A
A Closer Look
580	September 20, 2017	Bobby Moynihan, Billie Jean King	N/A
Jokes Seth Can't Tell, The Check In, Back in My Day
581	September 21, 2017	Emma Stone, Kaitlin Olson	Blondie
A Closer Look
582	September 22, 2017	Edie Falco, Jordan Klepper, Grace Coddington	N/A
A Closer Look
583	September 25, 2017	Jim Parsons, Chrissy Metz	Ruston Kelly
A Closer Look feat. Amber Ruffin, More Accurate Headlines
584	September 26, 2017	Larry David, Kiefer Sutherland, Josh Earnest	N/A
Hey!, Larry David joins the Late Night writing staff
585	September 27, 2017	Sofía Vergara, Craig Robinson, Julie Klausner	N/A
Seth reflects on his relationship with football, A Closer Look
586	September 28, 2017	Jennifer Hudson, Jeff Garlin, Jesmyn Ward	N/A
A Closer Look

=== October ===
No.	Original release date	Guest(s)	Musical/entertainment guest(s)
587	October 2, 2017	Michael Strahan, Justin Hartley	Tash Sultana
Seth acknowledges the 2017 Las Vegas shooting, A Closer Look feat. Jenny Hagel
588	October 3, 2017	Kyra Sedgwick, Cecily Strong, Salman Rushdie	N/A
I CAN'T, Late Night White House Press Briefing, Old Video Games
589	October 4, 2017	Tina Fey, Kevin Millar & Sean Casey	Matt Goldich
A Closer Look, Bad Sponsors
590	October 5, 2017	Kerry Washington, Method Man	New Politics
A Closer Look
591	October 9, 2017	Senator Cory Booker, Mackenzie Davis	Phoenix
A Closer Look, Women of Late Night react to Harvey Weinstein's apology
592	October 10, 2017	James Spader, Domhnall Gleeson, Ladee Hubbard	N/A
Amber Ruffin addresses Mike Ditka's comments about oppression, Seth Explains Teen Slang, Two People from Vermont Who Love Fall
593	October 11, 2017	Kathy Bates, Taran Killam	Japandroids
Seth responds to Eminem's anti-Trump rap, A Closer Look, Taran Killam impersonates Eminem
594	October 12, 2017	Gerard Butler, Patton Oswalt	N/A
Seth reflects on his relationship with football, A Closer Look, Late Night writer Ben Warheit asks Seth to be with him in the silence
595	October 23, 2017	Mariska Hargitay, John Cho	ZZ Ward featuring Fantastic Negrito
A Closer Look
596	October 24, 2017	Anna Faris, Cole Sprouse, Robert Kirkman	N/A
Late Night Slow Clap, Jokes Seth Can't Tell, The Check In, Cole Sprouse reads a poem
597	October 25, 2017	Megyn Kelly, Nathan Fielder	Colton Dunn
A Closer Look
598	October 26, 2017	Liev Schreiber, Cheryl Hines, Mikey Day	N/A
A Closer Look, Ya Burnt
599	October 30, 2017	Heidi Klum, Senator Bernie Sanders	Imagine Dragons
A Closer Look
600	October 31, 2017	Anthony Bourdain, Aya Cash, Todd Barry	N/A
Amber's Minute of Fury, Late Night White House Press Briefing, Seth wishes viewers a happy birthday and sends a message to his neighbor

=== November ===
No.	Original release date	Guest(s)	Musical/entertainment guest(s)
601	November 1, 2017	Blake Shelton, Robin Thede	Blake Shelton
Seth acknowledges the 2017 Lower Manhattan attack, A Lot of Problems, A Closer Look
602	November 2, 2017	Rosie O'Donnell, David France	N/A
A Closer Look, YouTube subCommunities
603	November 6, 2017	Ellen Pompeo, John Leguizamo	Jhené Aiko
Seth urges viewers to vote for Donald Trump for Mayor of New York City, Seth acknowledges the Sutherland Springs church shooting, A Closer Look, Ellen Pompeo and Seth have tequila
604	November 7, 2017	John Lithgow, Jonathan Groff, Michael Lewis	N/A
The Check In, Back in My Day feat. John Lithgow
605	November 8, 2017	Hillary Rodham Clinton, Will Ferrell	N/A
A Closer Look, Jokes Seth Can't Tell feat. Hillary Rodham Clinton, Hillary Rodham Clinton and Seth have champagne
606	November 9, 2017	Mark Wahlberg, Martin McDonagh	N/A
A Closer Look
607	November 13, 2017	Carey Mulligan, Beanie Feldstein, Danny Bowien	N/A
A Closer Look, Extreme Dog Shaming
608	November 14, 2017	Whoopi Goldberg, Joe Keery, Christian Siriano	N/A
A Closer Look, Jon Stewart plays the drums and Seth announces his prize for Night of Too Many Stars, Seth wears one of Whoopi Goldberg's holiday sweaters
609	November 15, 2017	Jeremy Irons, Rich Eisen, Jessica Ladd	N/A
Seth Explains Teen Slang
610	November 16, 2017	Chris Hayes, Kristin Scott Thomas	Alex Lahey
Pervatol: The First Sleep Aid for Sexual Predators, A Closer Look
611	November 20, 2017	Amy Sedaris, Greta Gerwig	Jessie Reyez
A Closer Look, Amy Sedaris brings a flyswatter
612	November 21, 2017	Jeff Daniels, Danielle Brooks	Daniel Caesar
Amber Says What, A Closer Look, Danielle Brooks makes balloon animals
613	November 22, 2017	Chris Cuomo, Tim Meadows	Kenny DeForest
Seth acknowledges the passing of his favorite teacher Walter Lubelczyk, A Closer Look, Chris Cuomo gives Seth a t-shirt
614	November 23, 2017	Josh Meyers, Larry Meyers and Hilary Meyers	N/A
Ashe and Frisbee dress up for Thanksgiving, Seth Explains Teen Slang: Thanksgiving Edition, The Meyers Family Clears the Air, Popsicle Schtick (with Larry Meyers commentary)
615	November 27, 2017	Ice-T, Michael Showalter	Midland
8 Seconds of Seth Pinching the Bridge of His Nose, The Consumer Financial Protection Bureau Players, A Closer Look
616	November 28, 2017	Saoirse Ronan, Rachel Brosnahan, Michelle Wolf	N/A
Late Night White House Press Briefing, Terrible Sponsors feat. Michelle Wolf
617	November 29, 2017	John Oliver, Rachel Bloom	N/A
A Closer Look
618	November 30, 2017	Allison Williams, Ben Mendelsohn	Jacob Banks
A Closer Look, Point Counterpoint

=== December ===
No.	Original release date	Guest(s)	Musical/entertainment guest(s)
619	December 4, 2017	Samantha Bee, Matt Smith	Steve Earle & Lucinda Williams
The Tiny Voice in the Back of Donald Trump's Head, A Closer Look
620	December 5, 2017	Michael Shannon, Ilana Glazer & Abbi Jacobson	Hiss Golden Messenger
The Tiny Voice in the Back of Donald Trump's Head, The Check In, The Wrong Take
621	December 6, 2017	Dax Shepard, Lily James, Max Brooks	N/A
The Tiny Voice in the Back of Donald Trump's Head, A Closer Look
622	December 7, 2017	Wendy Williams, Mike Birbiglia	N/A
Amber Ruffin punches Seth in the face and apologizes, The Tiny Voice in the Back of Donald Trump's Head, A Closer Look, Seth takes questions from the audience
623	December 11, 2017	Anthony Anderson, Hong Chau	Amanda Seales
A Closer Look, Just the Tax, Ma'am
624	December 12, 2017	Seth Rogen, Jenna Coleman	Clean Bandit & Julia Michaels
A Couple Things, Jokes Seth Can't Tell, Seth & Seth Clear the Air
625	December 13, 2017	Sarah Paulson, Judd Apatow, Grant Morrison	N/A
Amber Ruffin explains how black women saved America from Roy Moore, A Closer Look
626	December 14, 2017	Laura Dern, Fergie	Fergie
A Closer Look, Seth's opinions on shoe-free households
627	December 18, 2017	Kenny Chesney, Aaron Sorkin	Kenny Chesney
A Closer Look, Seth chats with interstellar asteroid 'Oumuamua
628	December 19, 2017	Seth MacFarlane, Karlie Kloss	Seth MacFarlane
Words the Trump Administration Wants to Replace, Seth Explains Teen Slang: Holiday Edition, Late Night Casserole
629	December 20, 2017	Ansel Elgort, Martha Stewart, Nico De Soto	N/A
Happy Holidays from Chevy, A Closer Look
630	December 21, 2017	Rebel Wilson, Senator-elect Doug Jones	N/A
Amber Says What, A Closer Look, Bitcoin Commercial
