= List of Late Night with Seth Meyers episodes (2018) =

- No. of episodes: 146

Release
- Original network: NBC

Season chronology
- ← Previous; 2017 episodes Next → 2019 episodes

This is the list of episodes for Late Night with Seth Meyers in 2018.

== 2018 ==
=== January ===
No.	Original release date	Guest(s)	Musical/entertainment guest(s)
631	January 9, 2018	Jordan Peele, Patrick Wilson, Lewis Black	N/A
A Closer Look
632	January 10, 2018	James Franco, Lawrence O'Donnell	The Roots featuring Bilal
Late Night White House Press Briefing, Hidden Credits
633	January 11, 2018	Jake Tapper, Matt Ingebretson & Jake Weisman	N/A
Seth Has to Walk Away for a Minute, Amber Cougar Mellencamp, A Closer Look, Seth wishes viewers a happy birthday and sends a message to his neighbor
634	January 15, 2018	David Duchovny, Megan Boone	Jillian Jacqueline
A Closer Look, Back in My Day
635	January 16, 2018	Leslie Jones, Tracy Letts, Esther Povitsky	N/A
Jokes Seth Can't Tell, The Check In
636	January 17, 2018	Sean "Diddy" Combs, Luke Evans, Nicole Sullivan	N/A
A Closer Look
637	January 18, 2018	Catherine Zeta-Jones, Carrie Brownstein	Glen Hansard
A Closer Look, Seth's opinions on chip cards
638	January 22, 2018	John Lithgow, Selma Blair, Derek Waters	N/A
Who's Trump Calling?, The Tiny Voice in the Back of Donald Trump's Head, A Closer Look
639	January 23, 2018	Michael Che & Colin Jost, Jack Antonoff	Ashley McBryde
The Tiny Voice in the Back of Donald Trump's Head, Seth Explains Teen Slang
640	January 24, 2018	Jim Gaffigan, Van Jones	Josh Gondelman
The Tiny Voice in the Back of Donald Trump's Head, A Closer Look, Bad Sponsors
641	January 25, 2018	Willem Dafoe, Dakota Fanning, Amirah Kassem	N/A
The Tiny Voice in the Back of Donald Trump's Head, A Closer Look, Lucas
642	January 29, 2018	Governor John Kasich, Darren Criss	Kimbra
A Closer Look, Flip Flop
643	January 30, 2018	Glenn Howerton, Common, Chloe Benjamin	N/A
Hey!, Amber Says What
644	January 31, 2018	Dakota Johnson, Taylor Kitsch, Maggie Haberman	N/A
A Closer Look

=== February ===
No.	Original release date	Guest(s)	Musical/entertainment guest(s)
645	February 1, 2018	Rachel Maddow, Dylan McDermott	Rita Ora
A Closer Look, Seth & Kelly Go Day Drinking
646	February 5, 2018	Billy Eichner, China Anne McClain, Nafessa Williams	Bedouine
A Closer Look, Extreme Dog Shaming
647	February 6, 2018	James Spader, Whitney Cummings, Malcolm Jenkins	N/A
Late Night White House Press Briefing
648	February 7, 2018	John Mulaney, Representative Seth Moulton	Matty Matheson
Let's Get Petty, A Closer Look
649	February 8, 2018	Holly Hunter, Jason Jones	The Broadway Cast of Once on This Island
A Closer Look, Newspaper Movie Trailer
650	February 26, 2018	Uma Thurman, Jimmi Simpson, Stephanie Wittels Wachs	N/A
It Slowly Dawns On Seth That This Man Is Our President, Amber Says What, A Closer Look
651	February 27, 2018	Kelly Clarkson, Kal Penn	Kelly Clarkson
Seth Explains Teen Slang, The Check In
652	February 28, 2018	Sarah Jessica Parker, Mae Whitman, Tony Rock	N/A
Amber Ruffin reviews Black Panther, A Closer Look, Seth gives Sarah Jessica Parker a mug

=== March ===
No.	Original release date	Guest(s)	Musical/entertainment guest(s)
653	March 1, 2018	Joel Edgerton, Don Lemon, Josie Totah	N/A
A Closer Look
654	March 5, 2018	Nathan Lane, Michael K. Williams, Brad Meltzer	N/A
A Closer Look
655	March 6, 2018	Luke Bryan, Mayor Eric Garcetti	Luke Bryan
Seth chats with "Sam Nunberg", Back in My Day, Joke Bucket
656	March 7, 2018	Hoda Kotb, Nick Robinson	Old Dominion
A Closer Look, The Wrong Take
657	March 8, 2018	Reese Witherspoon, David Remnick	N/A
I Also Thought That Guy's Dad Was Dead, A Closer Look, Jokes Seth Can't Tell, The Late Night Players perform The New Yorker cartoons
658	March 12, 2018	Connie Britton, Rose Leslie	Gang of Youths
A Closer Look, Hidden Credits
659	March 13, 2018	Alan Cumming, Christiane Amanpour	Beth Ditto
Couple Things, Late Night White House Press Briefing, Popsicle Schtick
660	March 14, 2018	Ricky Gervais, Lena Waithe, Luke Mitchell	N/A
A Closer Look
661	March 15, 2018	John Cleese, Laverne Cox	Joyelle Nicole Johnson
A Closer Look
662	March 19, 2018	Bill Hader, Rosie Perez, Tayari Jones	N/A
A Closer Look
663	March 20, 2018	John Oliver, Laura Benanti	Blake Shelton
The Check In, Amber Adventures to Australia
664	March 21, 2018	Tyler Perry, Ben Mendelsohn, McKay Coppins	N/A
Late Night Tips for Spring, A Closer Look
665	March 22, 2018	Taraji P. Henson, Thomas Middleditch	Yungblud
Teenagers: Saving Our Country So You Don't Have To, A Closer Look

=== April ===
No.	Original release date	Guest(s)	Musical/entertainment guest(s)
666	April 2, 2018	Leslie Mann, Jared Harris, Senator Amy Klobuchar	N/A
A Closer Look
667	April 3, 2018	Emily Blunt, Zazie Beetz	Ryan Reiss
Seth Explains Teen Slang, Point Counterpoint, Seth congratulates Cycle for Survival
668	April 4, 2018	Keri Russell, Scott Thompson	Jordan Davis
A Closer Look, Who's Next?
669	April 5, 2018	Edie Falco, Jason Clarke, Sarah McBride	N/A
A Closer Look, Extreme Dog Shaming
670	April 9, 2018	Tiffany Haddish	The War on Drugs
Seth announces the birth of his son Axel Strahl Meyers, Jokes Seth Can't Tell (with Tiffany Haddish)
671	April 10, 2018	Timothy Olyphant, D'Arcy Carden, Wyatt Cenac	N/A
A Closer Look, Timothy Olyphant writes his introduction
672	April 11, 2018	John Krasinski, Retta	James Bay
Roy Amberson performs "Ryan", Late Night White House Press Briefing, Retta gives Seth a gift for his new baby
673	April 12, 2018	Aubrey Plaza, Ari Melber, Jason Reynolds	N/A
A Closer Look, Roseanne fans explain why they love the show
674	April 23, 2018	Chris Evans, Desus & Mero	Lily Allen
The Tiny Voice in the Back of Donald Trump's Head, A Closer Look, Chris and Scott Evans prove how well they know each other
675	April 24, 2018	Ice-T, Sarah Kendzior	N/A
The Tiny Voice in the Back of Donald Trump's Head, Amber Says What, The Check In, Seth's opinions on business cards
676	April 25, 2018	Jimmy Fallon, Patton Oswalt	Kylie Minogue
Seth and Jimmy walk together from Studio 6-B to Studio 8-G, The Tiny Voice in the Back of Donald Trump's Head, A Closer Look
677	April 26, 2018	Chris Hayes, Brian Koppelman, David Levien	N/A
Just No, The Tiny Voice in the Back of Donald Trump's Head, A Closer Look
678	April 30, 2018	John Mulaney, Lauren Ambrose	Lauren Ambrose
Seth supports Michelle Wolf's White House Correspondents' Dinner stand-up, Jenny Hagel responds to Trump's remarks about Hispanics, A Closer Look

=== May ===
No.	Original release date	Guest(s)	Musical/entertainment guest(s)
679	May 1, 2018	Kathy Griffin, Matthew Rhys, Jonny Sun	N/A
Trump's Questions for Robert Mueller, Ya Burnt, Matthew Rhys tests his wine knowledge
680	May 2, 2018	Priyanka Chopra, Mike O'Brien	Lord Huron
Amber Ruffin raps a response to Kanye West's slavery comments, A Closer Look, Seth chats with Trump's personal caddie "Richie Davidson"
681	May 3, 2018	Keith Urban, Stephanie Beatriz	Keith Urban
A Closer Look, Bad Sponsors
682	May 7, 2018	John Goodman, Jeffrey Wright, Rukmini Callimachi	N/A
A Closer Look
683	May 8, 2018	Tracee Ellis Ross, Cameron Monaghan	Joe Pera
Things Donald Trump Isn't Invited To, Seth Explains Teen Slang, Hidden Credits
684	May 9, 2018	Michelle Wolf, Zach Woods	Jessie Ware
A Closer Look, Jokes Seth Can't Tell (with Michelle Wolf)
685	May 10, 2018	Michael Shannon, Ali Wentworth	August Greene
A Closer Look, Old Video Games (presented by Jorbus)
686	May 14, 2018	Milo Ventimiglia, Laurie Metcalf	Ashley Monroe
A Closer Look, The Wrong Take
687	May 15, 2018	Ethan Hawke, Ronan Farrow, Jodie Comer	N/A
Late Night White House Press Briefing
688	May 16, 2018	Josh Brolin, Ella Purnell	The Aces
Renewed! or Cancelled! with Barry Reed, A Closer Look, Late Night writer Ben Warheit is punished after confessing that he is a moderate Democrat
689	May 17, 2018	Kate McKinnon, Candice Bergen, André Leon Talley	N/A
Amber's Minute of Fury, A Closer Look
690	May 21, 2018	Olivia Munn, Ava DuVernay	Brothers Osborne
Mueller Investigation Timeline, A Closer Look, I'm Taking Red Hats Back ft. Mike Karnell
691	May 22, 2018	Emilia Clarke, Phoebe Robinson, Jeffrey Morgenthaler	N/A
Ya Burnt, The Check In
692	May 23, 2018	David Letterman	Aurora
Amber Says What: Royal Wedding Edition, A Closer Look, David Letterman gives Seth a live tick
693	May 24, 2018	Mindy Kaling, Ellie Kemper, Liz Garbus	N/A
A Closer Look, The Kind of Story We Need Right Now

=== June ===
No.	Original release date	Guest(s)	Musical/entertainment guest(s)
694	June 11, 2018	Jake Tapper, Jane Krakowski	Devin Dawson
A Closer Look
695	June 12, 2018	Julianna Margulies, Annabelle Wallis, Tom King	N/A
A Closer Look, Do We Like Michael Avenatti?
696	June 13, 2018	Claire Danes, Hannibal Buress	Amber Mark
Jokes Seth Can't Tell, Clean Comedy with Max Frank
697	June 14, 2018	Ed Helms, Vanessa Kirby	Hannah Gadsby
A Closer Look
698	June 18, 2018	Jesse Tyler Ferguson, Louie Anderson	Cold War Kids
A Closer Look, Fred Judges a Book By Its Cover, Jokes We Wrote Because the President Slept With a Porn Star
699	June 19, 2018	Benicio del Toro, Michael Ian Black	Hayley Kiyoko
Late Night White House Press Briefing, Fred Judges a Book By Its Cover
700	June 20, 2018	Mike Myers, Alison Brie	Kacey Musgraves
A Closer Look, Fred Judges a Book By Its Cover
701	June 21, 2018	Colin Quinn, Senator Tammy Baldwin, Missy Robbins	N/A
Space Force, A Closer Look, Fred Judges a Book By Its Cover, Senator Tammy Baldwin and Seth have beer
702	June 25, 2018	Chris Hayes, Lil Rel Howery	Years & Years
A Closer Look, Seth's opinions on the beach
703	June 26, 2018	Nick Kroll, Stacey Abrams, Katie Stevens	N/A
Amber Ruffin as 80's pop star Rockwell sings "White Women Watching Me", A Closer Look
704	June 27, 2018	Hugh Grant, Kyrie Irving, Tim Robinson	N/A
Jenny Hagel congratulates Alexandria Ocasio-Cortez in Spanish, Ya Burnt
705	June 28, 2018	Paul Rudd, Florence Welch	Florence and the Machine
Late Night writer Dina Gusovsky shares her immigrant story, A Closer Look

=== July ===
No.	Original release date	Guest(s)	Musical/entertainment guest(s)
706	July 16, 2018	Kristin Chenoweth, Andrew Rannells	N/A
Royal Protocol Breaches, A Closer Look, YouTube subCommunities
707	July 17, 2018	Joel McHale, Beth Ditto	Nimesh Patel
Amber Says What, Seth Explains Teen Slang
708	July 18, 2018	Christine Baranski, Niecy Nash	Miranda Lambert
A Closer Look, Scandal Watch
709	July 19, 2018	Amanda Seyfried, Katy Tur	Brandi Carlile
The Kind of Story We Need Right Now, A Closer Look
710	July 23, 2018	Andy Cohen, Jacob Soboroff, Rebecca Makkai	N/A
A Closer Look
711	July 24, 2018	Tony Shalhoub, Bo Burnham	N/A
Late Night White House Press Briefing, The Check In, Bo Burnham reads letter to himself, Republican strategist Charles Reinke gets caught contradicting himself
712	July 25, 2018	Amy Poehler	Fall Out Boy
A Closer Look, Really!?! with Seth & Amy
713	July 26, 2018	Martha Stewart, Jonathan Rhys Meyers	N/A
Amber's Minute of Fury, A Closer Look, Martha Stewart gives Seth a dog jacket
714	July 30, 2018	Armie Hammer, Brandon Flowers	Brandon Flowers
The Tiny Voice in the Back of Donald Trump's Head, A Closer Look
715	July 31, 2018	Amy Adams, Henry Winkler, Simon Rich	N/A
Getting to Know Brett Kavanaugh, The Tiny Voice in the Back of Donald Trump's Head, Jokes Seth Can't Tell

=== August ===
No.	Original release date	Guest(s)	Musical/entertainment guest(s)
716	August 1, 2018	Bob Odenkirk, Natasha Lyonne	Kelsea Ballerini
The Tiny Voice in the Back of Donald Trump's Head, A Closer Look, Bob Odenkirk and Seth do commentary for Better Call Saul scene
717	August 2, 2018	Ewan McGregor, Ann Dowd	N/A
The Tiny Voice in the Back of Donald Trump's Head, A Closer Look, Ya Burnt
718	August 6, 2018	Lester Holt, Alicia Silverstone	Bryce Vine
A Closer Look, Jenny Hagel delivers a message to two women she saw at the zoo
719	August 7, 2018	Taylor Schilling, Brendan Gleeson, Jason Kander	N/A
Seth Explains Teen Slang, The Check In
720	August 8, 2018	Seth Rogen, Alyssa Milano, Chef Angie Mar	N/A
A Closer Look
721	August 9, 2018	Kelsey Grammer, Rainn Wilson	Franz Ferdinand
A Closer Look, Point Counterpoint
722	August 13, 2018	Glenn Close, Topher Grace	Low Cut Connie
A Closer Look, Fred Judges a Book by Its Cover
723	August 14, 2018	Spike Lee, Senator Elizabeth Warren, Rhea Seehorn	N/A
Seth Fires a Dog, Amber Ruffin Remakes Art Created by Problematic Men, Fred Judges a Book by Its Cover
724	August 15, 2018	Chris O'Dowd, Regina Hall	grandson
The Kind of Story We Need Right Now, A Closer Look, Fred Judges a Book by Its Cover
725	August 16, 2018	Jessica Biel, Awkwafina, Matt Groening	N/A
3D Guns: What Are They and How Do They Work?, A Closer Look, Fred Judges a Book by Its Cover, Matt Groening demonstrates his drawing style

=== September ===
No.	Original release date	Guest(s)	Musical/entertainment guest(s)
726	September 4, 2018	Chris Cuomo, Jerrod Carmichael	Ruston Kelly
Amber Ruffin addresses protests against Nike, Inc. ad campaign featuring Colin Kaepernick, A Closer Look
727	September 5, 2018	Cynthia Nixon, Maggie Gyllenhaal, Ingrid Rojas Contreras	N/A
Late Night White House Press Briefing, Seth surveys the Late Night crew about what they call their grandparents
728	September 6, 2018	Jennifer Garner, Stephanie Ruhle	Bebe Rexha
A Closer Look, Seth's opinions on casual pleasantries
729	September 10, 2018	Emma Thompson, Elle Fanning	Lykke Li featuring Aminé
A Closer Look, Fred Judges a Book by Its Cover
730	September 11, 2018	Anna Kendrick, Natasha Rothwell	N/A
What Does Why Did Does He I Mean Man, Seth Explains Teen Slang, Fred Judges a Book by Its Cover, Bad Sponsors
731	September 12, 2018	Maya Rudolph & Fred Armisen, Dominic West	N/A
Amber Says What & Then She Says Why, A Closer Look
732	September 13, 2018	Keira Knightley, Neal Brennan	Caitlyn Smith
A Closer Look, Fred Judges a Book by Its Cover
733	September 17, 2018	Julianne Moore, Sturgill Simpson, Khaled Hosseini	N/A
A Closer Look
734	September 18, 2018	Mariska Hargitay & Ice-T, Sebastian Maniscalco	Tom Odell
Jokes Seth Can't Tell, Back in My Day
735	September 19, 2018	Matthew McConaughey, Taran Killam	Lady Antebellum
A Closer Look, Matthew McConaughey and Seth have bourbon, Seth Chews Out His Staff
736	September 20, 2018	Kelly Clarkson, Freddie Highmore, Ken Burns	N/A
The Kind of Story We Need Right Now, A Closer Look, Kelly Clarkson and Seth trade places
737	September 24, 2018	Samantha Bee, Ron Livingston	Portugal. The Man
A Closer Look
738	September 25, 2018	Ted Danson	Interpol
Couple Things, Ya Burnt, Late Night Casserole
739	September 26, 2018	Kevin Hart, Kristen Bell, Hari Nef	N/A
A Closer Look, Kristen Bell reads Donald Trump tweets
740	September 27, 2018	Pete Davidson, Mary Lynn Rajskub	Zainab Johnson
A Closer Look, Mary Lynn Rajskub does choreography

=== October ===
No.	Original release date	Guest(s)	Musical/entertainment guest(s)
741	October 1, 2018	Kenan Thompson, Jameela Jamil	The Cast of Mean Girls
A Closer Look
742	October 2, 2018	Eric McCormack, Sean Casey & Kevin Millar, Amanda Litman	N/A
Amber Says What, The Check In
743	October 3, 2018	Molly Shannon, Constance Wu	Nathaniel Rateliff & the Night Sweats
A Closer Look, Molly Shannon dances, Barry the IT Guy
744	October 4, 2018	John Mulaney, Meredith Hagner, Alex Ross	N/A
A Closer Look
745	October 22, 2018	Ike Barinholtz, Kiernan Shipka	Courtney Barnett
A Closer Look, The Wrong Take
746	October 23, 2018	Wanda Sykes, David Cross, Nafissa Thompson-Spires	N/A
Amber Ruffin Addresses Megyn Kelly's comments on Blackface, Late Night White House Press Briefing, Hidden Credits
747	October 24, 2018	Jonah Hill, Emily VanCamp	The Avett Brothers
A Closer Look
748	October 25, 2018	Gerard Butler, Nicolle Wallace	Louie Anderson
A Closer Look
749	October 29, 2018	Amanda Peet	Jake Shears
The Tiny Voice in the Back of Donald Trump's Head, Seth acknowledges the Pittsburgh synagogue shooting, A Closer Look
750	October 30, 2018	Wendy Williams, Chris Gethard, Sam Esmail	N/A
The Tiny Voice in the Back of Donald Trump's Head, Jokes Seth Can't Tell
751	October 31, 2018	Diane Lane, Doug Liman	Cloves
The Tiny Voice in the Back of Donald Trump's Head, Seth reveals his children's Halloween costumes, Amber and a kitten named Liberty urge viewers to vote, Popsicle Schtick

=== November ===
No.	Original release date	Guest(s)	Musical/entertainment guest(s)
752	November 1, 2018	Michael Moore, Paul Dano	N/A
The Tiny Voice in the Back of Donald Trump's Head, A Closer Look
753	November 5, 2018	Claire Foy, Lucas Hedges	boygenius
A Closer Look, Seth wishes viewers a happy birthday and sends a message to his neighbor
754	November 6, 2018	Billy Eichner, Soledad O'Brien	N/A
A Closer Look, Amber Says What
755	November 7, 2018	Sarah Jessica Parker, Hallie Jackson	N/A
Ya Burnt, Point Counterpoint
756	November 8, 2018	Tracy Morgan, David Remnick	N/A
A Closer Look, Live New Yorker Cartoons
757	November 12, 2024	Kerry Washington, David Sedaris, Mamoudou Athie	N/A
A Closer Look
758	November 13, 2018	Jeff Goldblum, Dick Cavett, Chef Mark Iacono	N/A
Ally Hord explains why Florida has trouble with elections, Late Night White House Press Conference, Mike Scollins invites his cousin to Late Night
759	November 14, 2018	Stanley Tucci, Kate Bolduan	Pale Waves
Getting to Know Matt Whitaker, A Closer Look, Bad Sponsors
760	November 15, 2018	Martin Short, Brian Tyree Henry	Amir Obè
A Closer Look, Redemption Train, Brian Tyree Henry gives Seth a hat
761	November 19, 2018	Sarah Silverman, Jason Mantzoukas	Broods
A Closer Look, Fred Judges a Book by Its Cover
762	November 20, 2018	John Kerry, Rachel Dratch	Daniel Simonsen
Seth Explains Teen Slang (Thanksgiving Edition), The Check In, Fred Judges a Book by Its Cover
763	November 21, 2018	Daniel Radcliffe, Arjen Lubach, Antoni Porowski	N/A
A Closer Look, Fred Judges a Book by Its Cover
764	November 22, 2018	Josh Meyers, Larry Meyers and Hilary Meyers	N/A
A Pilgrim and Two Turkeys, Back in My Day (Meyers Family Edition), Fred Judges a Book by Its Cover, The Newlywed Game (feat. Hilary and Larry Meyers, Alexi and Seth Meyers, and Tom and Joanne Ashe)

=== December ===
No.	Original release date	Guest(s)	Musical/entertainment guest(s)
765	December 3, 2018	Michael Douglas, Rufus Wainwright	Rufus Wainwright
Seth talks about his weekend at the Big Ten championship in Indianapolis, A Closer Look
766	December 4, 2018	Jake Tapper, Bill Burr	N/A
Amber Says What, Extreme Dog Shaming
767	December 5, 2018	Howie Mandel, Danielle Macdonald, Mehdi Hasan	N/A
Don't Drag Us Into This, A Closer Look
768	December 6, 2018	Alec Baldwin, Kate Bosworth	Bazzi
A Closer Look
769	December 10, 2018	Milo Ventimiglia, Jahana Hayes	Lukas Graham
I Have Some Thoughts On This, A Closer Look
770	December 11, 2018	Ken Jeong, Vanessa Hudgens, Nicole Byer	N/A
Ya Burnt
771	December 12, 2018	Lenny Kravitz, Anthony Atamanuik	N/A
A Closer Look, Late Night writer Ian Morgan performs "Mary Berry Christmas"
772	December 13, 2018	Natalie Portman, Adam Pally	N/A
A Closer Look, Who's Next?
773	December 17, 2018	Saoirse Ronan, Mike Birbiglia	Patrick Droney
A Closer Look, Mike Birbiglia reads a letter from Gerard Butler
774	December 18, 2018	Amy Adams, Stephan James, Nana Kwame Adjei-Brenyah	N/A
Seth Explains Teen Slang (Holiday Edition), Joke Bucket
775	December 19, 2018	John Cena, Rachel Brosnahan, Brian Posehn	N/A
A Closer Look
776	December 20, 2018	Lin-Manuel Miranda, Colin Quinn	N/A
Baby It's Cold Outside 2018, A Closer Look, Seth and Lin-Manuel Miranda drink a toast to the continuation of Brooklyn Nine-Nine
