= List of Late Night with Seth Meyers episodes (2014) =

- No. of episodes: 143

Release
- Original network: NBC

Season chronology
- ← Previous Next → 2015 episodes

This is the list of episodes for Late Night with Seth Meyers in 2014.

== 2014 ==
=== February ===
No.	Original release date	Guest(s)	Musical/entertainment guest(s)
1	February 24, 2014	Amy Poehler, Vice President Joe Biden	A Great Big World
Thank You Notes cold open, Venn Diagrams, Olympic Wrap-Up (Costas Vision)
2	February 25, 2014	Kanye West, Russell Wilson	Kanye West
Dissatisfied Audience Members
3	February 26, 2014	Kelly Ripa, Brad Paisley, Robyn Doolittle	Brad Paisley
Fake or Florida
4	February 27, 2014	Lena Dunham, Anthony Mackie	John Mayer Trio
This Week in Numbers, How to do New York City on just $40 a day
5	February 28, 2014	Ian McKellen and Patrick Stewart, Sophia Bush	Michael Che
Next Week's News

=== March ===
No.	Original release date	Guest(s)	Musical/entertainment guest(s)
6	March 3, 2014	Brian Williams, Naomi Campbell	The Hold Steady
First Week Glitches, Instagram Filters, Oscar Report
7	March 4, 2014	Ralph Fiennes, Allison Williams, Mike Birbiglia	N/A
What Are They Texting?, Woman Who Swears She's Done with New York
8	March 5, 2014	Ice-T and Coco, Nick Kroll	Rick Ross
Explainin' Ukraine, Seth Meyers from two weeks in the future
9	March 6, 2014	Martha Stewart, Lil Jon	N/A
Give It Up for Lent, Writers bothering Kimberly Thompson
10	March 7, 2014	Kenan Thompson, Johnny Weir and Tara Lipinski, Sarah Lewis	N/A
Extreme Dog Shaming, Dad Zone, 30 Rock Lunchtime Figure Skating Olympics
11	March 10, 2014	Andy Samberg, Busy Philipps, Ilana Glazer and Abbi Jacobson	N/A
Slogans
12	March 11, 2014	Rachel Maddow, Ike Barinholtz	N/A
Justin Bieber Deposition, Famous Ancestors of the Famous, Audience Marriage Proposal
13	March 12, 2014	Dr. Oz, Norman Reedus	American Authors
The Last Slice of the Pie Chart, Zombie in the audience
14	March 13, 2014	Tilda Swinton, Warren Buffett and Dan Gilbert, Carrie Brownstein	Lo-Fang
How They Reported It
15	March 14, 2014	Christian Slater, Neil deGrasse Tyson, Andy Daly	N/A
Famous Audience Members, Planet Pluto
16	March 17, 2014	Anderson Cooper, Alessandra Ambrosio and Behati Prinsloo	Iggy Azalea
Famous Quote First Drafts
17	March 18, 2014	Jason Sudeikis, Kathryn Hahn, David Remnick	N/A
The Late Night Players perform The New Yorker cartoons
18	March 19, 2014	Wendy Williams, Lena Headey	Eugene Mirman
Warning Labels
19	March 20, 2014	Greg Kinnear, Shailene Woodley	Band of Skulls
Incoherent British Hecklers, Old Video Games
20	March 21, 2014	John Leguizamo, Zosia Mamet, Kostya Kennedy	N/A
Celebrity Spelling Bee
21	March 24, 2014	Kathie Lee Gifford and Hoda Kotb, Kyle MacLachlan	Karmin
Venn Diagrams, Kathie Lee and Hoda's intervention
22	March 25, 2014	Kim Kardashian, Taran Killam, Arianna Huffington	N/A
New Yorkers voice their grievances
23	March 26, 2014	Timothy Olyphant, Cristin Milioti	Bleachers
Couple Things, Late Night Trading Cards
24	March 27, 2014	Jennifer Connelly, James Van Der Beek	Joe Mande
Famous Audience Members, What Happens After Seth Goes Home
25	March 31, 2014	Kevin Bacon, Kevin Millar and Sean Casey, Katherine Schwarzenegger	N/A
Honest Invitations

=== April ===
No.	Original release date	Guest(s)	Musical/entertainment guest(s)
26	April 1, 2014	Anna Kendrick, Nick Cannon	Brett Eldredge
Seth's opinions on shampoo, Winners & Losers
27	April 2, 2014	Bob Costas, Steve Coogan, The Kratt Brothers	Kongos
This Week in Numbers
28	April 3, 2014	Whoopi Goldberg, Judd Apatow, John Mulaney	Twenty One Pilots
Seth acknowledges David Letterman's retirement
29	April 7, 2014	Jeremy Piven, Mike Greenberg and Mike Golic	New Politics
Mad Men parody, How They Reported It
30	April 8, 2014	Kristen Wiig, Colin Hanks	Mario Batali
Mad Men parody, Celebrity Drunk Texts
31	April 9, 2014	Denis Leary, Thomas Middleditch	Fitz and the Tantrums
Mad Men parody, John Lutz: Undercover Intern
32	April 10, 2014	Edie Falco, Marlon Wayans	Nikki Glaser
Mad Men parody, Famous Audience Members
33	April 21, 2014	Senator John McCain, Billy Eichner	Jason Derulo
Venn Diagrams, Billy on the Street Games or Things We Made Up?
34	April 22, 2014	Sofía Vergara, Natalie Dormer, Jonah Keri	N/A
Seth says something to the Earth, Deep Google
35	April 23, 2014	Anthony Bourdain, Colin Quinn	Paramore
Instagram Filters, Grown-Up Annie
36	April 24, 2014	Cameron Diaz and Leslie Mann, Ronan Farrow	Gary Gulman
Back in My Day, Forced Friendship with Seth & Lester
37	April 28, 2014	Daniel Radcliffe, Jessica St. Clair and Lennon Parham	Twenty One Pilots
Couple Things, Famous Quote First Drafts
38	April 29, 2014	Matt Lauer and Savannah Guthrie, Bill Nye, Matt Walsh	N/A
Extreme Dog Shaming, Epilogues
39	April 30, 2014	Lucy Liu, Barney Frank	Parquet Courts
Fake or Florida

=== May ===
No.	Original release date	Guest(s)	Musical/entertainment guest(s)
40	May 1, 2014	Kiefer Sutherland, Rose Byrne, Richard Ayoade	N/A
Hug Your Cat Day, Famous Audience Members
41	May 5, 2014	Mindy Kaling, Jenna Elfman	Young the Giant
Seth explains net neutrality, Desk Piece Robot
42	May 6, 2014	Elliot Page, Lewis Black	Black Label Society
Seth gets into trouble on Cinco de Mayo, Famous Ancestors of the Famous
43	May 7, 2014	Anna Wintour, Sarah Jessica Parker, Rich Eisen	The 1975
Seth's nephew Derrick, Rich Eisen breaks down 2014 NFL Draft players
44	May 8, 2014	Jon Hamm, Larry King, Misty Copeland	N/A
This Week in Numbers
45	May 12, 2014	Chris O'Dowd, Emma Roberts	M.I.A.
The Last Slice of the Pie Chart, Grandma
46	May 13, 2014	Will Forte, Michael Symon	N/A
New Slogans, Second Chance Theatre
47	May 14, 2014	Tina Fey, Matthew Rhys	The Wild Feathers
Cheesy Brad and Cheesy Seth, Celebrity Spelling Bee (Dinosaur Week), Tina Fey bats autographed balls into the audience
48	May 15, 2014	Maya Rudolph, Lake Bell, Eddie Izzard	N/A
Seth's commencement speech, Maya Rudolph sings Taxi theme lyrics
49	May 19, 2014	Patrick Stewart, Adam Duritz	Counting Crows
Dinosaur Week, Warning Labels
50	May 20, 2014	James McAvoy, Wendi McLendon-Covey	Kumail Nanjiani
Late Night fan Timmy (Tim Robinson)
51	May 21, 2014	Jennifer Lawrence, Alan Cumming	Little Daylight
How They Reported It, Stink Mouth Pig Man
52	May 22, 2014	Hugh Jackman, Kevin Nealon	Ali Wong
Famous Audience Members, Seth counts Twitter submissions for favorite dinosaurs

=== June ===
No.	Original release date	Guest(s)	Musical/entertainment guest(s)
53	June 2, 2014	Nick Offerman and Megan Mullally, Gilbert Gottfried	Kip Moore
Venn Diagrams, Megan Mullally does a rap love song
54	June 3, 2014	Dennis Miller, Anna Chlumsky	Bastille
Seth's opinions on vitamins, Old Video Games
55	June 4, 2014	Demi Lovato, Dan Bakkedahl	Demi Lovato
New Apple Inc. iOS8 Operating System features, Seth and writers unable to finish sketch
56	June 5, 2014	Jonah Hill, Laura Dern	Nick Turner
Seth is a California Chrome fan, Grown-Up Annie
57	June 9, 2014	Steve Buscemi, Jake Tapper	Sia
Seth acknowledges Tracy Morgan's car accident, Seth tries to have some quiet time to himself, Extreme Dog Shaming, Jake Tapper does a sketch of Seth
58	June 10, 2014	Charlie Rose and Gayle King, Aidy Bryant, Linda Fairstein	N/A
Seth reads passages from Hard Choices, My New York with Tom Jankeloff
59	June 11, 2014	John Oliver, Natasha Lyonne	Paolo Nutini
Seth announces new sponsor TGI Fridays, Late Night Trading Cards
60	June 12, 2014	Gerard Butler, Tony Shalhoub	Myq Kaplan
Chris Rock makes an appearance during the monologue, Seth gives New York a birthday card, This Week in Numbers
61	June 16, 2014	Wanda Sykes, Piper Perabo	Stromae
Back in My Day, Famous Quote First Drafts
62	June 17, 2014	Robert Pattinson, America Ferrera, David Wain	N/A
Winners & Losers
63	June 18, 2014	Mike Myers and Shep Gordon, Whitney Cummings	Tove Lo
The Long Escalator Ride
64	June 19, 2014	Al Roker, Jenny Slate, Paul Haggis	N/A
Famous Audience Members, What Happens After Seth Goes Home

=== July ===
No.	Original release date	Guest(s)	Musical/entertainment guest(s)
65	July 7, 2014	Brian Williams, Christine Teigen	Charli XCX
Venn Diagrams
66	July 8, 2014	Andy Cohen, The Kratt Brothers, Jeff Koons	N/A
FredEx, New Yorkers voice their grievances
67	July 9, 2014	Taye Diggs, Andy Serkis	Neon Trees
Instagram Filters, Forced Friendship with Seth & Keith
68	July 10, 2014	Keri Russell, Kevin Millar and Sean Casey	Michelle Wolf
Seth goes through all five stages of grief in thirty seconds, LeBron James recruitment video, FredEx
69	July 14, 2014	Kate McKinnon, Pete Rose	Betty Who
New Slogans
70	July 15, 2014	Anna Paquin, Marc Maron, Elizabeth Karmel	N/A
FredEx, This Week in Numbers
71	July 16, 2014	Regis Philbin, John Henson	Broods
Deep Google
72	July 17, 2014	Julie Bowen, Brett Ratner	Ben Kronberg
FredEx, Famous Audience Members
73	July 21, 2014	Zach Braff, Jack Antonoff	Bleachers
The Last Slice of the Pie Chart, Seth reads affirmations about himself
74	July 22, 2014	Kate Hudson, David Remnick	N/A
FredEx, Seth apologizes to bad sponsors, The Late Night Players perform The New Yorker cartoons
75	July 23, 2014	Ricky Gervais, Zac Posen	G-Eazy
Seth shows things that did not make it to his new apartment, Seth wishes viewers a happy birthday and sends a message to his neighbor, Seth reads Zac Posen comments from Project Runway
76	July 24, 2014	Hank Azaria, Mary Lynn Rajskub, Brendan Gleeson	N/A
Seth's opinions on trees, FredEx
77	July 28, 2014	Carson Daly, Penn & Teller	Christina Perri
New Game of Thrones characters, Venn Diagrams, Penn & Teller do a magic trick
78	July 29, 2014	Maggie Gyllenhaal, Lee Pace, Scott Aukerman	N/A
FredEx, Late Night Holiday Origins
79	July 30, 2014	Chris Pratt, Laverne Cox	Big Data and Joywave
Least Trending Twitter Topics, Grandma
80	July 31, 2014	Ethan Hawke, Megyn Kelly, Paula Pell	N/A
FredEx, This Week in Numbers

=== August ===
No.	Original release date	Guest(s)	Musical/entertainment guest(s)
81	August 4, 2014	Joan Rivers, Josh Meyers	Rixton
Extreme Dog Shaming
82	August 5, 2014	Daniel Radcliffe, Neal Brennan, Morgan Spurlock	N/A
Happiness equation, FredEx, Last Line of the News Story, Late Night Mice
83	August 6, 2014	Clive Owen, Sarah Paulson	Chase Rice
Back in My Day, Grown-Up Annie
84	August 7, 2014	Michael Fassbender, Allison Tolman, Joshua Ferris	N/A
FredEx, Famous Audience Members
85	August 11, 2014	Jeff Bridges, Riki Lindhome and Kate Micucci	Strand of Oaks
FredEx, New Slogans, Riki Lindhome and Kate Micucci perform a song
86	August 12, 2014	Meredith Vieira, Dane DeHaan	Magic Man
Seth remembers Robin Williams, Stink Mouth Pig Man, Late Night Mice
87	August 13, 2014	Mickey Rourke, Matthew Weiner, Roger Bennett and Michael Davies	N/A
Fake or Florida, Mickey Rourke takes the ALS Ice Bucket Challenge
88	August 14, 2014	Taylor Swift, Boy George, Derek Waters	N/A
FredEx, Seth reads affirmations about himself, What Happens After Seth Goes Home

=== September ===
No.	Original release date	Guest(s)	Musical/entertainment guest(s)
89	September 2, 2014	Stephen Colbert, Amy Sedaris, Matthew Berry	N/A
Montage of Seth's greatest jumps on his old desk, FredEx, Venn Diagrams
90	September 3, 2014	Gwen Stefani, Andy Roddick	Counting Crows
Couple Things, Celebrity Spelling Bee, Stephen Colbert introduces Gwen Stefani
91	September 4, 2014	Heidi Klum, Kieran Culkin, Leslie Jones	N/A
FredEx, Seth acknowledges death of Joan Rivers, Famous Audience Members
92	September 8, 2014	Luke Wilson, Max Greenfield	Banks
Famous Quote First Drafts
93	September 9, 2014	Jeff Goldblum, Hannibal Buress, Jeffrey Kluger	N/A
Joke Check In, FredEx, This Week in Numbers, Jeff Goldblum sings "Jurassic Park" lyrics
94	September 10, 2014	Connie Britton, Ben McKenzie	Vance Joy
New version of Late Night theme song, Roll call for audience members, How They Reported It
95	September 11, 2014	Harry Connick Jr., Josh Charles	Nick Jonas
FredEx, Ya Burnt, Harry Connick, Jr. sings "Happy Birthday" to himself, Epilogues
96	September 15, 2014	Bill Hader, Nancy Pelosi	Walk the Moon
Four Downs
97	September 16, 2014	Craig Ferguson, Octavia Spencer, James Ellroy	N/A
Seth carves out some time for himself
98	September 17, 2014	Tina Fey, Adam Pally	Grouplove
Seth's nephew Derrick, Adam Pally does characters, Video of Paula Pell dancing
99	September 18, 2014	Julianna Margulies, Viggo Mortensen	Randy Liedtke
Ask Fred, Last Line of the News Story, Seth reads affirmations about himself
100	September 22, 2014	Martha Stewart, Ana Gasteyer	N/A
Seth says "That's great" too much, New Sponsors, Ana Gasteyer apologizes to Martha Stewart
101	September 23, 2014	Jennifer Hudson, Patrick Wilson	N/A
Least Trending Twitter Topics, Q&A, Inventor Spotlight
102	September 24, 2014	Stephen King, James Harden	Sam Hunt
Hidden Credits, Joke Bucket
103	September 25, 2014	Andy Samberg, Emily VanCamp	Roy Wood, Jr.
Ask Fred, Seth asks Andy Samberg which is cuter: his dog or Andy Samberg
104	September 29, 2014	Michael Che, Rosamund Pike	Colony House
Finally Some Good News, Venn Diagrams
105	September 30, 2014	Nathan Lane, "Weird Al" Yankovic, Garry Marshall	N/A
Ham Radio

=== October ===
No.	Original release date	Guest(s)	Musical/entertainment guest(s)
106	October 1, 2014	Neil Patrick Harris, Rita Wilson	The Both
This Week in Numbers, Amelia Earhart
107	October 2, 2014	Sarah Silverman, John Mulaney	N/A
Ask Fred, Ya Burnt
108	October 6, 2014	James Spader, Rachel Dratch	La Roux
Seth gets his computer password changed, New Slogans
109	October 7, 2014	Jeffrey Tambor, Retta, Impractical Jokers	N/A
FredEx, The two Jeremys from Gotham City
110	October 8, 2014	Matthew Broderick, Zachary Quinto	Glass Animals
Late Night Holiday Origins, Fred's Back advertisement, Extreme Dog Shaming
111	October 9, 2014	Robert Downey Jr., Emmy Rossum, Chris Gethard	N/A
CDC interview, FredEx, Famous Audience Members
112	October 13, 2014	Minnie Driver, Ike Barinholtz	Florida Georgia Line
Famous Quote First Drafts
113	October 14, 2014	Dane Cook, Nasim Pedrad, Azar Nafisi	N/A
How They Reported It, Animal Expert
114	October 15, 2014	Artie Lange, Nicole Richie	Royal Blood
Seth's opinions on math, Deep Google
115	October 16, 2014	Rachel Maddow, Matt Ryan, Wyatt Cenac	N/A
Ya Burnt
116	October 27, 2014	Carrie Underwood and Brad Paisley, Mark Consuelos	T.I.
Venn Diagrams, CDC interview
117	October 28, 2014	Amy Poehler, George R. R. Martin	Captain Sensible
This Week in Numbers, George R. R. Martin knights Seth, Amy Poehler and Seth quiz George R. R. Martin on lines from A Song of Ice and Fire
118	October 29, 2014	Edward Norton, Michael Lewis	Jessie Ware
Seth wishes viewers a happy birthday and sends a message to his neighbor, Seth takes questions from the audience
119	October 30, 2014	Zooey Deschanel, Ken Marino, Brad Meltzer	N/A
Halloween Costume Dos & Don'ts, Grown-Up Annie

=== November ===
No.	Original release date	Guest(s)	Musical/entertainment guest(s)
120	November 3, 2014	Kerry Washington, Michael C. Hall, Joe Hill	N/A
Last Line of the News Story
121	November 4, 2014	Martin Short, Coco Rocha, Simon Rich	N/A
Back in My Day, Coco Rocha shows Seth poses
122	November 5, 2014	Elijah Wood, Cecily Strong	Ella Henderson
Welcome Back, What Are They Texting?, Late Night Security Guards
123	November 6, 2014	Eva Longoria, Rob Riggle	Hozier
Seth Sits on a Park Bench and Thinks About Stuff, Ya Burnt
124	November 10, 2014	John Lithgow, Ben Feldman	Jenny Lewis
Venn Diagrams, Late Night Mice
125	November 11, 2014	David Hyde Pierce, Senator Elizabeth Warren, Matt Jones	N/A
Joke Bucket
126	November 12, 2014	Jack McBrayer, Gael García Bernal	Ex Hex
Barack Obama e-mails, Dr. Walter Aberdein
127	November 13, 2014	Taylor Schilling, Aaron Sorkin, Mike Lawrence	N/A
A Closer Look, The Sorkin Sketch
128	November 17, 2014	Steve Harvey, Robin Lord Taylor	Elle King
New Slogans, Michelle Wolf on various topics
129	November 18, 2014	Shaquille O'Neal, Eddie Redmayne, Gary Vaynerchuk	N/A
Old Video Games, Seth quizzes Shaquille O'Neal on film roles
130	November 19, 2014	Keira Knightley, Al Michaels	St. Lucia
Couple Things, This Week in Numbers, Epilogues
131	November 20, 2014	Russell Brand, Mayim Bialik, Fahim Anwar	N/A
Audience member wants Seth to do Bill Cosby joke, Seth reads affirmations about himself, Seth acknowledges death of Mike Nichols
132	November 24, 2014	John Goodman, Aasif Mandvi	Interpol
Seth's opinions on flossing, Least Trending Twitter Topics
133	November 25, 2014	Jason Sudeikis, Aubrey Plaza	N/A
Venn Diagrams, Aubrey Plaza gives Seth and the audience Grumpy Cat dolls, Second Chance Theatre
134	November 26, 2014	Allison Williams, Dan Patrick, Josh Beckerman	N/A
Seth promotes Hanes X-Temp products, Grandma, Allison Williams reads letter to R. L. Stine, Josh Beckerman does magic tricks
135	November 27, 2014	Josh Meyers, Larry Meyers & Hilary Meyers	N/A
Distinguished Guests, Ya Burnt: Thanksgiving Edition, How Well Do You Know Your Meyers?, Seth gives thanks

=== December ===
No.	Original release date	Guest(s)	Musical/entertainment guest(s)
136	December 8, 2014	Martin Freeman, Eliza Coupe	The Eeries
Seth comments on his mother's alcoholism, You've Come At the Worst Possible Time, New Sponsors
137	December 9, 2014	Rosario Dawson, Eugenio Derbez	Sturgill Simpson
Famous Quote First Drafts, Royal Watchers, Eugenio Derbez dubs Seth in Spanish
138	December 10, 2014	Cameron Diaz, Josh Radnor, Richard Engel	N/A
Ham Radio
139	December 11, 2014	Mark Wahlberg, Diane von Fürstenberg	Kyle Dunnigan
This Week in Numbers, Amber Ruffin shares her holiday plans
140	December 15, 2014	Curtis "50 Cent" Jackson, Patricia Clarkson	James Bay
Extreme Dog Shaming, 50 Cent public service announcement
141	December 16, 2014	James Corden, Vanessa Bayer, Robert Earl	N/A
Stink Mouth Pig Man, Vanessa Bayer reads note from Fred Armisen
142	December 17, 2014	Bill O'Reilly, Krysten Ritter	Jungle
Late Night Tree (Tree Talk with the Late Night Tree), Ya Burnt
143	December 18, 2014	Christoph Waltz, Uzo Aduba	Greg Warren
Bring It On!, Grown-Up Annie
