= Feresten =

Feresten is a surname. Notable people with the surname include:

- Spike Feresten (born 1964), American television writer, screenwriter, comedian, and television personality
- Wally Feresten (born 1965/1966), American television cue card handler and supervisor
