= List of Late Night with Seth Meyers episodes (2025) =

Season of television series

- No. of episodes: 141

Release
- Original network: NBC
- Original release: January 7 – December 18, 2025

Season chronology
- ← Previous; 2024 episodes Next → 2026 episodes

This is the list of episodes for Late Night with Seth Meyers in 2025.

== Episode numbering ==
The Peacock streaming service lists episodes by season number and then which episode it is within that season. To compute the season episode number from the absolute numbering given below, you must subtract the absolute number of the season's first episode and add 1. For instance, if we know that season 12 began at number 1562, then 1621 would correspond to S12 E60.

=== Seasons ===
- The first episode of calendar year 2025 is episode 44 of season 12. Season 12 began on September 23, 2024 at number 1562.

== 2025 ==
=== January ===
No.	Original release date	Guest(s)	Musical/entertainment guest(s)
1605	January 7, 2025	Quinta Brunson, Matt Rogers	N/A
A Closer Look
1606	January 8, 2025	Pamela Anderson, Rose Matafeo	N/A
A Closer Look
1607	January 9, 2025	Sebastian Stan, Auliʻi Cravalho	N/A
A Closer Look
1608	January 13, 2025	Graham Norton, Alex Wagner	N/A
A Closer Look
1609	January 14, 2025	Aidy Bryant, Joe Alwyn	Aaron Chen
Amber Says What
1610	January 15, 2025	Ben Stiller, Pauline Chalamet	N/A
A Closer Look, Amber Ruffin Calls Out Steve Bannon for Telling Elon Musk to "Go Back to Africa"
1611	January 16, 2025	Keke Palmer, Sarah Sherman	N/A
A Closer Look
1612	January 20, 2025	Christian Slater, Zosia Mamet	N/A
A Closer Look
1613	January 21, 2025	Adam Scott, Julia Fox, Greg Davies & Alex Horne	N/A
The "Leave Him Alone Guy" Sticks Up for Mike Johnson
1614	January 22, 2025	Michelle Yeoh, Kristen Welker	N/A
A Closer Look, Check The Scoreboard: White Men, New Year's Resolutions, Black Women; Wally the Cue Card Guy Accidentally Drops Seth's Cue Cards
1615	January 23, 2025	Nick Kroll, Britt Lower	N/A
A Closer Look, The Scollywood Minute: The Brutalist, Emilia Pérez and Wicked
1616	January 27, 2025	Sterling K. Brown, Lisa Ann Walter	N/A
A Closer Look
1617	January 28, 2025	Alan Cumming, Paul Skenes, Emilio Vitolo	N/A
Back in My Day
1618	January 29, 2025	Governor Gretchen Whitmer, James Austin Johnson	N/A
A Closer Look, Seth Lays Out 2025's Major Astronomical Events
1619	January 30, 2025	Will Forte, Conner O'Malley	N/A
A Closer Look

=== February ===
No.	Original release date	Guest(s)	Musical/entertainment guest(s)
1620	February 3, 2025	James Marsden, Cazzie David	N/A
A Closer Look
1621	February 4, 2025	Nicole Scherzinger, Roy Wood Jr., Michael Solomonov	N/A
Late Night White House Press Briefing
1622	February 5, 2025	Amy Schumer & Jillian Bell, George Wallace	N/A
A Closer Look
1623	February 6, 2025	Pete Davidson, Kaitlan Collins	N/A
A Closer Look
1624	February 10, 2025	Colman Domingo, Paula Pell	N/A
A Closer Look
1625	February 11, 2025	Bill Murray, Mikey Madison, James Anderson	N/A
Surprise Inspection!, Wally the Cue Card Guy Shows Seth his Daily Routine (in partnership with Ray-Ban Meta)
1626	February 12, 2025	Jon Hamm, Emily Spivey	N/A
A Closer Look
1627	February 13, 2025	Tom Hanks, Harper Steele	N/A
A Closer Look

=== March ===
No.	Original release date	Guest(s)	Musical/entertainment guest(s)
1628	March 3, 2025	Kate Hudson, John Turturro	N/A
A Closer Look; 2 Close 2 Look
1629	March 4, 2025	Fred Armisen, Naomi Ackie, Susan Morrison	N/A
Amber Says What; John Lutz promotes Maker's Mark
1630	March 5, 2025	Mindy Kaling, Governor Maura Healey	N/A
A Closer Look
1631	March 6, 2025	Kevin Hart, Annaleigh Ashford	N/A
A Closer Look; Day Drinking Slot Machine (Kevin Hart)
1632	March 10, 2025	Amanda Seyfried, Don Johnson	N/A
A Closer Look
1633	March 11, 2025	Robert De Niro, Kaitlin Olson, Chimamanda Ngozi Adichie	N/A
Ya Burnt
1634	March 12, 2025	Parker Posey, Michael Kosta	N/A
A Closer Look
1635	March 13, 2025	Colin Quinn, Natasha Rothwell	N/A
A Closer Look
1636	March 31, 2025	Nathan Lane, Adrienne Warren	N/A
Amber Ruffin addresses her dropped role from the White House Correspondents Dinner; A Closer Look

=== April ===
No.	Original release date	Guest(s)	Musical/entertainment guest(s)
1637	April 1, 2025	Ike Barinholtz, Michael Longfellow	N/A
Seth & Paul Rudd Go Day Drinking
1638	April 2, 2025	Rachel Maddow, Rob Delaney	N/A
A Closer Look
1639	April 3, 2025	Bill Burr, Aimee Lou Wood	N/A
A Closer Look
1640	April 7, 2025	Tracee Ellis Ross, Kit Connor	N/A
A Closer Look
1641	April 8, 2025	Walton Goggins, Sadie Sink	Rachel Kaly
Late Night White House Press Briefing
1642	April 9, 2025	Lizzo, Tim Robinson	N/A
A Closer Look
1643	April 10, 2025	Viola Davis, Amanda Peet	N/A
A Closer Look
1644	April 28, 2025	Adam Levine, Martha Stewart	N/A
A Closer Look
1645	April 29, 2025	Tina Fey, Gabriel Luna, Graydon Carter	N/A
Jokes Seth Can't Tell; Gabriel Luna and Arnold Schwarzenegger FaceTime
1646	April 30, 2025	Florence Pugh	N/A
A Closer Look; John Lutz: Product Tester

=== May ===
No.	Original release date	Guest(s)	Musical/entertainment guest(s)
1647	May 1, 2025	Blake Lively, Zarna Garg	N/A
A Closer Look
1648	May 5, 2025	John Oliver, Chloe Fineman	N/A
A Closer Look
1649	May 6, 2025	Jonathan Groff & Gracie Lawrence, Adria Arjona, Chef Eric Choi, David Yun, & Steve Choi	N/A
The Scollywood Minute: Superman, Mission: Impossible and More
1650	May 7, 2025	Anna Wintour & A$AP Rocky, Benito Skinner	N/A
A Closer Look
1651	May 8, 2025	Natasha Lyonne, Ben Mendelsohn	N/A
A Closer Look
1652	May 12, 2025	Olivia Munn; Adam Pally & Jon Gabrus	N/A
A Closer Look
1653	May 13, 2025	John Krasinski, Reba McEntire, Tony Gilroy	N/A
The Kind of Story We Need Right Now
1654	May 14, 2025	Tiffany Haddish, Leslie Bibb	N/A
A Closer Look
1655	May 15, 2025	Sarah Snook, Glenn Howerton	N/A
A Closer Look; Seth promotes Starbucks Iced Energy drinks

=== June ===
No.	Original release date	Guest(s)	Musical/entertainment guest(s)
1656	June 2, 2025	George Clooney; Jennifer Simard & Christopher Sieber	N/A
A Closer Look
1657	June 3, 2025	Shane Gillis & Steve Gerben, Ben Wang, Maria Reva	N/A
Amber Says What
1658	June 4, 2025	Benicio del Toro, Stephen Graham	N/A
A Closer Look
1659	June 5, 2025	Dakota Johnson, Questlove	N/A
A Closer Look
1660	June 9, 2025	Henry Winkler, Monica Barbaro	N/A
A Closer Look
1661	June 10, 2025	Joel McHale, Nico Parker, Atsuko Okatsuka	N/A
Back in My Day
1662	June 11, 2025	Conan O'Brien, Jenny Slate	N/A
A Closer Look
1663	June 12, 2025	Jeff Goldblum, Jason Isaacs	N/A
A Closer Look
1664	June 16, 2025	Arnold Schwarzenegger, Barry Diller	N/A
A Closer Look
1665	June 17, 2025	Christine Baranski, James Acaster, Meredith Hayden	N/A
Surprise Inspection!
1666	June 18, 2025	Cole Escola	N/A
A Closer Look, Seth gets interrupted by a wealthy audience member
1667	June 19, 2025	Chris Hayes, Mike Birbiglia	N/A
A Closer Look
1668	June 23, 2025	Uma Thurman, Matty Matheson	N/A
A Closer Look
1669	June 24, 2025	Charlize Theron, Jason Mantzoukas	N/A
A Closer Look
1670	June 25, 2025	Allison Williams, Jeffrey Dean Morgan	N/A
A Closer Look, Late Night writer Jeff Wright breaks down why bad news is actually good
1671	June 26, 2025	Mariska Hargitay, Jacob Soboroff, Mike Drucker	N/A
The "Leave Him Alone Guy" Sticks Up for Elon Musk

=== July ===
No.	Original release date	Guest(s)	Musical/entertainment guest(s)
1672	July 14, 2025	Nicole Scherzinger, Jack McBrayer	N/A
A Closer Look
1673	July 15, 2025	Kelly Ripa & Mark Consuelos, James Gunn, Tony Hawk	N/A
Amber Says What
1674	July 16, 2025	Timothy Olyphant, Emily Ratajkowski	N/A
A Closer Look
1675	July 17, 2025	Amy Sedaris, Lee Pace	N/A
A Closer Look
1676	July 21, 2025	Peter Dinklage, Jerrod Carmichael	N/A
A Closer Look
1677	July 22, 2025	Adam Sandler & Bad Bunny, Mary Beth Barone	N/A
Seth and his crew argue over the pronunciation of "croissant"; Christopher McDonald joins Adam Sandler and Bad Bunny
1678	July 23, 2025	LL Cool J, Vanessa Kirby	N/A
A Closer Look
1679	July 24, 2025	Billy Porter; Midge Purce & Emily Sonnett	N/A
12 Photographs; A Closer Look
1680	July 28, 2025	Sandra Oh, Erin Doherty	N/A
A Closer Look
1681	July 29, 2025	Taron Egerton, Tim Herlihy, Chase Sui Wonders	N/A
Late Night White House Press Briefing
1682	July 30, 2025	Pamela Anderson, Marc Maron	N/A
A Closer Look
1683	July 31, 2025	Liam Neeson, Danielle Brooks	N/A
A Closer Look; Aunt Pearl (Danielle Brooks)

=== August ===
No.	Original release date	Guest(s)	Musical/entertainment guest(s)
1684	August 4, 2025	Jenna Ortega, Cooper Koch	N/A
A Closer Look
1685	August 5, 2025	Bill Hader, Brittany Snow; Kat Sadler & Lizzie Davidson	N/A
At This Point in the Broadcast: Seth's opinions on reviews and surveys
1686	August 6, 2025	Pete Davidson, Taylor Schilling	N/A
A Closer Look
1687	August 7, 2025	Jean Smart, Molly Gordon	N/A
A Closer Look
1688	August 11, 2025	Seth Rogen, Mina Kimes	N/A
A Closer Look
1689	August 12, 2025	Zoë Kravitz, Ariana Madix, Chef Josh Capon	N/A
Surprise Inspection!
1690	August 13, 2025	Sharon Stone, Meghann Fahy	N/A
A Closer Look
1691	August 14, 2025	Pierce Brosnan, Sophie Turner	N/A
A Closer Look

=== September ===
No.	Original release date	Guest(s)	Musical/entertainment guest(s)
1692	September 2, 2025	Kumail Nanjiani, Domhnall Gleeson	N/A
A Closer Look
1693	September 3, 2025	Spike Lee, Rainn Wilson	N/A
A Closer Look
1694	September 4, 2025	Catherine Zeta-Jones, Julio Torres	N/A
A Closer Look
1695	September 8, 2025	James Corden, Ashlee Simpson Ross	N/A
A Closer Look
1696	September 9, 2025	Chance the Rapper, Governor Andy Beshear, Seth Reiss	N/A
Jokes Seth Can't Tell
1697	September 10, 2025	Josh Gad, Tom Pelphrey	N/A
A Closer Look
1698	September 11, 2025	America Ferrera, Hugh Bonneville	N/A
Seth discusses the assassination of Charlie Kirk; A Closer Look
1699	September 15, 2025	Jessica Chastain, Lily James	N/A
A Closer Look
1700	September 16, 2025	Margot Robbie & Colin Farrell; Eva Longoria	N/A
A Closer Look
1701	September 17, 2025	Brett Goldstein, Rob Reiner	N/A
Back in My Day
1702	September 18, 2025	Jason Bateman, Jinkx Monsoon	N/A
A Closer Look
1703	September 22, 2025	Jake Tapper, JADE	N/A
A Closer Look
1704	September 23, 2025	Bobby Cannavale, Lola Young	N/A
Seth, Matt & Bowen Go Day Drinking
1705	September 24, 2025	Ken Jeong, Louis Partridge	N/A
A Closer Look
1706	September 25, 2025	Timothy Olyphant, Tyriq Withers	N/A
A Closer Look
1707	September 29, 2025	Lionel Richie, Sarah Sherman	N/A
A Closer Look
1708	September 30, 2025	Kate McKinnon, Charlie Hunnam, Chelsea Frei	N/A
The Scollywood Minute: The Long Walk, The Exorcist; Introducing the Interns and How They Mock Me

=== October ===
No.	Original release date	Guest(s)	Musical/entertainment guest(s)
1709	October 1, 2025	Reneé Rapp, Christian Slater	N/A
A Closer Look
1710	October 2, 2025	Ayo Edebiri, David Sedaris	N/A
A Closer Look
1711	October 6, 2025	Kirsten Dunst, Tony Shalhoub	N/A
A Closer Look
1712	October 7, 2025	Channing Tatum, Megan Moroney, Jean-Georges Vongerichten	N/A
Late Night White House Press Briefing
1713	October 8, 2025	Taylor Swift	N/A
TAY/kover; A Closer Look
1714	October 9, 2025	Ryan Reynolds, Emilia Jones	N/A
A Closer Look
1715	October 10, 2025	Rose Byrne; Sean Casey & Mark DeRosa, Caleb Hearon	N/A
Surprise Inspection!
1716	October 20, 2025	Jesse Plemons; Erin Foster & Sara Foster	N/A
A Closer Look
1717	October 21, 2025	Larry David, Joel Kim Booster, Diane von Fürstenberg	N/A
The "Leave Him Alone Guy" Sticks Up for RFK Jr.
1718	October 22, 2025	Maya Rudolph, Adam Pally	N/A
A Closer Look; Maya Rudolph Tests Her Bird Knowledge with an Ornithologist (Paula Pell)
1719	October 23, 2025	Leslie Jones, Amelia Dimoldenberg	N/A
A Closer Look
1720	October 27, 2025	Ethan Hawke, Zadie Smith	N/A
A Closer Look
1721	October 28, 2025	Reese Witherspoon & Harlan Coben, Chloe Fineman, Henry Laporte	N/A
Amber Says What
1722	October 29, 2025	Isla Fisher, Judd Apatow	N/A
A Closer Look
1723	October 30, 2025	Emma Stone, Florence Welch	N/A
A Closer Look; Seth Checks Out Audience Member Halloween Costumes

=== November ===
No.	Original release date	Guest(s)	Musical/entertainment guest(s)
1724	November 3, 2025	Nikki Glaser, Matthew Macfadyen	N/A
A Closer Look
1725	November 4, 2025	Tim Robinson & Zach Kanin, Stavros Halkias	N/A
Ya Burnt
1726	November 5, 2025	Alex Rodriguez, Dakota Fanning	N/A
A Closer Look
1727	November 6, 2025	Tiffany Haddish, Cristin Milioti, Joachim Trier	N/A
A Closer Look
1728	November 10, 2025	Michael Shannon, Elizabeth Olsen	N/A
A Closer Look
1729	November 11, 2025	Joel Edgerton, Elle Fanning, Edgar Wright	N/A
Jokes Seth Can't Tell
1730	November 12, 2025	Matthew Broderick, Dave Franco	N/A
A Closer Look
1731	November 13, 2025	Claire Danes, Callum Turner	N/A
A Closer Look
1732	November 17, 2025	Jeff Goldblum, Jane Krakowski	N/A
A Closer Look
1733	November 18, 2025	Brendan Fraser, Chloë Grace Moretz	Greta Titelman
Back in My Day
1734	November 19, 2025	Jonathan Bailey, Mary Steenburgen	N/A
A Closer Look; Bailey's childhood best friend Kit Buchan makes an appearance during the interview
1735	November 20, 2025	Cynthia Erivo, Brooks Wheelan	Brooks Wheelan
A Closer Look
1736	November 24, 2025	Daniel Radcliffe, Jonathan Groff & Lindsay Mendez, Taran Killam	N/A
A Closer Look
1737	November 25, 2025	Tom Hanks, Matt Rogers	N/A
A Closer Look
1738	November 26, 2025	Hank Azaria, Renate Reinsve; Ejae, Audrey Nuna & Rei Ami	N/A
Surprise Inspection!
1739	November 27, 2025	The Meyers Family	N/A
Seth Surprises His Kids with a Late Night Interview; Ya Brined

=== December ===
No.	Original release date	Guest(s)	Musical/entertainment guest(s)
1740	December 8, 2025	Sabrina Carpenter, Josh O'Connor	N/A
A Closer Look
1741	December 9, 2025	Amy Sedaris, Brandon Sklenar, Kareem Rahma	N/A
Amber Says What; Seth Shares the U.S. Mint's Most Valuable Pennies
1742	December 10, 2025	Amanda Seyfried, Andrew Scott	N/A
A Closer Look
1743	December 11, 2025	Ike Barinholtz, Ashley Padilla	N/A
A Closer Look
1744	December 15, 2025	Gwyneth Paltrow, Brad Paisley	N/A
A Closer Look; Seth pays tribute to Rob Reiner
1745	December 16, 2025	Jack Black, Ella Purnell	N/A
Seth & Sabrina Go Day Drinking
1746	December 17, 2025	Kate Hudson, Odessa A'zion	N/A
A Closer Look
1747	December 18, 2025	Ariana Grande, Fran Drescher	N/A
A Closer Look
