= List of Late Night with Seth Meyers episodes (2022) =

- No. of episodes: 136

Release
- Original network: NBC
- Original release: January 3 – December 15, 2022

Season chronology
- ← Previous; 2021 episodes Next → 2023 episodes

This is the list of episodes for Late Night with Seth Meyers in 2022.

== 2022 ==
=== January ===
No.	Original release date	Guest(s)	Musical/entertainment guest(s)
1238	January 3, 2022	Sterling K. Brown, Chrissy Metz & Justin Hartley, David Byrne	N/A
A Closer Look
1239	January 10, 2022	Senator Bernie Sanders, Lindsey Vonn	N/A
A Closer Look
1240	January 11, 2022	John Cena, Ana Gasteyer, Hanya Yanagihara	N/A
The Kind of Story We Need Right Now
1241	January 12, 2022	Isla Fisher, James Wolk	N/A
A Closer Look
1242	January 13, 2022	Tracee Ellis Ross, Stacey Abrams	N/A
A Closer Look
1243	January 17, 2022	Aidy Bryant, John Early	N/A
A Closer Look
1244	January 18, 2022	Jeremy Irons, Hilary Duff, Jeff Wright	N/A
Amber Says What
1245	January 19, 2022	Judi Dench, Huma Abedin	Teddy Swims
A Closer Look
1246	January 20, 2022	Ricky Gervais, Edi Patterson	N/A
Dammit, I Agree with Trump, A Closer Look
1247	January 24, 2022	Milo Ventimiglia, James Austin Johnson	N/A
A Closer Look
1248	January 25, 2022	Justice Sonia Sotomayor, Jim Belushi, Mike Schur	N/A
Surprise Inspection!
1249	January 26, 2022	Cynthia Nixon, Annaleigh Ashford	Del Water Gap
A Closer Look
1250	January 27, 2022	Kenan Thompson, Tom Riley, Renate Reinsve	N/A
A Closer Look
1251	January 31, 2022	Ike Barinholtz, Bridget Everett	N/A
A Closer Look, John Lutz has a question for Seth

=== February ===
No.	Original release date	Guest(s)	Musical/entertainment guest(s)
1252	February 1, 2022	David Letterman	Adam Duritz
Jokes Seth Can't Tell, David Letterman and Seth celebrate the 40th anniversary of the premiere of Late Night
1253	February 2, 2022	Charlie Day, Sam Richardson	N/A
A Closer Look
1254	February 21, 2022	Tom Holland, Alana Haim	N/A
A Closer Look, Alana Haim asks an audience member a trivia question
1255	February 22, 2022	Anthony Anderson, Margaret Qualley, Jon Barinholtz	N/A
Back in My Day
1256	February 23, 2022	Billie Eilish, Mayor Eric Adams	N/A
A Closer Look
1257	February 24, 2022	Simon Cowell, Maude Apatow	N/A
A Closer Look
1258	February 28, 2022	John Oliver, Jason Clarke	N/A
A Closer Look

=== March ===
No.	Original release date	Guest(s)	Musical/entertainment guest(s)
1259	March 1, 2022	Amanda Seyfried, Harvey Fierstein, Frank Bruni	N/A
Ben Warheit performs a heartfelt monologue to his father, The McRib; Amber Ruffin and Jenny Hagel performed an original song inspired by Ketanji Brown Jackson
1260	March 2, 2022	Courteney Cox, Connor Ratliff	Benson Boone
A Closer Look
1261	March 3, 2022	Amy Poehler, Jeffrey Wright	N/A
A Closer Look
1262	March 7, 2022	Chris Hayes, Paul Dano	Lucy Dacus
Trump Is Right, A Closer Look
1263	March 8, 2022	Leslie Jones, Topher Grace, Brad Meltzer	N/A
Dina Gusovsky speaks on the 2022 Russian invasion of Ukraine
1264	March 9, 2022	Sandra Oh, Thomas Middleditch	N/A
A Closer Look
1265	March 10, 2022	Taylor Schilling, Chris Redd	N/A
A Closer Look
1266	March 14, 2022	Holly Hunter, Patti Harrison, Catherine Cohen	N/A
A Closer Look
1267	March 15, 2022	Kid Cudi, Quinta Brunson, Rhys Darby	N/A
Surprise Inspection!, Amber Ruffin talks about Naomi Osaka
1268	March 16, 2022	Kenneth Branagh, Questlove	Vundabar
A Closer Look
1269	March 17, 2022	Penélope Cruz, Hugh Dancy, Paul Feig	N/A
A Closer Look
1270	March 28, 2022	Mariska Hargitay & Christopher Meloni, Rachel Dratch	N/A
Amber Ruffin recaps the 94th Academy Awards, A Closer Look
1271	March 30, 2022	Andy Cohen, Jeff Foxworthy	N/A
A Closer Look
1272	March 31, 2022	Ben Stiller, Rose Matafeo	N/A
A Closer Look

=== April ===
No.	Original release date	Guest(s)	Musical/entertainment guest(s)
1273	April 4, 2022	Leslie Mann, Robin Thede	N/A
A Closer Look
1274	April 5, 2022	Matthew Broderick, Judd Apatow, Quincy Isaiah	N/A
Seth's opinions on seasonal foods
1275	April 6, 2022	Sienna Miller, Jerrod Carmichael	Caitlyn Smith
A Closer Look
1276	April 7, 2022	Joe Manganiello, Alex Edelman	N/A
A Closer Look
1277	April 18, 2022	Jesse Williams, Jordan Klepper	N/A
A Closer Look
1278	April 19, 2022	Tina Fey, Craig Robinson, Marc Bernardin	N/A
Jokes Seth Can't Tell, Craig Robinson brings a knapsack teddy bear with Seth's face on it
1279	April 20, 2022	Kaley Cuoco, Aasif Mandvi	Amyl and the Sniffers
A Closer Look
1280	April 21, 2022	Tiffany Haddish, Chloë Sevigny	Company
A Closer Look
1281	April 25, 2022	Terry Crews, Vanessa Bayer	Sam Fender
A Closer Look
1282	April 26, 2022	Oscar Isaac, Zazie Beetz, Phil Wang	N/A
Back in My Day
1283	April 27, 2022	Paul Bettany, Kiernan Shipka	Fontaines D.C.
A Closer Look
1284	April 28, 2022	Andrew Garfield, Mary-Louise Parker	N/A
A Closer Look, Two Disney Adults On Disney's And Florida's "Don't Say Gay" Bill

=== May ===
No.	Original release date	Guest(s)	Musical/entertainment guest(s)
1285	May 2, 2022	Laura Linney, Melanie Lynskey, Geoffrey Zakarian	N/A
A Closer Look
1286	May 3, 2022	Bill Hader, Minnie Driver, Hernan Diaz	N/A
Two Representatives from the Democratic National Convention, Ben Warheit impersonates Billy Joel
1287	May 4, 2022	Amy Schumer, Jennifer Grey	Stephen Sanchez
A Closer Look
1288	May 5, 2022	Sutton Foster & Hugh Jackman, Ali Wentworth	N/A
A Closer Look
1289	May 9, 2022	Bob Odenkirk, Bobby Moynihan	N/A
A Closer Look
1290	May 10, 2022	Sam Rockwell, Beto O'Rourke, Mo Amer	N/A
Surprise Inspection!
1291	May 11, 2022	Ken Jeong, Paula Pell	PUP
A Closer Look
1292	May 12, 2022	Amy Sedaris, Michael R. Jackson	A Strange Loop
A Closer Look
1293	May 16, 2022	Miley Cyrus, Jenna Fischer & Angela Kinsey	N/A
Seth acknowledges the 2022 Buffalo shooting at the top of the program, and Amber Ruffin offers her opinions, A Closer Look
1294	May 17, 2022	Chelsea Handler, Martha Stewart, Allegra Hyde	N/A
Ya Burnt
1295	May 18, 2022	Sarah Silverman, Jeffrey Donovan	Sleaford Mods
A Closer Look
1296	May 19, 2022	Ricky Gervais, Emmy Rossum	Ashe
A Closer Look
1297	May 23, 2022	Billy Crystal, Samara Weaving	N/A
A Closer Look
1298	May 24, 2022	Drew Barrymore, Chris Parnell, Chef Kwame Onwuachi	N/A
Jeff Wright offers opinions on current events
1299	May 25, 2022	Senator Chris Murphy, Chloe Fineman	Danielle Ponder
Seth acknowledges the Robb Elementary School shooting at the top of the program, A Closer Look
1300	May 26, 2022	Jon Hamm, Julio Torres	Six the Musical
A Closer Look

=== June ===
No.	Original release date	Guest(s)	Musical/entertainment guest(s)
1301	June 6, 2022	Michael Che, Kylie Minogue, Leila Mottley	N/A
A Closer Look
1302	June 7, 2022	Adam Sandler, James Patterson	N/A
Day Drinking with Post Malone
1303	June 8, 2022	Desus & Mero, Jensen Ackles	Tove Lo
A Closer Look
1304	June 9, 2022	Jeff Goldblum, D'Arcy Carden	N/A
A Closer Look
1305	June 13, 2022	Christine Baranski, Matthew Goode	Jewel
A Closer Look
1306	June 14, 2022	Miles Teller, Busy Philipps, Jana Schmieding	N/A
Jenny Hagel comments on the Proud Boys' targeting a Pride parade, Best Case Scenario, Worst Case Scenario and One with Bees
1307	June 15, 2022	Tracy Morgan, Jabari Banks	N/A
A Closer Look
1308	June 16, 2022	Emma Thompson, Jack Quaid, the cast of Three Busy Debras	N/A
A Closer Look
1309	June 20, 2022	Adam Scott, the cast of Impractical Jokers	N/A
A Closer Look
1310	June 21, 2022	Tom Hanks, Elliot Page, Chef Mason Hereford	N/A
The Kind of Story We Need Right Now
1311	June 22, 2022	John Mulaney, Jenny Slate	Pheelz
A Closer Look
1312	June 23, 2022	Maya Rudolph, Werner Herzog	N/A
Hey!
1313	June 27, 2022	Beanie Feldstein, Matthew Modine	Billy Strings
The writers comment on the overturning of Roe v. Wade and introduce Alexis McGill Johnson, Supreme Court of the United States Debate on What's Next to Be Overturned
1314	June 28, 2022	Wanda Sykes, Kesha, Patrick Radden Keefe	N/A
A Closer Look, Jokes Seth Can't Tell
1315	June 29, 2022	Steve Carell, Machine Gun Kelly	Ingrid Andress
A Closer Look
1316	June 30, 2022	Senator Elizabeth Warren, Cazzie David	N/A
A Closer Look

=== July ===
No.	Original release date	Guest(s)	Musical/entertainment guest(s)
1317	July 18, 2022	Issa Rae, Nikki Glaser	N/A
A Closer Look
1318	July 19, 2022	Lisa Kudrow, Alex Holder	Hoodo Hersi
Surprise Inspection!
1319	July 20, 2022	Katie Holmes, Joe Pera	N/A
A Closer Look
1320	July 21, 2022	Daniel Kaluuya, Jordan Peele, Keke Palmer & Brandon Perea	N/A
A Closer Look
1321	July 25, 2022	Rhea Seehorn, Jeremy Allen White	N/A
A Closer Look
1322	July 26, 2022	Ethan Hawke, Retta, Iman Vellani	N/A
Back in My Day

=== August ===
No.	Original release date	Guest(s)	Musical/entertainment guest(s)
1323	August 3, 2022	Billy Porter, Jane Mayer	N/A
A Closer Look
1324	August 4, 2022	LL Cool J, Cristin Milioti	N/A
A Closer Look

=== September ===
No.	Original release date	Guest(s)	Musical/entertainment guest(s)
1325	September 6, 2022	Christine Baranski, Ryan Fitzpatrick	N/A
A Closer Look
1326	September 7, 2022	Danny DeVito, Tegan and Sara	Tegan and Sara
Amber Says What
1327	September 8, 2022	Gwen Stefani, Grant Morrison	N/A
A Closer Look
1328	September 13, 2022	Rosie O'Donnell, Kevin Smith, Megan Giddings	N/A
Surprise Inspection!
1329	September 14, 2022	Lena Dunham, Jo Koy	N/A
A Closer Look
1330	September 15, 2022	Hillary Clinton & Chelsea Clinton, Kate Berlant	N/A
A Closer Look
1331	September 19, 2022	John Oliver, Quinta Brunson	Courtney Barnett
A Closer Look
1332	September 20, 2022	Ana de Armas, Reba McEntire, Ms. Pat	N/A
Jokes Seth Can't Tell, Ben Warheit impersonates Billy Joel
1333	September 21, 2022	Billy Eichner, Beth Ditto	N/A
A Closer Look
1334	September 22, 2022	Alan Cumming, Bobby Moynihan	N/A
A Closer Look
1335	September 26, 2022	Senator Bernie Sanders, Chad Kroeger & JT Parr	N/A
A Closer Look
1336	September 27, 2022	Nick Kroll, Stephen "Steve-O" Glover, Dick Ebersol	N/A
Ya Burnt
1337	September 28, 2022	Timothy Olyphant, Rachel Sennott	N/A
A Closer Look
1338	September 29, 2022	Colin Jost, Paul Mescal	5 Seconds of Summer
A Closer Look

=== October ===
No.	Original release date	Guest(s)	Musical/entertainment guest(s)
1339	October 3, 2022	Constance Wu, Ramy Youssef	N/A
A Closer Look
1340	October 4, 2022	Queen Latifah, Sarah Sherman, Celeste Ng	N/A
Wait, What?
1341	October 5, 2022	Kelly Ripa; Fred Armisen, Ana Fabrega, & Julio Torres	Ashley McBryde
A Closer Look
1342	October 6, 2022	Hasan Minhaj, Tony Hale	N/A
A Closer Look
1343	October 10, 2022	Vice President Kamala Harris, Geena Davis	N/A
A Closer Look
1344	October 11, 2022	Brendan Gleeson & Colin Farrell, Kaitlyn Dever	N/A
Michael Myers makes an appearance
1345	October 12, 2022	Pierce Brosnan, Sharon Horgan	Craig Finn
A Closer Look
1346	October 13, 2022	Johnny Knoxville, Jake Lacy	Pusha T
A Closer Look
1347	October 31, 2022	Ice-T, John Irving	Rina Sawayama
A Closer Look

=== November ===
No.	Original release date	Guest(s)	Musical/entertainment guest(s)
1348	November 1, 2022	Jake Tapper, Sheryl Lee Ralph, Sohla El-Waylly	N/A
Jeff Wright leads a support group for voters
1349	November 2, 2022	Daniel Radcliffe & "Weird Al" Yankovic, Kerry Condon	Kurt Vile and the Violators
A Closer Look
1350	November 3, 2022	Cecily Strong, Evan Rachel Wood	N/A
A Closer Look, DNC Emails
1351	November 7, 2022	Gayle King, Bobby Cannavale	N/A
A Closer Look
1352	November 9, 2022	Florence Pugh, Steve Kornacki	N/A
LNSM Decision Desk Projects, A Closer Look
1353	November 10, 2022	Tracy Morgan, James Acaster	N/A
A Closer Look
1354	November 14, 2022	Chelsea Handler, Martin McDonagh	N/A
A Closer Look
1355	November 15, 2022	Quentin Tarantino, Emily Ratajkowski, Seth Reiss & Will Tracy	N/A
Getting to Know the Rockefeller Center Christmas Tree, Amber Says What
1356	November 16, 2022	John Leguizamo, Zoe Kazan	Paolo Nutini
A Closer Look
1357	November 17, 2022	David Duchovny, Sarah Jones	N/A
A Closer Look
1358	November 21, 2022	Jim Parsons, Amber Ruffin & Lacey Lamar	N/A
Jenny Hagel discusses the Colorado Springs nightclub shooting, A Closer Look
1359	November 22, 2022	Kumail Nanjiani, Matt Rogers	Titanique
Seth's opinions on artificial intelligence
1360	November 23, 2022	Bruce Springsteen, Mike Birbiglia	N/A
Surprise Inspection!
1361	November 24, 2022	The Meyers family	N/A
A Closer Look, Josh Meyers performed a song about being vegan on Thanksgiving

=== December ===
No.	Original release date	Guest(s)	Musical/entertainment guest(s)
1362	December 5, 2022	Lea Michele, Janelle James	Lea Michele
A Closer Look
1363	December 6, 2022	Chris Hayes, Charlotte Nicdao	N/A
The Kind of Story We Need Right Now, Amy Poehler & Maya Rudolph make a surprise appearance
1364	December 7, 2022	Jesse Eisenberg, Meghann Fahy	N/A
A Closer Look
1365	December 8, 2022	Catherine Zeta-Jones, Hong Chau	N/A
A Closer Look
1366	December 12, 2022	Aubrey Plaza, Bashir Salahuddin & Diallo Riddle	N/A
A Closer Look
1367	December 13, 2022	Kate Hudson, Chefs Angie Rito & Scott Tacinelli	N/A
Seth & Lizzo Go Day Drinking
1368	December 14, 2022	Janelle Monáe, Paul Dano	N/A
A Closer Look
1369	December 15, 2022	Paul Bettany, Lily Collins	N/A
A Closer Look
