= List of Late Night with Seth Meyers episodes (2023) =

- No. of episodes: 96

Release
- Original network: NBC
- Original release: January 3 – December 21, 2023

Season chronology
- ← Previous; 2022 episodes Next → 2024 episodes

This is the list of episodes for Late Night with Seth Meyers in 2023. Production was ceased from May 2 to October 2 due to the 2023 Writers Guild of America strike amid the 2023 Hollywood labor disputes.

== 2023 ==
=== January ===
No.	Original release date	Guest(s)	Musical/entertainment guest(s)
1370	January 3, 2023	Michael Shannon, Danielle Brooks	N/A
A Closer Look
1371	January 4, 2023	Brendan Fraser, Roy Wood Jr.	N/A
Amber Says What
1372	January 5, 2023	Jordan Peele, Melissa Rauch	N/A
A Closer Look
1373	January 9, 2023	Allison Williams, S. S. Rajamouli	N/A
A Closer Look
1374	January 10, 2023	Tom Hanks, Jessie Buckley, Stephen Markley	N/A
Back in My Day
1375	January 11, 2023	Gerard Butler, Nico Parker	Inhaler
A Closer Look
1376	January 12, 2023	Anna Kendrick, John Larroquette	N/A
A Closer Look
1377	January 16, 2023	Leslie Jones, Rosie Perez	N/A
A Closer Look
1378	January 17, 2023	Common, Jonathan Lemire	Some Like It Hot
Jokes Seth Can't Tell
1379	January 18, 2023	George Lopez, Sadie Sink	N/A
A Closer Look
1380	January 19, 2023	Kenan Thompson, Jinkx Monsoon	N/A
A Closer Look, Pernice LaFonk (Kenan Thompson)
1381	January 23, 2023	Hilary Duff, Kim Petras	Kim Petras
A Closer Look
1382	January 24, 2023	Ana Gasteyer, Bomani Jones, Sam Morrison	N/A
Bringing Down the House
1383	January 25, 2023	Colin Quinn, Gabrielle Union	N/A
A Closer Look
1384	January 26, 2023	Alex Wagner, Bowen Yang	N/A
A Closer Look
1385	January 30, 2023	Christopher Meloni, D'Arcy Carden	N/A
A Closer Look
1386	January 31, 2023	Terry Crews, Andrew Dismukes, Rian Johnson	N/A
Surprise Inspection!

=== February ===
No.	Original release date	Guest(s)	Musical/entertainment guest(s)
1387	February 1, 2023	Natasha Lyonne, Adam Pally	N/A
A Closer Look
1388	February 2, 2023	Alan Cumming, Jonathan Groff	N/A
A Closer Look
1389	February 6, 2023	Taylor Schilling, Eddie Izzard	N/A
A Closer Look
1390	February 7, 2023	Reese Witherspoon, Paula Pell, Chef Michael Solomonov	N/A
Amber Says What
1391	February 8, 2023	Judd Hirsch, Justice Smith	Regina Spektor
A Closer Look
1392	February 9, 2023	Fred Armisen, Penn Badgley	N/A
A Closer Look, Catching Up with Seth & Fred
1393	February 13, 2023	David Harbour, Kathryn Newton	N/A
A Closer Look
1394	February 14, 2023	Paul Rudd	N/A
Ya Burnt, Popsicle Schtick
1395	February 15, 2023	Pedro Pascal, Taye Diggs	N/A
A Closer Look
1396	February 16, 2023	Tina Fey, Nate Bargatze	N/A
A Closer Look
1397	February 27, 2023	Woody Harrelson, Niall Horan	N/A
A Closer Look
1398	February 28, 2023	Rachel Brosnahan, Matthew Rhys, Francia Raisa	N/A
Jokes Seth Can't Tell, Matthew Rhys and Seth have a leek-eating contest and Rhys brings out rarebit

=== March ===
No.	Original release date	Guest(s)	Musical/entertainment guest(s)
1399	March 1, 2023	Jim Gaffigan, Richard Kind	N/A
A Closer Look
1400	March 2, 2023	Jonathan Majors, Riley Keough	N/A
A Closer Look
1401	March 6, 2023	Hank Azaria, Diane Morgan	N/A
A Closer Look
1402	March 7, 2023	Ike Barinholtz, Melissa Barrera, Margaret Atwood	N/A
Back in My Day
1403	March 8, 2023	Nick Kroll, Zoë Chao	Zara Larsson
A Closer Look
1404	March 9, 2023	Adam Driver, Adam Brody	N/A
A Closer Look
1405	March 13, 2023	John Oliver	N/A
A Closer Look, Ben Warheit addresses being a Nepo baby
1406	March 14, 2023	James Spader, Ian McShane, Ms. Pat	N/A
The Kind of Story We Need Right Now
1407	March 15, 2023	Bryan Cranston, Nicole Byer	keshi
A Closer Look
1408	March 16, 2023	Jason Sudeikis, Annaleigh Ashford	N/A
A Closer Look
1409	March 27, 2023	Jeff Goldblum	Jeff Goldblum & The Mildred Snitzer Orchestra
A Closer Look
1410	March 28, 2023	Andy Samberg, Chris O'Dowd	N/A
A Closer Look, The Spitroast (with Andy Samberg)
1411	March 29, 2023	Adam Scott, Jeff Tweedy	Wilco
A Closer Look
1412	March 30, 2023	Taron Egerton, Maude Apatow, Jessi Klein	N/A
A Closer Look

=== April ===
No.	Original release date	Guest(s)	Musical/entertainment guest(s)
1413	April 3, 2023	Rob Lowe & John Owen Lowe, Judd Winick	Ruston Kelly
A Closer Look
1414	April 4, 2023	Jason Bateman, Rep. Alexandria Ocasio-Cortez	N/A
A Closer Look
1415	April 5, 2023	Chris Pratt, Ali Wong	The Hold Steady
Jeff Wright speaks on current events, A Closer Look, Chris Pratt brings Seth a Super Mario Bros. Movie coin
1416	April 6, 2023	Matt Damon, Kristin Chenoweth	N/A
A Closer Look
1417	April 24, 2023	Laura Dern, Miranda Lambert	N/A
A Closer Look
1418	April 25, 2023	Nathan Lane, Rep. Katie Porter	& Juliet
Surprise Inspection!
1419	April 26, 2023	Keri Russell, Graham Norton	N/A
A Closer Look
1420	April 27, 2023	Amy Poehler, Lucinda Williams	N/A
A Closer Look

=== May ===
No.	Original release date	Guest(s)	Musical/entertainment guest(s)
1421	May 1, 2023	Chance the Rapper, Parker Posey	N/A
A Closer Look

=== October ===
No.	Original release date	Guest(s)	Musical/entertainment guest(s)
1422	October 2, 2023	N/A	N/A
An extended Closer Look (To the Max)
1423	October 3, 2023	Tracy Morgan, Chris Hayes	N/A
Jokes Seth Can't Tell
1424	October 4, 2023	Nick Offerman, Siobhan Fallon Hogan	Jungle
A Closer Look
1425	October 5, 2023	Anne Hathaway, David Byrne	N/A
A Closer Look
1426	October 9, 2023	Amy Sedaris, Colin Quinn	N/A
A Closer Look
1427	October 10, 2023	Bob Odenkirk, Marcello Hernández, Aparna Nancherla	N/A
Surprise Inspection!
1428	October 11, 2023	Reba McEntire, Werner Herzog	Tom Odell
A Closer Look
1429	October 12, 2023	Bowen Yang, Jason Blum	N/A
A Closer Look
1430	October 16, 2023	Kelly Clarkson, Erin Andrews	Ryan Beatty
A Closer Look
1431	October 17, 2023	Josh Gad, Joe Pera, Chef Ayesha Nurdjaja	N/A
Ya Burnt
1432	October 18, 2023	Nathan Lane, Lauren Schuker Blum & Rebecca Angelo	N/A
A Closer Look
1433	October 19, 2023	Billy Porter, Darren Aronofsky	N/A
A Closer Look
1434	October 23, 2023	John Oliver, Aaron Jackson & Josh Sharp	N/A
A Closer Look
1435	October 24, 2023	Nate Bargatze, Andrew Rannells, Jesmyn Ward	N/A
Race for the White House
1436	October 25, 2023	Allison Williams, Fisher Stevens	N/A
A Closer Look
1437	October 26, 2023	Morgan Freeman, McKay Coppins	N/A
A Closer Look
1438	October 30, 2023	David Duchovny, Reneé Rapp	Reneé Rapp
A Closer Look
1439	October 31, 2023	Meg Ryan, Kaitlan Collins, Sarah Cooper	N/A
Back in My Day, Late Night's Two Sentence Horror Stories

=== November ===
No.	Original release date	Guest(s)	Musical/entertainment guest(s)
1440	November 1, 2023	Henry Winkler, Brendan Hunt	N/A
A Closer Look
1441	November 2, 2023	Willie Geist, James Austin Johnson	N/A
A Closer Look
1442	November 6, 2023	Jennifer Hudson, Matt Rogers	N/A
A Closer Look
1443	November 7, 2023	Rachel Maddow, Jeff Tweedy, Ms. Pat	N/A
Amber Says What
1444	November 8, 2023	Leslie Jones, Judd Apatow	Rett Madison
A Closer Look
1445	November 9, 2023	Hilary Duff, Please Don't Destroy	N/A
A Closer Look
1446	November 13, 2023	Awkwafina, Micaela Diamond	Teddy Swims
A Closer Look
1447	November 14, 2023	Ed Helms, Eve Hewson, Ari Melber	N/A
Late Night with Seth Meyers Republican Presidential Debate
1448	November 15, 2023	Ariana DeBose, Iman Vellani	N/A
A Closer Look
1449	November 16, 2023	Chris Tucker, Paul Dano	N/A
A Closer Look
1450	November 20, 2023	Wanda Sykes, Taran Killam	N/A
A Closer Look
1451	November 21, 2023	Gayle King, Brian Cox, Da'Vine Joy Randolph	N/A
Jokes Seth Can't Tell (the segment's 50th edition)
1452	November 22, 2023	Paul Giamatti, Andrew Moskos & Pep Rosenfeld	N/A
At This Point in the Broadcast: Seth's opinions on turning 50
1453	November 23, 2023	The Meyers Family	N/A
A Closer Look, Ya Brined

=== December ===
No.	Original release date	Guest(s)	Musical/entertainment guest(s)
1454	December 4, 2023	Michael Shannon & Jason Narducy, Rachel Bloom	Michael Shannon & Jason Narducy
A Closer Look
1455	December 5, 2023	Elizabeth Banks, Jesse David Fox	Stephen Sanchez
Surprise Inspection!
1456	December 6, 2023	Maluma, Tony Shalhoub	N/A
A Closer Look
1457	December 7, 2023	Colin Jost, Gael García Bernal	N/A
A Closer Look
1458	December 11, 2023	Dua Lipa, George Stephanopoulos	N/A
A Closer Look, Seth and Dua Lipa Go Day Drinking
1459	December 12, 2023	Kate McKinnon, Carmelo Anthony & The Kid Mero	Leo Reich
Amber Says What
1460	December 13, 2023	Gov. Gavin Newsom, Danielle Brooks	Alexander Stewart
A Closer Look
1461	December 14, 2023	Tracee Ellis Ross, Mike Birbiglia	N/A
A Closer Look
1462	December 18, 2023	Jeremy Allen White, Hannah Waddingham	N/A
A Closer Look
1463	December 19, 2023	Sarah Silverman, Greta Lee, Rick Martínez	N/A
Ya Burnt
1464	December 20, 2023	Adam Driver, Gary Gulman	N/A
A Closer Look
1465	December 21, 2023	Amy Poehler, Jack Antonoff	Bleachers
A Closer Look
