= List of Late Night with Seth Meyers episodes (2024) =

Season of television series

- No. of episodes: 139 (and 2 specials)

Release
- Original network: NBC
- Original release: January 8 – December 19, 2024

Season chronology
- ← Previous; 2023 episodes Next → 2025 episodes

This is the list of episodes for Late Night with Seth Meyers in 2024.

== 2024 ==
=== January ===
| No. | Original release date | Guest(s) | Musical/entertainment guest(s) |
|---|---|---|---|
| 1466 | January 8, 2024 | James McAvoy, Rachel Dratch | N/A |
A Closer Look
| 1467 | January 9, 2024 | Dua Lipa, Phil Lord and Christopher Miller | N/A |
Surprise Inspection!, Dua Lipa and Seth get tattoos
| 1468 | January 10, 2024 | Kurt Russell & Wyatt Russell, David Chase | N/A |
A Closer Look
| 1469 | January 11, 2024 | Tina Fey, Andrew Scott | N/A |
A Closer Look
| 1470 | January 17, 2024 | Reneé Rapp, Ian McShane | Black Pumas |
A Closer Look
| 1471 | January 18, 2024 | Clive Owen, Isla Fisher, Robert Smigel | N/A |
A Closer Look
| 1472 | January 22, 2024 | Common, Tom Hollander | N/A |
A Closer Look
| 1473 | January 23, 2024 | Sarah Paulson, Punkie Johnson, Brad Meltzer | N/A |
Late Night with Seth Meyers Republican Presidential Debate
| 1474 | January 24, 2024 | Alex Wagner, J. Smith-Cameron | Baby Tate |
A Closer Look
| 1475 | January 25, 2024 | Kenan Thompson, Ronny Chieng | N/A |
A Closer Look, Kenan Thompson plays Pernice Lafonk
| 1476 | January 29, 2024 | Sterling K. Brown, Melissa Rauch | N/A |
A Closer Look
| 1477 | January 30, 2024 | James Corden, Devery Jacobs | Nico Carney |
In Other News
| 1478 | January 31, 2024 | Bryan Cranston, Lola Tung | N/A |
A Closer Look

=== February ===
| No. | Original release date | Guest(s) | Musical/entertainment guest(s) |
|---|---|---|---|
| 1479 | February 1, 2024 | Larry David, Katy Tur | N/A |
A Closer Look
| 1480 | February 5, 2024 | Senator Bernie Sanders, Zosia Mamet | N/A |
A Closer Look
| 1481 | February 6, 2024 | Molly Ringwald, Kay Adams, Nana Kwame Adjei-Brenyah | N/A |
Jokes Seth Can't Tell
| 1482 | February 7, 2024 | Dakota Johnson, Sheryl Lee Ralph | N/A |
A Closer Look
| 1483 | February 8, 2024 | Jeffrey Wright, Jon Cryer | N/A |
A Closer Look
| 1484 | February 12, 2024 | Beanie Feldstein, Ben Mendelsohn | N/A |
A Closer Look
| 1485 | February 13, 2024 | Chris Hayes, Geraldine Viswanathan | Matt Goldich |
Back in My Day
| 1486 | February 14, 2024 | Jake Tapper, Chelsea Peretti | Stephen Wilson Jr. |
A Closer Look
| 1487 | February 15, 2024 | America Ferrera | N/A |
A Closer Look, Seth Manifests a Better World
| 1488 | February 26, 2024 | Amy Poehler, President Joe Biden | N/A |
A Closer Look, Seth celebrates the 10th anniversary of the premiere of Late Night with Seth Meyers
| 1489 | February 27, 2024 | Chance the Rapper, Margaret Qualley, Emilio Vitolo | N/A |
Amber Says What
| 1490 | February 28, 2024 | Austin Butler, Jenny Slate | Two Door Cinema Club |
A Closer Lick
| 1491 | February 29, 2024 | Jamie Dornan | N/A |
Andy Samberg portrays Steve Winwood, A Closer Look

=== March ===
| No. | Original release date | Guest(s) | Musical/entertainment guest(s) |
|---|---|---|---|
| 1492 | March 4, 2024 | Josh Brolin, David Sedaris | Paloma Faith |
A Closer Look, Josh Brolin brings Seth a T-shirt
| 1493 | March 5, 2024 | Joel McHale, Kyle Kinane | N/A |
The Kind of Story We Need Right Now, John Lutz: Product Tester
| 1494 | March 6, 2024 | Annette Bening, Julio Torres | N/A |
A Closer Look
| 1495 | March 7, 2024 | Peter Dinklage, Rory Scovel | N/A |
A Closer Look
| 1496 | March 11, 2024 | Bowen Yang, Kara Swisher | N/A |
A Closer Look
| 1497 | March 12, 2024 | Ewan McGregor, Sara Bareilles, James Acaster | N/A |
Ya Burnt
| 1498 | March 13, 2024 | Kristen Stewart, Walton Goggins | N/A |
A Closer Look
| 1499 | March 14, 2024 | Paul Rudd, Paula Pell | N/A |
A Closer Look
| 1500 | March 25, 2024 | Jake Gyllenhaal, Andrea Riseborough | N/A |
A Closer Look
| 1501 | March 26, 2024 | Cecily Strong, Nicholas Galitzine, Greg Davies & Alex Horne | N/A |
Seth & Kristen Go Day Drinking
| 1502 | March 27, 2024 | Maya Rudolph, Beth Ditto | Gossip |
A Closer Look
| 1503 | March 28, 2024 | Liam Neeson, Sheryl Crow | Sheryl Crow |
A Closer Look

=== April ===
| No. | Original release date | Guest(s) | Musical/entertainment guest(s) |
|---|---|---|---|
| 1504 | April 1, 2024 | Jeremy Strong, Amber Ruffin | N/A |
A Closer Look
| 1505 | April 2, 2024 | Tim Robinson, Wendell Pierce, Lindsay Mendez | N/A |
Surprise Inspection!
| 1506 | April 3, 2024 | Jerrod Carmichael, Stephanie Ruhle | X Ambassadors |
A Closer Look
| 1507 | April 4, 2024 | Kristen Wiig, Mike Birbiglia | N/A |
A Closer Look
| 1508 | April 8, 2024 | The Lonely Island, Jessica Lange, Corey Stoll | N/A |
A Closer Look
| 1509 | April 9, 2024 | Daniel Radcliffe, Neal Brennan, Chef George Motz | N/A |
Jeff Wright talks about the 2024 United States presidential election
| 1510 | April 10, 2024 | Kirsten Dunst, Sean Casey & Ryan Dempster | N/A |
A Closer Look
| 1511 | April 11, 2024 | Liev Schreiber, Busy Philipps | N/A |
A Closer Look
| 1512 | April 29, 2024 | Jim Gaffigan, Charli XCX & Troye Sivan | N/A |
A Closer Look, Jim Gaffigan and Seth have drinks
| 1513 | April 30, 2024 | Joe Manganiello, Jonathan Lemire, Zarna Garg | N/A |
At This Point in the Broadcast: Seth's opinions about vests

=== May ===
| No. | Original release date | Guest(s) | Musical/entertainment guest(s) |
|---|---|---|---|
| 1514 | May 1, 2024 | Orlando Bloom, Ncuti Gatwa | N/A |
A Closer Look, Seth Has One More Thing to Say About This
| 1515 | May 2, 2024 | Jonathan Groff, Adam Pally | N/A |
A Closer Look
| 1516 | May 6, 2024 | John Oliver, Mikey Day | N/A |
A Closer Look
| 1517 | May 7, 2024 | Joel Edgerton, Lily Gladstone, Cole Escola | N/A |
Amber Says What
| 1518 | May 8, 2024 | Jennifer Connelly, Indigo Girls | Indigo Girls |
A Closer Look
| 1519 | May 9, 2024 | Tiffany Haddish, Cam Heyward | N/A |
A Closer Look
| 1520 | May 13, 2024 | Jimmy Kimmel, Nicola Coughlan | N/A |
A Closer Look
| 1521 | May 14, 2024 | Ed O'Neill, Nikki Glaser, Amor Towles | N/A |
Jokes Seth Can't Tell
| 1522 | May 15, 2024 | Quinta Brunson, Bobby Moynihan | Les Savy Fav |
A Closer Look
| 1523 | May 16, 2024 | Will Forte, Ben Platt | N/A |
A Closer Look, Rachel Dratch makes a surprise appearance

=== June ===
| No. | Original release date | Guest(s) | Musical/entertainment guest(s) |
|---|---|---|---|
| 1524 | June 3, 2024 | Sandra Oh, Retta | Ben Platt |
A Closer Look (What's the Play Here...)
| 1525 | June 4, 2024 | Kevin Bacon, Chris Colfer | Sydnee Washington |
Back in My Day
| 1526 | June 5, 2024 | Amy Poehler, Stephen Merchant | N/A |
A Closer Look
| 1527 | June 6, 2024 | David Ortiz, John Early | N/A |
A Closer Look
| 1528 | June 10, 2024 | Julia Louis-Dreyfus, Theo James | N/A |
A Closer Look
| 1529 | June 11, 2024 | Eddie Redmayne, Dan Licata | N/A |
Seth & Julia Go Day Drinking
| 1530 | June 12, 2024 | Will Ferrell | N/A |
A Closer Look, Second Chance Theatre (appearances by John Oliver, Bowen Yang & Rachel Dratch)
| 1531 | June 13, 2024 | Jon Hamm, Bowen Yang & Matt Rogers | N/A |
A Closer Look
| 1532 | June 17, 2024 | Ayo Edebiri, Luke Wilson | Michael Marcagi |
A Closer Look
| 1533 | June 18, 2024 | Eddie Murphy, Nicola Yoon | N/A |
Surprise Inspection!
| 1534 | June 19, 2024 | Lupita Nyong'o, Ebon Moss-Bachrach | N/A |
A Closer Look
| 1535 | June 20, 2024 | Jesse Plemons, Diane von Fürstenberg & Sharmeen Obaid-Chinoy | N/A |
A Closer Look

=== July ===
| No. | Original release date | Guest(s) | Musical/entertainment guest(s) |
|---|---|---|---|
| 1536 | July 8, 2024 | Tyler Perry, Alex Cooper | N/A |
A Closer Look
| 1537 | July 9, 2024 | Rashida Jones, Antony Starr, Julia Phillips | N/A |
Couple Things with Jeff Wright
| 1538 | July 10, 2024 | Whoopi Goldberg, Abby Elliott | N/A |
A Closer Look
| 1539 | July 11, 2024 | Kenan Thompson, Jen Psaki | N/A |
A Closer Look, Pernice Lafonk (Kenan Thompson) reads an excerpt from his latest book
| 1540 | July 15, 2024 | Anna Faris, Colman Domingo | N/A |
Seth discusses the attempted assassination of Donald Trump, A Closer Look
| 1541 | July 16, 2024 | Natalie Portman, Noah Kahan, Maika Monroe | N/A |
Ya Burnt
| 1542 | July 17, 2024 | Michael Cera, Daisy Edgar-Jones | James Bay |
A Closer Look
| 1543 | July 18, 2024 | Glen Powell, Anna Sawai | N/A |
A Closer Look

=== August ===
| No. | Original release date | Guest(s) | Musical/entertainment guest(s) |
|---|---|---|---|
| 1544 | August 12, 2024 | John Mulaney, Ilona Maher | N/A |
A Closer Look, Seth Has a Bone to Pick with Democrats
| 1545 | August 13, 2024 | Mia Farrow & Patti LuPone, Myha'la, Simon Rich | N/A |
Amber Says What
| 1546 | August 14, 2024 | Casey Affleck, Meredith Hagner | N/A |
A Closer Look
| 1547 | August 15, 2024 | Jean Smart, Jonathan Bailey | N/A |
A Closer Look
| 1548 | August 19, 2024 | Jessica Alba, Ramin Setoodeh, Langston Kerman | N/A |
A Closer Look
| 1549 | August 20, 2024 | Michael Keaton, Conner O'Malley | N/A |
Surprise Inspection!
| 1550 | August 21, 2024 | Channing Tatum, Sabrina Ionescu | N/A |
A Closer Look
| 1551 | August 22, 2024 | Amy Poehler, Fred Armisen | Fred Armisen and the 8G Band ft. Bob Mould |
A Closer Look, last on-air appearance by The 8G Band

=== September ===
| No. | Original release date | Guest(s) | Musical/entertainment guest(s) |
|---|---|---|---|
| 1552 | September 3, 2024 | Chris Hayes, Edie Falco | N/A |
A Closer Look
| 1553 | September 4, 2024 | Dax Shepard, Carrie Coon | N/A |
A Closer Look
| 1554 | September 5, 2024 | Don Cheadle, Ana Gasteyer | N/A |
A Closer Look
| 1555 | September 9, 2024 | Kacey Musgraves, Sue Bird & Megan Rapinoe | N/A |
A Closer Look
| 1556 | September 10, 2024 | Kevin Hart, James McAvoy | N/A |
Seth & Kevin Go Day Drinking
| Special | September 11, 2024 | N/A | N/A |
A Closer Look with Seth Meyers: Primetime Live Election Special
| 1557 | September 11, 2024 | Demi Moore, Jonathan Pryce | N/A |
Jokes Seth Can't Tell, Jeff Wright responds to recent politics
| 1558 | September 12, 2024 | Kathryn Hahn, Kevin Smith | N/A |
A Closer Look
| 1559 | September 17, 2024 | Brian Tyree Henry, Ms. Pat | N/A |
A Closer Look
| 1560 | September 18, 2024 | Colin Farrell, Ashley Park | N/A |
A Closer Look
| 1561 | September 19, 2024 | Jalen Brunson & Josh Hart | N/A |
A Closer Look
| 1562 | September 23, 2024 | Michael Bublé, Leanne Morgan | N/A |
Why That Lie?, A Closer Look
| 1563 | September 24, 2024 | Will Ferrell & Harper Steele, Kristen Bell | N/A |
Late Night with Seth Meyers Presidential Debate
| 1564 | September 25, 2024 | Andy Samberg, Shailene Woodley | N/A |
A Closer Look
| 1565 | September 26, 2024 | Aubrey Plaza, Chloe Fineman | N/A |
A Closer Look
| 1566 | September 30, 2024 | Alicia Keys, Alex Moffat | N/A |
A Closer Look

=== October ===
| No. | Original release date | Guest(s) | Musical/entertainment guest(s) |
|---|---|---|---|
| 1567 | October 1, 2024 | Kate McKinnon, Zachary Quinto | N/A |
Back in My Day
| 1568 | October 2, 2024 | Mariska Hargitay, Method Man | N/A |
A Closer Look
| 1569 | October 3, 2024 | Nate Bargatze, Paul Reiser | N/A |
A Closer Look
| 1570 | October 7, 2024 | Andrew Garfield, Cristin Milioti | N/A |
A Closer Look
| 1571 | October 8, 2024 | Nathan Lane, Rosemarie DeWitt, Amelia Dimoldenberg | N/A |
Amber Says What
| 1572 | October 9, 2024 | Riley Keough, Eric Idle | N/A |
A Closer Look
| 1573 | October 10, 2024 | Jake Tapper, Alice Paul Tapper | N/A |
Late Night with Seth Meyers Vice Presidential Debate, Ben Warheit Gets Punished for His Moderate Democrat Thoughts
| 1574 | October 21, 2024 | Steve Martin & Martin Short, Juno Temple | N/A |
A Closer Look
| 1575 | October 22, 2024 | Liam Neeson, Jenny Slate, Tim O'Brien | N/A |
Jokes Seth Can't Tell
| 1576 | October 23, 2024 | Lin-Manuel Miranda, Bernadette Peters | N/A |
A Closer Look
| 1577 | October 24, 2024 | Tom Holland, David Remnick | N/A |
A Closer Look
| 1578 | October 28, 2024 | Molly Shannon, Brooks Wheelan | N/A |
A Closer Look
| 1579 | October 29, 2024 | Nicolle Wallace, Betty Gilpin, Jeff Hiller | N/A |
Surprise Inspection!
| 1580 | October 30, 2024 | Tom Hanks, Ina Garten | N/A |
A Closer Look
| 1581 | October 31, 2024 | Jesse Eisenberg, Mika Brzezinski | N/A |
A Closer Look

=== November ===
| No. | Original release date | Guest(s) | Musical/entertainment guest(s) |
|---|---|---|---|
| 1582 | November 4, 2024 | Keri Russell, J. B. Smoove | N/A |
A Closer Look
| 1583 | November 6, 2024 | Joel McHale, Ali Larter | N/A |
A Closer Look
| 1584 | November 7, 2024 | Barry Keoghan, Scott Speedman | N/A |
A Closer Look
| 1585 | November 11, 2024 | Jim Parsons, Wendi McLendon-Covey | N/A |
A Closer Look
| 1586 | November 12, 2024 | Gayle King, Rebecca Ferguson | N/A |
Amber Says What, A Bit of a Delay with John Lutz
| 1587 | November 13, 2024 | Hugh Grant, Jonathan Bailey | N/A |
A Closer Look
| 1588 | November 14, 2024 | Cynthia Erivo, Brett Goldstein | N/A |
A Closer Look
| 1589 | November 18, 2024 | Kristin Chenoweth, Jimmy O. Yang | N/A |
A Closer Look
| 1590 | November 19, 2024 | Ted Danson, Xolo Maridueña | Sam Morril |
Ya Burnt
| 1591 | November 20, 2024 | Brian Williams, Bridget Everett | N/A |
A Closer Look
| 1592 | November 21, 2024 | Rita Moreno, Rachel Zegler | N/A |
A Closer Look
| 1593 | November 25, 2024 | Jim Gaffigan, Allison Tolman | N/A |
A Closer Look
| 1594 | November 26, 2024 | Kaley Cuoco, Ryan Clark, Percival Everett | N/A |
Late Night Giving of Thanks, Seth and Lutz Are Peppermint Pals
| 1595 | November 27, 2024 | Jennifer Hudson, James Acaster, Chef Michael Narciso | N/A |
Back in My Day
| 1596 | November 28, 2024 | The Meyers Family | N/A |
A Closer Look

=== December ===
| No. | Original release date | Guest(s) | Musical/entertainment guest(s) |
|---|---|---|---|
| 1597 | December 9, 2024 | Taron Egerton, Paris Hilton & Nicole Richie | N/A |
A Closer Look
| 1598 | December 10, 2024 | Colin Jost, Sharon Horgan, Patrick Radden Keefe | N/A |
Surprise Inspection!
| 1599 | December 11, 2024 | Eddie Redmayne, Kyle Mooney | N/A |
A Closer Look, Seth Forgives Himself
| 1600 | December 12, 2024 | Billy Crystal, Sarah Michelle Gellar | N/A |
A Closer Look
| 1601 | December 16, 2024 | Kerry Washington, Darren Criss & Helen J Shen | N/A |
A Closer Look
| 1602 | December 17, 2024 | Billy Eichner, Harris Dickinson, Chef Mario Carbone | N/A |
Jokes Seth Can't Tell
| 1603 | December 18, 2024 | Hoda Kotb, Amy Sedaris | N/A |
A Closer Look
| 1604 | December 19, 2024 | John Mulaney & Simon Rich, Nicholas Hoult | N/A |
A Closer Look
| Special | December 31, 2024 | N/A | N/A |
The Day Drinking with Seth Meyers New Year's Eve Special
