= The Awesomes =

2010s American animated TV series

- From left to right: Concierge, Muscleman, Frantic, Hotwire, Sumo, Perfect Man, Gadget Gal, Impresario, Prock
- Genre: Superhero; Comedy
- Created by: Seth Meyers; Mike Shoemaker
- Starring: Seth Meyers; Ike Barinholtz; Emily Spivey; Taran Killam; Kenan Thompson; Bobby Lee; Paula Pell; Rashida Jones; Bill Hader; Josh Meyers; Rachel Dratch
- Composer: Michael Tavera
- Country of origin: United States
- Original language: English
- No. of seasons: 3
- No. of episodes: 30

Production
- Executive producers: Seth Meyers; Mike Shoemaker; Lorne Michaels; Andrew Singer; Mark McJimsey
- Producer: Judd Winick
- Running time: 22 minutes
- Production companies: Broadway Video; Sethmaker Shoemeyers Productions; Bento Box Entertainment; Georgia; Hulu Originals

Original release
- Network: Hulu
- Release: August 1, 2013 – November 3, 2015

The Awesomes is an American adult animated sitcom web series created by Seth Meyers and Mike Shoemaker for Hulu. Meyers and Shoemaker serve as executive producers alongside Lorne Michaels. It debuted on August 1, 2013 and ended on November 3, 2015.

== Premise ==
The show follows a group of superheroes who step in and replace the members of a legendary but disbanding superhero team. Under new leadership, The Awesomes attempt to put themselves back together in the face of intense media and government skepticism.

== Characters ==
=== The Awesomes ===
- Professor Dr. Jeremy "Prock" Awesome (voiced by Seth Meyers) is the son of Mr. Awesome and the young new leader of the Awesomes. Power: Stops time for short bursts. This helps him get the upper hand in battle.
- Harry "Muscleman" Strong (voiced by Ike Barinholtz) is Prock's best friend from childhood since their fathers were teammates in the original Awesomes. Power: name implies.
- Connie "Concierge" (voiced by Emily Spivey) is the secretary of the new Awesomes. Power: the Awesomes administrator.
- Zip "Frantic" Danger (voiced by Taran Killam) has the power of superhuman speed.
- Arlene "Gadget Gal" (voiced by Paula Pell) is the only active original member of The Awesomes.
- Austin "Impresario" Sullivan (voiced by Kenan Thompson) is mama's boy whose power is conjuring things with his mind.
- Tim "Sumo" (voiced by Bobby Lee) is an eleven year old Asian-American boy.
- Katherine "Hotwire" Malocchio (voiced by Rashida Jones) has the power of manipulating electricity. She is Prock's girlfriend.
- Perfect Man Awesome (voiced by Josh Meyers) is an arrogant, publicity-seeking but lovable former member of the original Awesomes, who has gone solo.

=== Supervillains ===
- Dr. Giuseppe Malocchio (voiced by Bill Hader) is the founder of Malocchio Laboratories.
- Whiskey 'Richard' Dick first appeared in the episode "Euro-Awesomes" to steal high tech parts from 3 different labs (one in America and two in Europe) but was killed shortly after revealing that he had been hired to do so (it turned out to be Prock's old mentor Dr. Turfenpeltz).
- Dr. Turfenpeltz (voiced by Bobby Moynihan) was formerly the chief scientist for the Awesomes and was Prock's mentor and helped Prock to believe in himself and his intellect.
- Tomboy (voiced by Rachel Dratch) is a female arch-enemy of Gadget Gal, having battled her for decades while also using gadgets.
- Seaman (voiced by Andy Samberg) is an ocean themed superhero turned supervillain who resides in the ocean.
- Villain-Tine (voiced by Jack McBrayer) is a supervillain who usually invades every Valentine's Day to steal the world's roses in order to sell them for high prices.
- The Gay Mafia is the world's first openly gay supervillain mafia team.

=== The Astoundings ===
- Professor Astounding (voiced by Seth Meyers) is Prock's evil counterpart and leader of the Astoundings.
- The Beast is Muscle Man's evil counterpart, but is a giant evil bulldog.
- Infobitch (voiced by Emily Spivey) is Concierge's evil counterpart.
- Kid Meth (voiced by Taran Killam) is Frantic's evil counterpart, who has super-speed as well, but also has green pyrokinetic powers.
- Mercenary Moll (voiced by Paula Pell) is Gadget Gal's evil counterpart.
- The Conjurer (voiced by Kenan Thompson) is Impresario's evil counterpart.
- Bad Dragon (voiced by Bobby Lee) is Sumo's evil counterpart.
- Other Hotwire (voiced by Rashida Jones) is Hotwire's supposedly evil counterpart.

=== The P.R.I.C.K.S. (Primates Really Into Crime and Killing Sprees) ===
- Giuseppe Malocchio Jr. (voiced by Will Forte) is the son of renowned supervillain Dr. Malocchio, Jr.
- Elliot "Jeff Apelstein" Levy-Apelstein (voiced by Colin Quinn) is a talking ape-man from Apesylvania and an acquaintance of Malocchio Jr.
- Pablo (voiced by Bobby Moynihan) is a bully from Tim/Sumo's school who became a member of the P.R.I.C.K.S.
- Lola "The Agravator" Gold (voiced by Kate McKinnon) is a supervillain with the power to turn people against each other.
- Impresario Clone (also voiced by Kenan Thompson) is an exact construct copy of Impresario except for a small lump of Impresario's mom.

=== The Replacement Awesomes ===
- Frank "Mr. Awesome" Awesome (voiced by Steve Higgins) is the founder of the original Awesomes and its leader for the past 60 years, and Prock and Perfect Man's father.
- Pharaoh (voiced by David Herman) is an Egyptian themed hero that wears a mask similar to King Tut. Perfect Man incorrectly calls him the Mummy. He wields a staff that can create snakes out of energy.
- Hotwings (voiced by Bobby Moynihan) is a rooster themed hero with buck teeth and a Southern Accent.
- Silent But Deadly (voiced by Leslie Jones) is a mute ninja hero in all black with teleportation powers.
- Rocket Boobs (voiced by Michelle Wolf) is an African-American woman who looks very similar to RoboCop (metallic body) and Anton Zeck (tech bodysuit with mohawk and visor).
- Centaur (voiced by Fred Armisen) is a centaur who makes horse puns.
- Codebraker (voiced by Charlie Adler) is the team's computer expert and hacker.

=== Dames of Danger ===
- Joyce "Fireplug" Mandrake (voiced by Rachel Dratch) is from the G.O.O.S.A. (Government Office of Superhero Affairs) and she handles the funding for the Awesomes.
- Glinda "Lady Malocchio" Malocchio (voiced by Maya Rudolph) is the supportive, carefree, slightly absent minded wife of Dr. Malocchio and mother of Malocchio Jr. and Hotwire.
- Jaclyn Stone (voiced by Amy Poehler) was originally Prock's girlfriend whom he started dating in "The People vs Perfect Man".
- Abby "Musclegirl" Strong-Apelstein (voiced by Jill Benjamin) is Muscleman's sister who was first introduced in the season 2 episode "Destination Deading", where she married an ape.

=== Others with superpowers ===
- Dine and Dash (voiced by Cecily Strong and Mike O'Gorman) are Sumo's parents, two former mercenaries who formed their own criminal duo after meeting in combat and falling in love.
- Kid Crab (voiced by Andy Samberg) is one of the heroes who auditioned for the Awesomes.
- The Advocate (voiced by Tina Fey) is one of the heroes who auditioned for the Awesomes.
- Toolbox (voiced by Bobby Moynihan) is one of the heroes who auditioned for the Awesomes.
- The Snotzi is one of the heroes who auditioned for the Awesomes.
- Teleportation Larry (voiced by Bobby Moynihan) is one of the heroes when joins The Awesomes in his place after Muscleman quits the team.
- Black Irish (voiced by Taran Killam) is a former member of The Awesomes in the glory days of the team and he is masked crime fighter and the world's greatest detective.
- California Man is a former superhero who was responsible for the deaths of 600 people when he flew to San Francisco instead of Sacramento.
- Cait Walker (voiced by Noël Wells) is Tim's classmate at Spiro Agnew Middle School.
- Made Man (voiced by Bobby Moynihan) is a former superhero from the 70s who can perform gang-like punishments.

=== Euro-Awesomes ===
- Knight Light (voiced by Noël Wells) represents England.
- Flying Dutchman (voiced by Josh Meyers) represents the Netherlands.
- Crotch Puncher represents Spain.
- Hooligan represents Ireland.
- Mademoiselle Hunchback (voiced by Kate McKinnon) represents France.
- Invisi-Pope represents both Italy and the Catholic church.
- Czechmate (voiced by Ike Barinholtz) represents the Czech Republic.

=== Non-Powered Humans ===
- Annabelle Sullivan (also voiced by Kenan Thompson) is Impresario's mother.
- Dr. Jill Stein-Awesome-Kaplan (voiced by Vanessa Bayer) is Prock's mother, the former wife of Mr. Awesome and the current wife of Jeffry Kaplan.
- Dr. Jeffry Kaplan (voiced by Fred Armisen) is Jill's current husband and Prock's stepfather who is an accredited therapist.
- Steven (voiced by Dan Mintz) is Frantic's ex-boyfriend.

== Episodes ==
=== Series overview ===
Season	Episodes	Originally released	
Season	Episodes	First released	Last released
1	10	August 1, 2013	September 26, 2013
2	10	August 4, 2014	September 29, 2014
3	10	September 8, 2015	November 3, 2015

=== Season 1 (2013) ===
No. overall	No. in season	Title	Written by	Original release date
1–2	1–2	"Pilot"	Seth Meyers & Mike Shoemaker	August 1, 2013
Part 1: Mr. Awesome retires, and the rest of the Awesomes quit when his son Prock tries to assume leadership. The government decides to stop all funding unless Prock can recruit a new team with the help of his childhood friend Muscleman and one paid staff member, Concierge. Part 2: Dr. Malocchio hypnotized the entire world to believe that he's good; Prock tries to prove them wrong. Also, a mysterious girl "Hotwire" shows up wanting to join the Awesomes. Absent: Hotwire (Part 1)
3	3	"Baby Got Backstory"	Judd Winick	August 8, 2013
The team gets trapped in the training room for mysterious reasons, so they decided to tell each other the back stories of how they got their powers. All except for Gadget Gal, who's being attacked in the hallway by her archenemy Tomboy.
4	4	"No Mo' Sumo"	Judd Winick	August 15, 2013
Tim's parents want him to come home, but we soon realize that his parents aren't being completely honest about who they really are. The Awesomes decide to help them get into a secretive hero protection program, causing a chain reaction of deals. At the end of the episode, Prock is warned by a clarivoyant that someone will betray the team.
5	5	"It's a Mad Mad Mad Parallel World"	Judd Winick	August 22, 2013
The team gets sent to an opposite world, Earth 4, where The Awesomes are evil and known as The Astoundings. Prock has to outwit his evil alter ego (Professor Astounding) by working with the good version of Dr. Malocchio so they can get back to their world. Meanwhile the evil Dr. Malocchio is causing trouble in the real world by hypnotizing Joyce and Perfect Man.
6	6	"Robotherapy"	Josh Weinstein	August 29, 2013
Joyce (hypnotized by Dr. Malocchio) threatens to break up the team unless they submit to robotherapy, a worldwide trend. Most team members are enthusiastic although it seems to reduce their effectiveness as superheroes. However, Prock and Gadget Gal refuse because they distrust both robots and therapy, so they're kicked out of headquarters, along with Hotwire, who was suspected of covering something up during therapy. Later, the robots use the therapy session information to blackmail humanity.
7	7	"Paternity"	Seth Meyers	September 5, 2013
Muscleman faces an intergalactic paternity suit, and Impresario and Frantic must defend him on an alien talk show. However, Muscleman lets it slip that Frantic and Impresario may help him escape, causing both to be tied up. Meanwhile, Prock learns the meaning of delegation when Tim and Gadget Gal go on their first solo mission.
8	8	"Pageant"	Josh Weinstein	September 12, 2013
Frantic is chosen to judge a third-tier beauty pageant, but Gadget Gal suspects it might be a trap. Having been voted the least fun member of the team, Prock tries to loosen up. Meanwhile, Hotwire tries to track down a special device.
9	9	"The Super-Hero Awards, Part 1"	Seth Meyers & Mike Shoemaker	September 19, 2013
The first annual Superhero Awards take place at the White House. Confirming Prock's suspicions, Dr. Malocchio reveals two secret weapons - one of whom is a member of The Awesomes.
10	10	"The Super-Hero Awards, Part 2"	Seth Meyers & Mike Shoemaker	September 26, 2013
All the world's superheroes are rendered powerless, except The Awesomes. Prock must reconcile with Hotwire in order to stop Dr. Malocchio and shut off the laser. However, Malocchio sets off a timed bomb. As Frantic evacuates the team out, Prock is told by Hotwire to leave the building without her, which results in the explosion of the building and Prock assuming her to be dead.

=== Season 2 (2014) ===
No. overall	No. in season	Title	Directed by	Written by	Original release date
11	1	"Hotwire's Funeral"	Sean Coyle	Dan Mintz	August 4, 2014
Malocchio's will left his son the last vial of the serum that made him evil and superpowered. Meanwhile, the mysterious superhero vigilante Metal Fella appears on the scene and Prock is desperate to catch him.
12	2	"People vs. Perfect Man"	Sean Coyle	Ben Warheit	August 4, 2014
Perfect Man stands accused of treason and goes to trial for his violent actions under Malocchio's influence. Prock attempts to defend him and he unexpectedly falls in love with the opposing attorney Jaclyn Stone.
13	3	"Destination Deading"	Sean Coyle	Dan Levy	August 11, 2014
The team battles hotel surcharges, tiresome conversations, and a poorly planned reception during a trip to Catalina Island for Muscleman's sister's wedding. Meanwhile, Malocchio Jr. hires an ape named Elliot to attack the Awesomes at the wedding, whilst being a guest there. Absent: Hotwire/Metal Fella
14	4	"Tim Goes to School"	Sean Coyle	Alex Baze	August 18, 2014
The Awesomes follow Tim back to school when the government mandates that all superheroes under the age of 18 receive a high school diploma. Tim struggles with bullies until he reveals his super powers. Prock has trouble keeping texts from women who are attracted to him a secret from Jaclyn. Malocchio Jr. proceeds to form an evil team, injecting Elliot (who now wants to be called Jeff) and main antagonist of the episode Pablo with the evil serum.
15	5	"The Awesomes' Awesome Show"	Sean Coyle	Judd Winick	August 25, 2014
TV producer Lola Gold entices The Awesomes to boost their profile by starring in a reality show, resulting in Frantic revealing a big secret in an attempt to be more famous. Absent: Hotwire/Metal Fella
16	6	"Made Man"	Sean Coyle	Ben Warheit	September 1, 2014
Impresario faces his toughest challenge when his mom starts dating Mademan, an older superhero. Gadget Gal plays a high-stakes poker game with her former teammates, throwing Tim into her games in the process. Absent: Hotwire/Metal Fella
17	7	"Secret Santa"	Sean Coyle	Dan Levy	September 8, 2014
Just as Prock prepares to leave to visit and meet Jaclyn's parents, a new enemy with the appearance of Santa Claus manipulates children to commit crimes all over the globe. While trying to change the day of his flight, Prock disguises as a child to get the attention of "Animal Control."
18	8	"Euro-Awesomes"	Sean Coyle	Judd Winick	September 15, 2014
The theft of a deadly weapon takes the team across the Atlantic to Europe, where they meet the Euro-Awesomes. When Metal Fella/Hotwire follows the Awesomes to Europe, she short circuits the suit unintentionally and reveals her identity. Meanwhile back in America, Malocchio Jr. recruits Jaclyn to be a member of the PRICKS.
19	9	"Day of Awesomes, Part 1"	Sean Coyle	Dan Mintz	September 22, 2014
The Awesomes are celebrated with a revival of "The Day of Awesomes," but the PRICKS crash the parade to distract the Awesomes while Malocchio Junior heads back to Awesome Mountain to open a portal to another planet to get a device to destroy the entire planet.
20	10	"Day of Awesomes, Part 2"	Sean Coyle	Judd Winick	September 29, 2014
Prock and the team chase after the PRICKS throughout the planet, facing imitating birds and strange flora in the process. Meanwhile, Mr. Awesome tries a blood transfusion with Malocchio which turns him evil unintentionally.

=== Season 3 (2015) ===
On August 19, 2014, Hulu renewed The Awesomes for a third season, which premiered on September 8, 2015 on Hulu.

No. overall	No. in season	Title	Directed by	Written by	Original release date
21	1	"Seaman's Revenge"	Sean Coyle & Jason Shwartz	Alison Bennett≠	September 8, 2015
When undersea creatures stage a series of attacks on land, the Awesomes visit an old friend, Seaman (Andy Samberg) at the bottom of the ocean; Mr. Awesome returns to Earth.
22	2	"Villain-Tine's Day"	Sean Coyle & Jason Shwartz	Dan Mintz & Dan Levy	September 8, 2015
Valentine's Day is ruined when Villain Tine steals all the roses in the world; Hotwire's Metal Fella suit goes rogue; Muscleman faces the wrath of a jilted lover; the public looks to Mr. Awesome to fix the mess.
23	3	"Les Miserawesomes"	Sean Coyle & Jason Shwartz	Josh Meyers	September 15, 2015
When Perfect Man and Impresario fix up France for Mademoiselle Hunchback to return home, the Awesomes are invited to a dinner party. However, a poison in the wine causes everyone, except for Concierge, Tim, and Prock, to sing incessantly. Meanwhile, Impresario starts a controversy with Perfect Man when he "steals" his bread.
24	4	"Awesomes for Hire"	Sean Coyle & Jason Shwartz	David Parker	September 22, 2015
Due to the events of the previous episode, Joyce Mandrake fires the Awesomes, with the exception of Perfect Man, so Mr. Awesome can replace them with new members. Stuck living with Prock's mother Jill and her new husband Jeffery, Prock suggests they become a team of heroes that are hired to help for normal situations. But when they have to help a little girl find her bike, they discover that being heroes for hire is not too different.
25	5	"Indiana Johnson and the Nazi Granddaughters"	Sean Coyle & Jason Shwartz	Ben Warheit	September 29, 2015
While adjusting to life as Awesomes for Hire, Prock receives a letter from an old companion of the Awesomes, Indiana Johnson, whose partner has gone missing while searching for a mysterious jewel that can bring the dead back to life. While on the journey to find him, Indiana discovers that his partner was killed by a trio of teenage girls who are granddaughters of Nazis, led by MacKenzie Hitler, the granddaughter of Adolf Hitler, who also want the jewel to revive their grandfathers.
26	6	"The Dames of Danger"	Sean Coyle & Jason Shwartz	Alison Bennett	October 6, 2015
Soon after Hotwire discovers she is pregnant with Prock's child, she, along with Gadget Gal and Concierge, attend a feminist award ceremony, where they discover that Muscleman's sister, Lady Malocchio, Jaclyn, and Joyce Mandrake all have associations with a secret female team, known as the Dames of Danger. Concierge, Gadget Gal, and an unwilling Hotwire attend their mission with them to go hunt down a villain known as Backstory. Meanwhile, the men of the Awesomes decide to hold their own "man awards," with Jeffrey.
27	7	"The Awesomes Reloaded"	Sean Coyle & Jason Shwartz	Story by : Judd Winick; Teleplay by : Josh Meyers	October 13, 2015
Mr. Awesome hires two villains to knock out the Awesomes and hook them into a simulator, in order to find their weaknesses. In this simulator, the Awesomes only know each other as friends and do not have their respective superpowers. Prock is a sheriff, Muscleman is a construction worker, Frantic becomes a track coach, Impresario becomes an art teacher, Gadget Gal is a doctor, Tim is a rebellious student, Concierge is a librarian and Hotwire is Prock's heavily pregnant wife. But when Perfect Man and the New Awesomes start playing the simulator like a dangerous video game, Perfect Man goes in as a landlord to get the Awesomes back to reality.
28	8	"The GayFather"	Sean Coyle & Jason Shwartz	Alex Baze	October 20, 2015
Frantic's boyfriend ends things between them, leaving him distraught, so, while Prock, Perfect Man and Muscleman head out on the road for a business trip, the others take him to a club, where he meets Christopher. Clearly in love, Frantic is oblivious to the fact that his new boyfriend is an active member of the Gay Mafia, a supervillain team consisting of gay men who plan to contaminate the water supply to force closeted gay men to come out. Meanwhile, as Prock, Muscleman and Perfect Man journey to pick up a file for Mr. Awesome, Perfect Man has flashbacks and begins to question his life.
29	9	"Super(hero) Tuesday"	Sean Coyle & Jason Shwartz	David Parker	October 27, 2015
Dr. Malocchio finally arrives to Earth, but none of the Awesomes are happy to see him. Hotwire however is grateful that her father is alive, and instantly believes him when Malocchio tells her of Mr. Awesome being evil. To get evidence that he is indeed evil to Prock, Hotwire sneaks into Awesome Mountain and discover the file Prock picked up in the previous episode. To avoid Perfect Man getting in the way, Mr. Awesome cryogenically freezes him, but Hotwire finds him while hiding from the Replacement Awesomes. Meanwhile back at the Kaplan residence, Dr. Malocchio tries to find a superhero with good cells the equivalent to Mr. Awesome's.
30	10	"The Final Showdown"	Sean Coyle & Jason Shwartz	Dan Mintz & Dan Levy	November 3, 2015
Desperate to get his hands on the Destroyo Bullet, a bullet consisting of radioactive material that can kill him, Mr. Awesome locks Joyce Mandrake in a safe to avoid her interference. As Impresario, Tim, Frantic and Gadget Gal face off against the Mr. Awesome, Prock frees Perfect Man. Annoyed, Mr. Awesome shoots Perfect Man with the Destroyo Bullet, but breaks down in guilt over killing his son. However, it turns out to be a fake death, allowing Prock to inject his father with the blood of Perfect Man. One year later, Hotwire has given birth to hers and Prock's daughter and everybody is residing in Italy due to Awesome Mountain being destroyed. Just as Mr. Awesome remembers the second reason he ran for president, a large UFO looms over the Awesomes, threatening their lives.

== International release ==
In Canada, The Awesomes aired on Teletoon's Teletoon at Night and Cartoon Network's Adult Swim late-night programming blocks. It also aired in Quebec on Télétoon's Télétoon la nuit block.

== Production ==
In July 2007, Syfy gave a script commitment to the series. Syfy later passed on making the show, but MTV gave it a script commitment in June 2009. After MTV passed, Hulu gave it a 10 episode, straight to series order in April 2013.

Season 1 was sponsored by Jack Link's Beef Jerky. The product appeared in mid-credits scenes.

The show marks Hulu's second foray into original scripted programming. The first season premiered online on August 1, 2013. On September 19, 2013, it was reported that Hulu had announced The Awesomes had been renewed for a second season. The second season premiered on August 4, 2014. On August 19, 2014, Hulu renewed The Awesomes for a third season. On December 17, 2015, Hulu canceled The Awesomes after three seasons and did not renew it for a fourth season due to low ratings.

The Awesomes was the first time Michael Tavera composed music for an adult animated series. Tavera has been well known for composing music for Cartoon Network's Time Squad, Disney's Lilo & Stitch: The Series, and Kids' WB's ¡Mucha Lucha!. Judd Winick, creator of The Life and Times of Juniper Lee, was the show's producer.

=== Connection to Saturday Night Live ===
The Awesomes had a strong association with the NBC weekly TV series Saturday Night Live, having starred many current and former SNL cast members including Seth Meyers, Bill Hader, Kenan Thompson, Taran Killam, Bobby Moynihan, Rachel Dratch, Maya Rudolph, Will Forte, Amy Poehler, Kate McKinnon, Colin Quinn, Fred Armisen, Tina Fey, Andy Samberg, Chris Kattan, Cecily Strong, Vanessa Bayer, Noël Wells, Nasim Pedrad and Aidy Bryant as well as SNL writers Steve Higgins, Emily Spivey, Paula Pell, Tim Robinson, Alex Baze and John Lutz. Lorne Michaels served as executive producer, as he has with many other SNL-associated shows. Meyers created the show and Meyers, Killam, Thompson, and Hader all had starring roles while Moynihan, Dratch, Rudolph, Forte, Poehler, McKinnon, Strong and Quinn each had either recurring roles or played various small parts. Of these cast members and writers, Colin Quinn was the only one whose time at SNL did not overlap with Meyers.

=== Connection to MADtv ===
Ike Barinholtz, Bobby Lee, Josh Meyers, Taran Killam, and David Herman were all cast members from the Fox series MADtv.
