= Cue card =

Cards that help speakers remember what to say

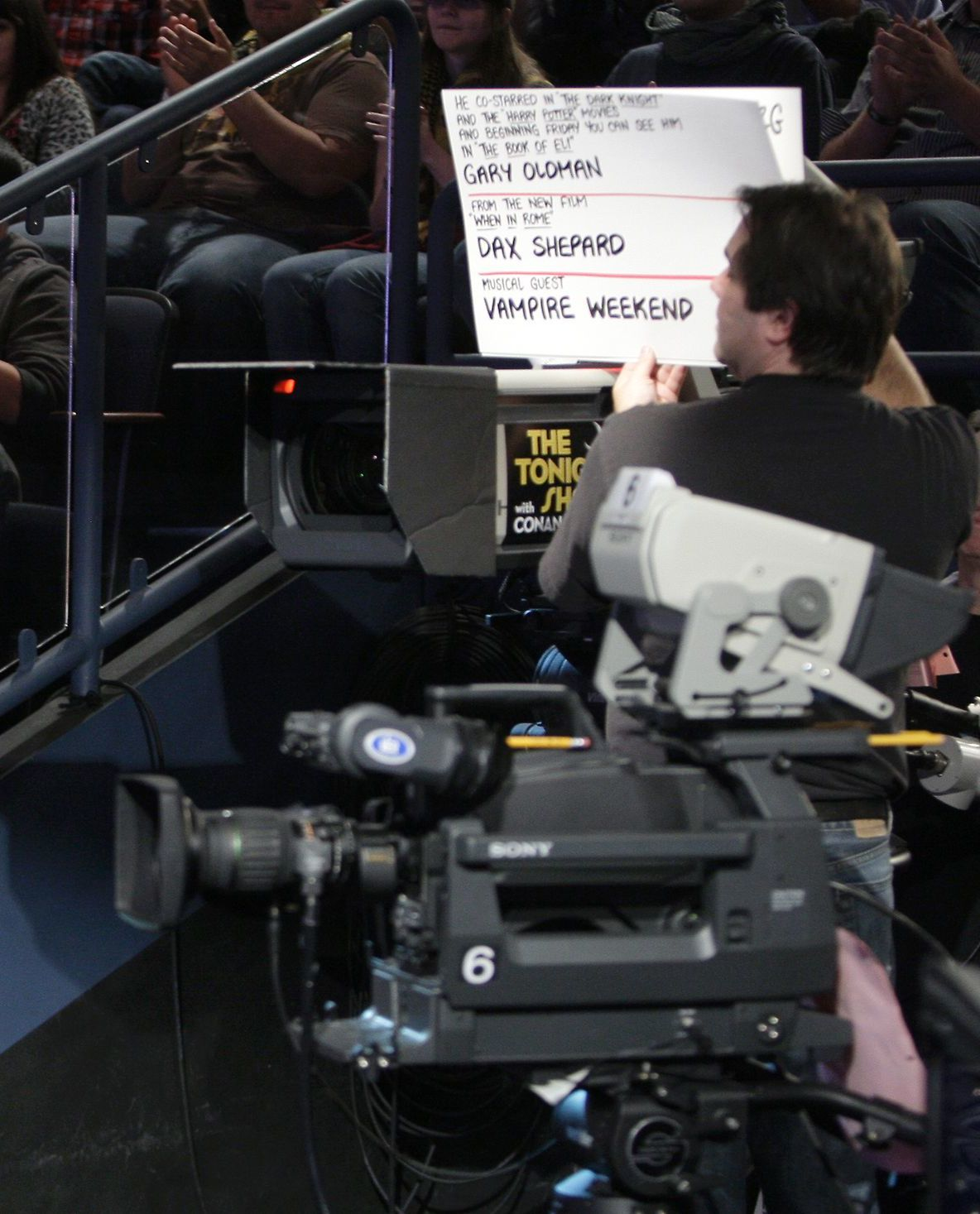
Man holding cue cards during a monologue on a late night TV show

Cue cards, also known as note cards, are cards with words written on them that help actors and speakers remember what they have to say. They are typically used in television productions where they can be held off-camera and are unseen by the audience. Cue cards are being used on many late night talk shows including The Tonight Show Starring Jimmy Fallon and Late Night with Seth Meyers as well as variety and sketch comedy shows like Saturday Night Live due to the practice of last-minute script changes. Many other TV shows, including game and reality shows, use cue cards due to their mobility, as a teleprompter only allows the actor or broadcaster to look directly into the camera.

== History ==
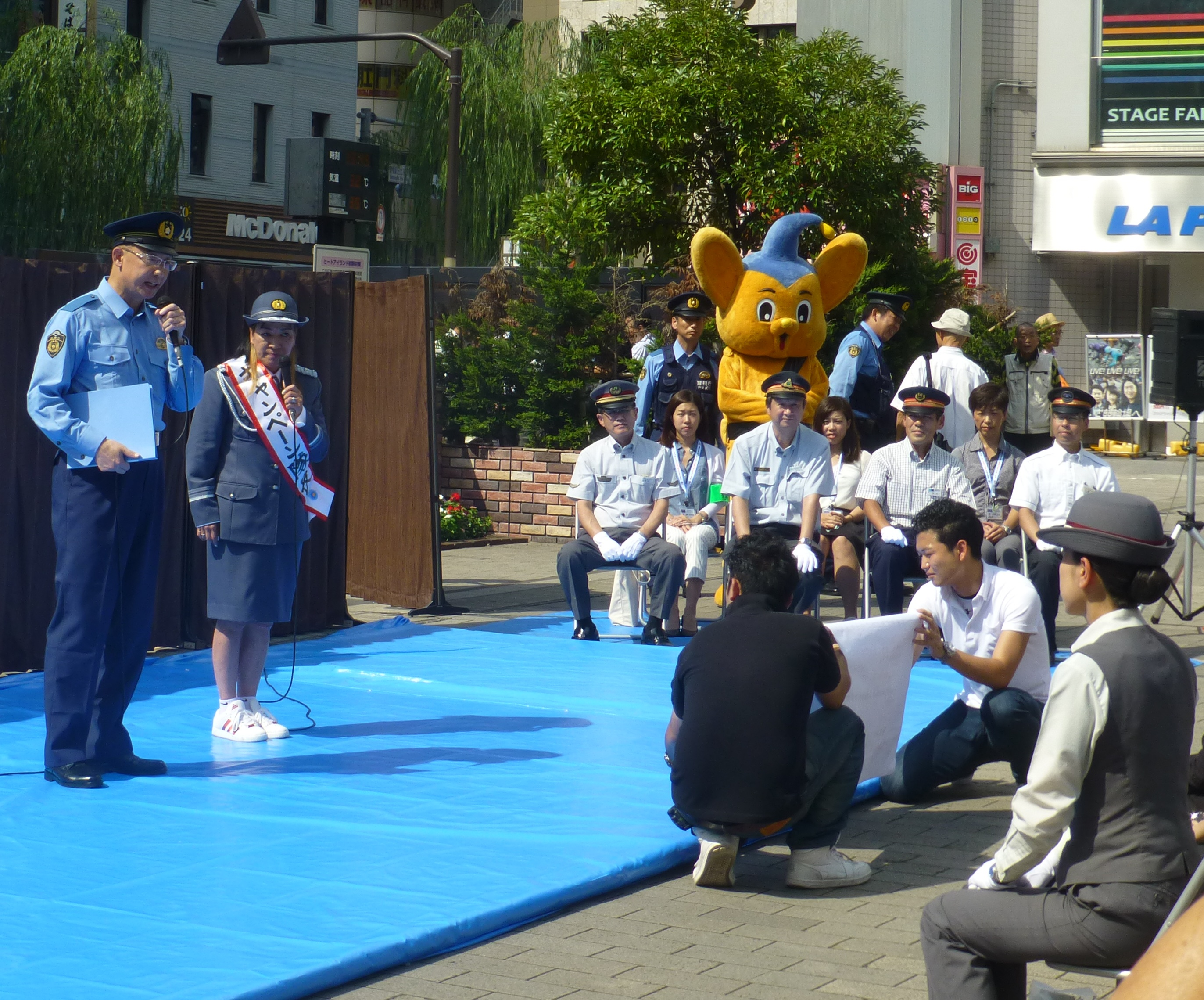
Two men (right, kneeling) hold cue cards to enable a public speech in Japan, 2016

Cue cards were originally used to aid aging actors. One early use was by John Barrymore in the late 1930s.

Cue cards did not become widespread until 1949 when Barney McNulty, a CBS page and former military pilot, was asked to write ailing actor Ed Wynn's script lines on large sheets of paper to help him remember his script. McNulty volunteered for this duty because his training as a pilot taught him to write very quickly and clearly. McNulty soon saw the necessity of this concept and formed the company "Ad-Libs". McNulty continued to be Bob Hope's personal cue card man until he stopped performing. McNulty, who died in 2000 at the age of 77, was known in Hollywood as the "Cue-Card King".

Marlon Brando was also a frequent user of cue cards, feeling that this helped bring realism and spontaneity to his performances, instead of giving the impression that he was merely reciting a writer's speech. During production of the film Last Tango in Paris, he had cue cards posted about the set, although director Bernardo Bertolucci declined his request to have lines written on actress Maria Schneider's rear end. Tony Mendez became a minor celebrity for his cue card work on the Late Show with David Letterman.

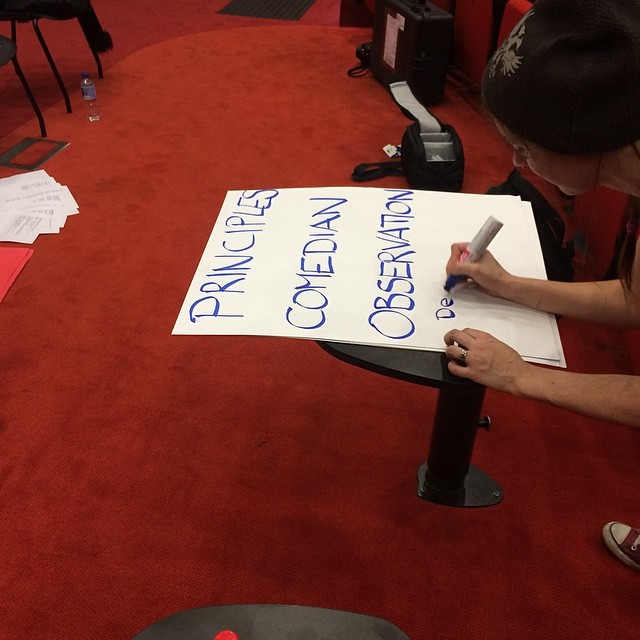
A cue card being prepared with simple one-word prompts

== Cue cards in video art ==
Occasionally, cue cards are incorporated into music videos as an artistic element themselves, as, for example, by Bob Dylan in his 1965 song "Subterranean Homesick Blues", by the Australian band INXS in their 1987 song "Mediate", by "Weird Al" Yankovic in his 2003 song "Bob" or by the German band Wir sind Helden in their 2005 song "Nur ein Wort" (Just one word).

== See also ==
- Cue (theatrical)
- Prompt book
- Prompter (opera) and Prompter (theatre)
- Subtitle
- Wally Feresten – cue card handler and supervisor known for his work on Saturday Night Live
