= List of Late Night with Seth Meyers episodes (2026) =

Season of television series

- No. of episodes: 110

Release
- Original network: NBC
- Original release: January 5, 2026

Season chronology
- ← Previous; 2025 episodes Next →

This is the list of episodes for Late Night with Seth Meyers in 2026.

== 2026 ==
=== January ===
No.	Original release date	Guest(s)	Musical/entertainment guest(s)
1748	January 5, 2026	Kristen Stewart, Wagner Moura	N/A
A Closer Look
1749	January 6, 2026	Karl-Anthony Towns, Shawn Levy, Andrew Ross Sorkin	N/A
Jokes Seth Can't Tell
1750	January 7, 2026	Jodie Foster, Simu Liu	N/A
A Closer Look
1751	January 8, 2026	Idris Elba, Marisa Abela	N/A
A Closer Look
1752	January 12, 2026	Emilia Clarke, Connor Storrie	N/A
A Closer Look
1753	January 13, 2026	Kristen Wiig, Lee Byung-hun, Jay Jurden	N/A
Late Night White House Press Briefing
1754	January 14, 2026	Alan Cumming, Ali Larter	N/A
A Closer Look
1755	January 15, 2026	Kenan Thompson, Carrie Coon	N/A
A Closer Look; Pernice LaFonk (Kenan Thompson)
1756	January 19, 2026	Sarah Silverman, Mark Strong	N/A
A Closer Look
1757	January 20, 2026	Billy Bob Thornton, Heidi Gardner, Molly Baz	N/A
The "Leave Him Alone Guy" Sticks Up for Stephen Miller
1758	January 21, 2026	Claire Foy, Bert Kreischer	N/A
A Closer Look
1759	January 22, 2026	Sean Hayes, Maria Taylor	N/A
A Closer Look
1760	January 26, 2026	Chris Hayes, Bob the Drag Queen	N/A
A Closer Look
1761	January 27, 2026	Stephen Colbert, Marc Shaiman	N/A
At This Point in the Broadcast: Seth's opinions on candles
1762	January 28, 2026	Denis Leary, Jamie Demetriou	N/A
A Closer Look
1763	January 29, 2026	Joel McHale, Alison Oliver	N/A
A Closer Look; John Lutz promotes Pepsi

=== February ===
No.	Original release date	Guest(s)	Musical/entertainment guest(s)
1764	February 2, 2026	Alexander Skarsgård, Paula Pell	N/A
A Closer Look
1765	February 3, 2026	Liam Neeson, Haley Lu Richardson, Amber Ruffin	N/A
Surprise Inspection!
1766	February 4, 2026	Kaley Cuoco, James Acaster	N/A
A Closer Look
1767	February 5, 2026	Nick Jonas, John Early	N/A
A Closer Look
1768	February 23, 2026	John Oliver, Ben Marshall	N/A
A Closer Look
1769	February 24, 2026	Tony Shalhoub, Jenny Slate, Chef Michael Vignola	N/A
The Scollywood Minute: Sinners, One Battle After Another and F1; John Lutz promotes Electric for All
1770	February 25, 2026	Lizzo, Jake Shane	N/A
A Closer Look
1771	February 26, 2026	Jon Hamm, Anderson .Paak	N/A
A Closer Look

=== March ===
No.	Original release date	Guest(s)	Musical/entertainment guest(s)
1772	March 2, 2026	Tracy Morgan, Cazzie David	N/A
A Closer Look
1773	March 3, 2026	Annette Bening, Robby Hoffman, Tayari Jones	N/A
Late Night White House Press Briefing
1774	March 4, 2026	David Harbour, John Cameron Mitchell	N/A
A Closer Look
1775	March 5, 2026	Seth MacFarlane	N/A
A Closer Look; Good Time Fun Wheel
1776	March 9, 2026	Cillian Murphy, Maggie Gyllenhaal	N/A
A Closer Look
1777	March 10, 2026	Nicolle Wallace, Rebecca Ferguson; Joe Santagato & Frank Alvarez	N/A
Amber Says What
1778	March 11, 2026	Kurt Russell; Marc Jacobs & Sofia Coppola	N/A
A Closer Look
1779	March 12, 2026	Kristin Chenoweth, Tom Blyth	N/A
A Closer Look
1780	March 16, 2026	Daniel Radcliffe, Kate Mara	N/A
A Closer Look
1781	March 17, 2026	Tessa Thompson, Steve Zahn, Mark Normand	N/A
Back in My Day
1782	March 18, 2026	Ryan Gosling, Jessie Ware	N/A
A Closer Look
1783	March 19, 2026	Anya Taylor-Joy, Shawn Hatosy	N/A
A Closer Look; John Lutz promotes Bubly Sparkling Water
1784	March 23, 2026	Sterling K. Brown, Rachel Dratch	N/A
A Closer Look
1785	March 24, 2026	Jim Parsons, Alana Haim, Chris Fleming	N/A
Jokes Seth Can't Tell
1786	March 25, 2026	Chelsea Handler, Eiza González	N/A
A Closer Look
1787	March 26, 2026	Amanda Peet, Vincent D'Onofrio	N/A
A Closer Look

=== April ===
No.	Original release date	Guest(s)	Musical/entertainment guest(s)
1788	April 20, 2026	Henry Winkler; Lea Michele, Aaron Tveit, & Nicholas Christopher	N/A
A Closer Look
1789	April 21, 2026	Aubrey Plaza, Gaten Matarazzo, Dan Bucatinsky	N/A
Surprise Inspection!
1790	April 22, 2026	Colman Domingo, Scott MacArthur	N/A
A Closer Look
1791	April 23, 2026	Charlize Theron, Jorma Taccone	N/A
A Closer Look
1792	April 27, 2026	Rose Byrne, Ebon Moss-Bachrach	N/A
A Closer Look
1793	April 28, 2026	Ayo Edebiri, Matthew Rhys, Sabrina Rudin	N/A
The Kind of Story We Need Right Now
1794	April 29, 2026	Lena Dunham, Karl Urban	N/A
A Closer Look
1795	April 30, 2026	Adam Scott, Juliette Lewis	N/A
A Closer Look; Kentucky Derby Horses

=== May ===
No.	Original release date	Guest(s)	Musical/entertainment guest(s)
1796	May 4, 2026	Nathan Lane, Noah Kahan	N/A
A Closer Look
1797	May 5, 2026	Chris Hayes, Meg Stalter, Caro Claire Burke	N/A
Late Night White House Press Briefing
1798	May 6, 2026	Maya Rudolph, Michael Gandolfini	N/A
A Closer Look
1799	May 7, 2026	Lisa Kudrow, Nicholas Braun	N/A
A Closer Look
1800	May 12, 2026	Tiffany Haddish, Josh Groban	N/A
Amber Says What
1801	May 13, 2026	Pedro Pascal, Billy Eichner, Jill Kargman	N/A
A Closer Look
1802	May 14, 2026	Nick Kroll, Isa Briones	N/A
A Closer Look

=== June ===
No.	Original release date	Guest(s)	Musical/entertainment guest(s)
1803	June 1, 2026	Brett Goldstein, David Sedaris	N/A
A Closer Look
1804	June 2, 2026	Anna Faris, P!nk, Ann Patchett	N/A
Jokes Seth Can't Tell
1805	June 3, 2026	Will Forte, Alison Brie	N/A
A Closer Look
1806	June 4, 2026	Paul Rudd, Rafael Nadal	N/A
A Closer Look
1807	June 8, 2026	Josh Gad & Andrew Rannells, Hannah Berner	N/A
A Closer Look
1808	June 9, 2026	Amy Adams, Dave Matthews, Jenny Hagel	N/A
The "Leave Him Alone Guy" Sticks Up for Pete Hegseth
1809	June 10, 2026	Emily Blunt; Mike Schur & Joe Posnanski	N/A
A Closer Look
1810	June 11, 2026	Bowen Yang & Matt Rogers, FINNEAS	N/A
A Closer Look
1811	June 15, 2026	Carmelo Anthony, Ana Gasteyer	N/A
A Closer Look
1812	June 16, 2026	Karl-Anthony Towns, Olivia Wilde, Stephen Root, Chef Ham El-Waylly	N/A
Karl-Anthony Towns makes a special appearance
1813	June 17, 2026	Kerry Washington, Alden Ehrenreich	N/A
A Closer Look; OG Anunoby makes a special appearance
1814	June 18, 2026	Kumail Nanjiani, Caleb Hearon	N/A
A Closer Look

=== July ===
No.	Original release date	Guest(s)	Musical/entertainment guest(s)
1815	July 13, 2026	Anne Hathaway, Alan Ritchson	N/A
A Closer Look
1816	July 14, 2026	Molly Shannon, Jake Johnson	N/A
Amber Says What
1817	July 15, 2026	Jon Bernthal, Stephanie Hsu	N/A
A Closer Look
1818	July 16, 2026	Matt Damon, Rebecca Lowe	N/A
A Closer Look
1819	July 20, 2026	Marcello Hernández, Minka Kelly	N/A
A Closer Look
1820	July 21, 2026	Leslie Jones, Jo Firestone	N/A
Late Night White House Press Briefing
1821	July 22, 2026	Tracee Ellis Ross, Luke Evans	N/A
A Closer Look
1822	July 23, 2026	Rosie O'Donnell, James Norton	N/A
A Closer Look
1823	July 27, 2026	Common, Brittany Broski	N/A
A Closer Look
1824	July 28, 2026	Tom Holland, Stavros Halkias, Dan Mintz	N/A
Surprise Inspection!
1825	July 29, 2026	Carey Mulligan, Mary Beth Barone	N/A
A Closer Look
1826	July 30, 2026	Timothy Olyphant, Cooper Hoffman	N/A
A Closer Look

=== September ===
No.	Original release date	Guest(s)	Musical/entertainment guest(s)
1827	September 21, 2026	Kelly Clarkson	N/A
A Closer Look
1828	September 22, 2026	Jon Hamm, Sabrina Impacciatore, Taylor Tomlinson	N/A
Jokes Seth Can't Tell
1829	September 23, 2026	Ethan Hawke, Zara Larsson	N/A
A Closer Look
1830	September 24, 2026	Kenan Thompson, Sandra Hüller	N/A
A Closer Look; Pernice LaFonk (Kenan Thompson)
1831	September 28, 2026	Kate McKinnon, Christopher Abbott	N/A
A Closer Look
1832	September 29, 2026	Rachel Maddow, Eric Idle, Danny Meyer	N/A
Late Night White House Press Briefing
1833	September 30, 2026	Florence Pugh, Ms. Pat	N/A
A Closer Look

=== October ===
No.	Original release date	Guest(s)	Musical/entertainment guest(s)
1834	October 1, 2026	Dakota Johnson, Mike Tomlin	N/A
A Closer Look
1835	October 5, 2026	Jessica Biel, Slayyyter	N/A
A Closer Look
1836	October 6, 2026	Sebastian Stan, Jane Wickline, George Saunders	N/A
Surprise Inspection!
1837	October 7, 2026	Ben Affleck, David Byrne	N/A
A Closer Look
1838	October 8, 2026	James McAvoy, José Andrés	N/A
A Closer Look
1839	October 19, 2026	Jenna Ortega, Ina Garten	N/A
A Closer Look
1840	October 20, 2026	Quinta Brunson, Stephen Graham, Owen Thiele	N/A
Amber Says What
1841	October 21, 2026	Liam Neeson, Rachel Kaly	N/A
A Closer Look
1842	October 22, 2026	Helen Mirren, John Turturro	N/A
A Closer Look
1843	October 26, 2026	Liev Schreiber, Morgan Spector	N/A
A Closer Look
1844	October 27, 2026	Bowen Yang, Bradley Whitford, Jessica Tarlov	N/A
At This Point in the Broadcast
1845	October 28, 2026	Sharon Horgan, Justin Hartley	N/A
A Closer Look
1846	October 29, 2026	Rose Byrne, George Fouracres	N/A
A Closer Look; text messages to Texas residents attacking Senate candidate James Talarico

=== November ===
No.	Original release date	Guest(s)	Musical/entertainment guest(s)
1847	November 2, 2026	Daniel Radcliffe, Paula Pell	N/A
A Closer Look
1848	November 4, 2026	John Malkovich, Gabby Windey	N/A
A Closer Look
1849	November 5, 2026	Awkwafina, Martin McDonagh	N/A
A Closer Look
1850	November 6, 2026	Kim Kardashian, Jeff Hiller	N/A
Surprise Inspection!; John Lutz Makes a Passionate Argument About Something He Didn't Know He'd Have to Make a Passionate Argument About (data centers)
1851	November 9, 2026	Julia Louis-Dreyfus, Jamie Dornan	N/A
A Closer Look
1852	November 10, 2026	Timothy Olyphant, Harper Steele	N/A
Things We Can All Agree On
1853	November 11, 2026	Dustin Hoffman, James Acaster	N/A
1854	November 12, 2026	John C. Reilly, Diane Morgan	N/A
1855	November 16, 2026	Chris Hayes, Kate Berlant	N/A
1856	November 17, 2026	Blake Griffin, Brittany Snow	N/A
1857	November 18, 2026	Amy Poehler, Andrew Scott	N/A
1858	November 19, 2026	Miles Teller, Celia Imrie	N/A
1859	November 23, 2026	Adam Driver, Betty Gilpin	N/A
1860	November 24, 2026	Ben Stiller; Marla Mindelle & Josh Sharp	N/A
1861	November 25, 2026	Hoda Kotb, Matt Rogers	N/A
1862	November 26, 2026	The Meyers Family; Tina Fey & Amy Poehler	N/A
