= Wally Feresten =

American cue card handler

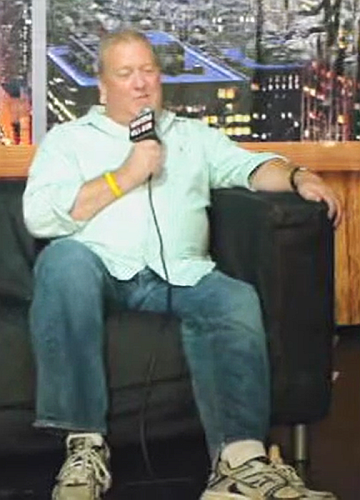
- Feresten in 2011
- Born: Chris Feresten; 1965 or 1966 (age 59–60); Fall River, Massachusetts, U.S.
- Occupation: Cue card supervisor
- Years active: 1990-present
- Known for: Saturday Night Live
- Children: 2
- Relatives: Spike Feresten (brother)

Chris "Wally" Feresten (born 1965 or 1966) is an American cue card handler and supervisor known for his work on Saturday Night Live. He also does cue cards for Late Night with Seth Meyers and his private business, Cue Cards by Wally.

== Early life and education ==
Feresten was born in Fall River, Massachusetts to parents Mary Jo and Michael Feresten. His brother is television writer Spike Feresten. Feresten attended West Bridgewater High School and, later, Syracuse University. In 1987, he moved to Los Angeles. Three years later, he moved to New York City.

== Career ==
Feresten began working at Saturday Night Live after his brother, who worked at SNL as a receptionist at the time, informed him there was a vacancy in the cue card department. Feresten's first cue card handling job was in 1990 during a "Sprockets" sketch featuring host Kyle MacLachlan. His first appearance on camera was in 1991 during a monologue featuring Steve Martin. Feresten had his first spoken lines on the show in 1993 during an Alec Baldwin monologue. Feresten became the cue card handler for Last Call with Carson Daly when the show moved to New York.

Since 2014, Feresten has also been a cue card handler for Late Night with Seth Meyers. He has appeared on camera on the show several times including once as an interview guest when Action Bronson did not appear. His increasing frequency of spoken lines and his popularity with the audience has caused guest John Oliver to joke that Feresten is staging "a slow-motion coup".

In 2020, Feresten began Cue Cards by Wally, a private business wherein he creates personalized cue cards, mostly for SNL fans. He started the business while SNL was doing remote-recorded episodes and, thus, his cue cards were not needed.

== Personal life ==
Feresten lives in Livingston, New Jersey.

== Filmography ==
=== Television ===
Year	Work
1990–present	Saturday Night Live
2014–present	Late Night with Seth Meyers
2021	The Amber Ruffin Show
