= Ben Warheit =

American actor

- Born: Benjamin Warheit; Wilmington, Delaware, US
- Occupation(s): Actor, comedian, screenwriter
- Known for: Late Night with Seth Meyers, Joker

Benjamin Warheit is an American actor, comedian and writer. He has been a writer for Late Night with Seth Meyers since 2014. He has been nominated for the Primetime Emmy Award for Outstanding Writing for a Variety Series five times for writing on Late Night.

== Career ==
Warheit attended the University of Delaware where he majored in neuroscience. After graduating in 2009, he moved to New York and began working as a research associate in the Heroin & Opiates Addiction lab of Columbia University's Department of Psychiatry. At the same time he began writing and performing in videos and stage productions around New York City, and wrote and performed in several shows at UCB Theatre. In 2012, Warheit was drawing cartoons on post-it notes in his lab office, and posting them daily to his Tumblr blog, which led to Above Average Productions ordering an animated web series based on his post-it drawings. The resulting series, Waco Valley, ran 6 episodes online before Comedy Central ordered a half-hour TV pilot of the series. The pilot script that Warheit wrote ended up in the hands of Seth Meyers who was looking for writers for his Hulu series, The Awesomes, and hired Warheit to write and direct for the show. A month later, Meyers was named the new host of Late Night, and brought on Warheit as a staff writer. Warheit regularly performs on the show as characters and as himself, and created some of the show's signature pieces, including Ya Burnt, Back In My Day, and Seth's Nephew Derrick. In 2019, Warheit appeared in the psychological thriller Joker and romantic comedy A Rainy Day in New York.

== Filmography ==
- 2014–2015: The Awesomes (TV series) – writer, producer, various voices
- 2014–current: Late Night With Seth Meyers (TV series) – Writer, various characters / himself
- 2019: A Rainy Day in New York – Alvin Troller
- 2019: Joker – The Wall Street Three
- 2019: The Marvelous Mrs. Maisel (TV series) – Nicholas
- 2020: Mapleworth Murders (TV series) – Ben Jr.
- 2020: Season's Greetings – Ben
- 2020: Animaniacs (TV series) – Writer
- 2021: Helpsters (TV series) – Piano Paul
- 2023: Molli and Max in the Future – @FartJuice69
- 2025: The Life List – Jackson
