= List of programs broadcast by CNN =

This is a list of news programs broadcast by CNN, a 24-hour cable news network.

This list details live and original programming and does not include the scheduling of evening and overnight repeats or simulcasts of CNN International, which is aired at various points when the channel is not broadcasting its own live programming.

== Current programming ==
=== Weekday programming ===
Program	Launched	Time slot (ET)	Anchor	Location	Simulcast (CNNI)
American Pulse	Jan 2026	4 AM – 5 AM	None (anchorless newscast)	Various	—N/a
CNN Headline Express	May 2026	5 AM – 6 AM	Brad Smith	Atlanta	5 AM – 8:30 AM (ET)
CNN This Morning	Jan 2012	6 AM – 7 AM	Audie Cornish	Washington, D.C.	5 AM – 8:30 AM (ET)
CNN News Central	Apr 2023	7 AM – 8 AM	John Berman, Kate Bolduan & Sara Sidner	New York City	5 AM – 8:30 AM (ET)
CNN News Central	Apr 2023	8 AM – 9 AM	John Berman, Kate Bolduan & Sara Sidner	New York City	5 AM – 8:30 AM (ET)
CNN News Central	Apr 2023	9 AM – 10 AM	John Berman, Kate Bolduan & Sara Sidner	New York City	5 AM – 8:30 AM (ET)
The Situation Room	Mar 2025	10 AM – 11 AM	Wolf Blitzer & Pamela Brown	Washington, D.C.	—N/a
The Situation Room	Mar 2025	11 AM – 12 PM	Wolf Blitzer & Pamela Brown	Washington, D.C.	—N/a
Inside Politics	Sep 2016	12 PM – 1 PM	Dana Bash	Washington, D.C.	—N/a
CNN News Central	Apr 2023	1 PM – 2 PM	Brianna Keilar & Boris Sanchez	Washington, D.C.	—N/a
CNN News Central	Apr 2023	2 PM – 3 PM	Brianna Keilar & Boris Sanchez	Washington, D.C.	—N/a
CNN News Central	Apr 2023	3 PM – 4 PM	Brianna Keilar & Boris Sanchez	Washington, D.C.	—N/a
The Arena with Kasie Hunt	Mar 2025	4 PM – 5 PM	Kasie Hunt	Washington, D.C.	—N/a
The Lead	Mar 2013	5 PM – 7 PM	Jake Tapper	Washington, D.C.	5 PM – 5:30 PM (ET)
Erin Burnett OutFront	Oct 2011	7 PM – 8 PM	Erin Burnett	New York City	7 PM – 2 AM (ET)
Anderson Cooper 360°	Sep 2003	8 PM – 9 PM	Anderson Cooper	New York City	7 PM – 2 AM (ET)
The Source	Jul 2023	9 PM – 10 PM	Kaitlan Collins	Washington, D.C.	7 PM – 2 AM (ET)
CNN NewsNight	Oct 2023	10 PM – 11 PM	Abby Phillip	New York City	7 PM – 2 AM (ET)
Laura Coates Live	Oct 2023	11 PM – 12 AM	Laura Coates	Washington, D.C.	7 PM – 2 AM (ET)
The Story Is with Elex Michaelson	Oct 2025	12 – 2 AM	Elex Michaelson	Los Angeles	7 PM – 2 AM (ET)

=== Saturday programming ===
Program	Launched	Time slot (ET)	Anchor	Location	Simulcast (CNNI)
The Story Is with Elex Michaelson	Oct 2025	12 – 2 AM	Elex Michaelson	Los Angeles	12 – 1:30 AM (ET)
CNN This Morning Weekend	Nov 2022	6 AM – 7 AM	Victor Blackwell	Atlanta	—N/a
CNN This Morning Weekend	Nov 2022	7 AM – 8 AM	Victor Blackwell	Atlanta	7 AM – 10 AM (ET)
First of All	Oct 2023	8 AM – 9 AM	Victor Blackwell	Atlanta	7 AM – 10 AM (ET)
Smerconish	Mar 2014	9 AM – 10 AM	Michael Smerconish	Philadelphia	7 AM – 10 AM (ET)
Table for Five	Jan 2025	10 AM – 11 AM	Abby Phillip	New York City	—N/a
The Amanpour Hour	Nov 2023	11 AM – 12 PM	Christiane Amanpour	London	11 AM – 12 PM (ET)
The Arena: Saturday	Dec 2025	12 PM – 1 PM	Kasie Hunt	Washington, D.C.	—N/a
CNN Newsroom	Sep 2006	1 PM – 5 PM	Fredricka Whitfield	Atlanta	1 PM – 5 PM (ET)
CNN Newsroom	Sep 2006	5 PM – 8 PM	Jessica Dean	New York City	6 PM – 8 PM (ET)

=== Sunday programming ===
Program	Launched	Time slot (ET)	Anchor	Location	Simulcast (CNNI)
CNN This Morning Weekend	Nov 2022	6 AM – 7 AM	Victor Blackwell	Atlanta	—N/a
CNN This Morning Weekend	Nov 2022	7 AM – 8 AM	Victor Blackwell	Atlanta	7 AM – 12 AM (ET)
Inside Politics Sunday	Feb 2014	8 AM – 9 AM	Manu Raju	Washington, D.C.	7 AM – 12 AM (ET)
State of the Union	Jan 2009	9 AM – 10 AM	Jake Tapper and Dana Bash	Washington, D.C.	7 AM – 12 AM (ET)
Fareed Zakaria GPS	Jun 2008	10 AM – 11 AM	Fareed Zakaria	New York City	7 AM – 12 AM (ET)
Inside Politics Sunday (Replay)	Feb 2014	11 AM – 12 PM	Manu Raju	Washington, D.C.	7 AM – 12 AM (ET)
State of the Union (Replay)	Jan 2009	12 PM – 1 PM	Jake Tapper and Dana Bash	Washington, D.C.	—N/a
Fareed Zakaria GPS (Replay)	Jan 2009	1 PM – 2 PM	Fareed Zakaria	New York City	—N/a
CNN Newsroom	Sep 2006	2 PM – 5 PM	Fredricka Whitfield	Atlanta	2 PM – 5 PM (ET)
CNN Newsroom	Sep 2006	5 PM – 8 PM	Jessica Dean	New York City	6 PM – 8 PM (ET)
The Whole Story	Apr 2023	8 PM – 9 PM	Anderson Cooper	New York City	—N/a

=== CNN Original Series ===
Program	Launched	Description
Have I Got News for You	Sep 14, 2024	Based on the British game show of the same name, Roy Wood Jr. and team captains Amber Ruffin and Michael Ian Black serve up a take on the news of the week and guide guests through comic games and panels that test their knowledge of current events.

=== Broadcast specials ===
- CNN Newsroom Live (simulcast on CNNI outside of primetime hours during breaking news events of major significance)
- Election Night in America (flagship banner for CNN's election coverage, simulcast on CNNI)
- New Year's Eve Live (annual coverage of Times Square's ball drop festivities, simulcast on CNNI)

=== Special programming ===
- CNN Heroes (2007–present)
- The Arena: Saturday with Kasie Hunt (2025–present)

== Upcoming programming ==
- Decades in Sports (premieres 2026)
- New Orleans

== Former programming ==
Program	Terms	Description
AC360° Later	2013–14	An occasional spin-off of Anderson Cooper 360° that featured panel discussions on recent events led by Cooper. After being faced with irregular and inconsistent scheduling (sometimes being replaced by factual programs or reruns of the evening's earlier broadcast of AC360° in its 10:00 p.m. Eastern Time slot), it was discontinued in February 2014.
Amanpour		Now airs daily on CNNI.
American Morning	2001–11	A weekday morning news program which aired from 7–10, then 6–10, and finally 6–9 a.m. Eastern Time. Replaced by Starting Point.
Around the World	2012–14	An hour-long weekday news program that focused on international headlines, and was anchored by Suzanne Malveaux and Michael Holmes. Formerly Newsroom International before its title was changed in late February 2013. Replaced by Legal View.
At This Hour with Kate Bolduan	January 26, 2015 – March 31, 2023	A news program focusing on various news stories of the day, and anchored by Kate Bolduan. Moved to CNN News Central on April 3, 2023.
Ballot Bowl	2008	An election news program focused on the 2008 presidential and (occasionally) congressional races.
Both Sides with Jesse Jackson	1992–2000	A political talk show, hosted by civil rights leader and two-time presidential candidate Jesse Jackson, aired on Sundays. Each program began with a short taped report on the topic by CNN correspondent John Bisney. The show ran from 1992 to 2000.
Burden of Proof	1995–2001	A show that discussed the legal issues of the day, hosted by Greta Van Susteren and Roger Cossack.
Business Day		Weekday early morning business news program broadcast for an hour beginning 6:00 a.m. Eastern Time.
Campbell Brown	2008–10	A political debate show hosted by Campbell Brown. The program ended after Brown resigned from CNN.
Capital Gang	1988–2005	One of cable news' longest-running programs, focusing on discussions of the week's political news stories. The original panelists were Pat Buchanan, Al Hunt, Mark Shields and Robert Novak. When Buchanan left CNN to run for president, Margaret Warner, Mona Charen and later Margaret Carlson and Kate O'Beirne became regular panelists. Capital Gang aired Saturday nights at 7:00 p.m. Eastern Time from 1988 to 2005.
The Chris Wallace Show	November 4, 2023 – November 23, 2024	A Saturday morning interview show hosted by Chris Wallace. Canceled on his departure after his contract expired.
CNN Daybreak	1980–2005	A first look at the day's stories that aired live from New York City at 5:00 a.m. Eastern Time.
CNN Live Saturday/CNN Live Sunday	Unknown–2006	A weekend news and analysis program, airing live from Atlanta. Anchored by Fredricka Whitfield from 12:00–6:00 p.m. Eastern Time and Carol Lin from 6:00–11:00 p.m. Eastern Time. Replaced in 2006 by CNN Newsroom Weekend.
CNN Live Today	2001–06	A program that provided a daily look at current news stories, airing live from Atlanta Monday through Friday at 10:00 a.m.–12:00 p.m. Eastern Time. Anchored by Daryn Kagan.
CNN Right Now with Brianna Keilar	November 12, 2018 – March 26, 2021	Anchored by Brianna Keilar, A program that provided a breakdown of the headlines with a mix of reporters, analysts, and newsmakers. The program aired its last episode on March 26, 2021, due to Brianna Keilar moving to New Day.
CNN Morning News		Weekday morning news program which was broadcast Monday through Friday at 9:00 a.m.–12:00 p.m. Eastern Time.
CNN NewsSite	2001	A news program which incorporated participation via the internet; based out of Atlanta, it was anchored by Joie Chen that aired Monday through Friday at 4:00 p.m. Eastern Time.
CNN Saturday Morning/CNN Sunday Morning	Unknown–2006	
CNN Saturday Night/CNN Sunday Night	Unknown–2006	The channel's weekend evening news program, airing at 6:00 and 10:00 p.m. Eastern Time and anchored by Carol Lin. Replaced in 2006 by CNN Newsroom Weekend.
CNN Sports Sunday		Co-anchored by Bob Kurtz and Nick Charles.
CNN Today		Early afternoon news program.
CNN WorldView	1995–2001	International news program broadcast at 6:00 p.m. Eastern Time. Also broadcast on CNN International.
Computer Connection		A program focusing on issues and advancements in the computer industry.
Connie Chung Tonight	2002–03	A news and analysis program, hosted by Connie Chung. Canceled in March 2003.
Crossfire	First aired from 1982 to 2005, and again from 2013 to 2014	Crossfire was a nightly current events debate television program that aired on CNN for many years. The show's format was designed to present and challenge the opinions of a politically liberal pundit, and a conservative pundit.
Cuomo Prime Time	August 28, 2017 – November 29, 2021	A news analysis show hosted by Chris Cuomo. In late 2021, Cuomo was fired for helping his brother, a governor of New York.
Diplomatic License	1994–2006	A weekly program on CNN International hosted by Richard Roth, focusing on the United Nations.
D. L. Hughley Breaks the News	2008–09	D. L. Hughley talks to newsmakers, pundits and ordinary people about what's going on in the world.
Don Lemon Tonight	April 14, 2014 – October 7, 2022	A summary of the day's headlines hosted by Don Lemon. In September 2022, Don Lemon would host a new morning show for the network alongside Poppy Harlow and Kaitlan Collins.
Early Edition	mid-1990s–2001	Weekday breakfast program which was broadcast on weekdays between 7:00 a.m. and 9:00 a.m. Eastern Time. Replaced by American Morning in 2001.
Early Start with Rahel Solomon	2025–26	Early morning program which was broadcast on weekdays between 5:00 a.m. and 6:00 a.m. The program ended when Solomon departed CNN. It was replaced by a simulcast of one hour of CNN Headline Express.
Evans and Novak	1980–2002	Saturday night political interview program hosted by Rowland Evans and Robert Novak. The show's title was changed to Evans, Novak, Hunt & Shields in 1998 when Al Hunt and Mark Shields became permanent panelists. Following Evans' death in 2001, the title was changed to Novak, Hunt & Shields, which remained until its cancellation.
First Evening News	2001	A half-hour news program was anchored by Bill Hemmer, originally airing at 6:00 p.m. Eastern Time when it debuted in June 2001 before moving to 7:00 p.m. the following month, where it remained until it ended on September 10, 2001.
Freeman Reports	1980–85	One of the channel's original programs from 1980. Host Sandi Freeman interviewed guests and took live telephone call-ins regarding current news events and other topics of interest. For a brief period, the program featured a live audience based in Atlanta. The program's former timeslot was later occupied by Larry King Live.
Future Watch		A program focusing on issues and advancements in the technological industry.
(Get to) The Point	2013	A panel discussion program featuring Donny Deutsch, Rick Reilly, Margaret Hoover, and Jason Taylor; was announced and premiered on April 1, 2013, as a week-long trial.
Global View	1994–99	International policy interview show hosted by world affairs correspondent Ralph Begleiter, aired weekly on CNN (1994–95) and CNN International (1994–99). Each edition began with a story package on the subject by Begleiter, followed by a lengthy interview with international figure and ended with a brief "Reporter's Notebook" segment, featuring insider tidbits from the host's extensive travels covering global politics.
Greenfield at Large	2001–02	A half-hour weeknight news analysis program that was anchored by Jeff Greenfield and based in New York City.
In the Arena	2010–11	Originally titled Parker Spitzer and hosted by Kathleen Parker and Eliot Spitzer, the hour-long early primetime program featured discussions on the day's news with top journalists and contributors.
John King, USA	2010–12	Hosted by John King, the program discussed the day's political news.
King Charles	November 29, 2023 – April 10, 2024	A Wednesday-only nightly news discussion show hosted by Gayle King and Charles Barkley.
Larry King Live	1985–2010	Hosted by Larry King, the hour-long interview program was CNN's longest running program as well as its most-watched, with over one million viewers nightly.
Late Edition with Wolf Blitzer	1993–2009	Hosted by Wolf Blitzer, the program is "the last word in Sunday talk" and a prime source for front-page news on Monday morning. "Late Edition" offers a superior combination of thorough interviews with top newsmakers and expert discussion.
Legal View with Ashleigh Banfield	August 12, 2013 – September 16, 2016	A weekday legal stories program, hosted by Ashleigh Banfield.
Live From...		A weekday early afternoon newscast, airing live from Atlanta, featuring a lively look at the day's stories. Anchored by Kyra Phillips.
Live from the Headlines	2003	Hosted by Paula Zahn, the two-hour primetime show (airing from 7:00–9:00 p.m. Eastern Time) debuted at the same time Zahn moved from her previous morning slot; it was later co-hosted by Anderson Cooper. The program was replaced by Paula Zahn Now in 2003.
Lou Dobbs Tonight	1980–2009	Anchored by Lou Dobbs, the business news and analysis program originally aired as Moneyline before relaunching as Lou Dobbs Tonight in 2003.
NewsNight with Aaron Brown	2001–05	A hard-news program anchored by Aaron Brown, which took an in-depth look at the main U.S. and international stories of the day. Was Canceled on November 5, 2005, leading to Brown's immediate resignation from CNN.
Newsstand	1999–2001	A weeknight newsmagazine series.
Next@CNN	2002–05	A weekend science and technology oriented program, hosted by Daniel Sieberg.
New Day	2013–22	The former CNN Morning show. The show ended on October 31, 2022, and was replaced by CNN This Morning (2022). New Day Weekend later became CNN This Morning Weekend starting on the weekend of November 5.
On the Story	Unknown–2006	Anchored by Ali Velshi, it was CNN's interactive "week-in-review" series featuring an in-depth look at the story behind some of the week's biggest stories. However, the show was suspended in June 2006, and was later Canceled that July.
Paula Zahn Now	2003–07	A newsmagazine that featured a look at the current issues affecting the world, with former CBS and Fox News anchor Paula Zahn. The program ended on August 2, 2007.
People in the News	2001–05	A feature-formatted weekend program produced in conjunction with People magazine, which profiled newsmakers from the worlds of politics, sports, business, medicine and entertainment. The program aired on and was first hosted by Daryn Kagan and later by Paula Zahn.
People Now	1980–Unknown	A live hour-long program, based at the CNN Los Angeles bureau, featuring celebrity interviews and discussions on entertainment news stories. Originally hosted by Lee Leonard, the program was later hosted by Mike Douglas, who himself was replaced by Bill Tush in December 1982.
Piers Morgan Live	2011–14	An hour-long weeknight interview program hosted by Piers Morgan (which was broadcast live on most nights, with some pre-recorded broadcasts), often featuring celebrity interviews; serving as a replacement for Larry King Live, the program ended on March 28, 2014, and was replaced by Don Lemon Tonight.
Pinnacle	Unknown–2004	A business program, hosted by Tom Cassidy, featuring news and interviews with industry leaders.
The Point with Greta Van Susteren	2001–02	A primetime news and interview program, hosted by Greta Van Susteren. Canceled when Van Susteren moved to Fox News Channel.
Prime News		CNN's primetime news program airing at 8:00 p.m.
Reliable Sources	1992–2022	Anchored by Brian Stelter, this one-hour long program featured analyses of the American news media.
Rick's List	2010	Anchored by Rick Sanchez, the two-hour afternoon program featured discussions of the day's news with interaction from viewers via social networking sites such as Facebook and Twitter. Sanchez was fired from the channel after making controversial statements about Jewish people on a radio show (see Controversy for further details).
Sanjay Gupta MD	2013–14	Medical news program hosted by Dr. Sanjay Gupta, aired Saturdays at 4:30 p.m. and Sundays at 7:30 a.m. eastern.
Science and Technology Week	Unknown–2001	A weekly half-hour program featuring scientific and technology reports and commentary on the week's news headlines on those subjects. Anchored most recently by Miles O'Brien.
Showbiz Today	1984–2001	Entertainment news program broadcast live on weekday later afternoons. Ended September 10, 2001.
Sonya / Sonya Live in L.A.	1987–94	A weekday call-in show airing at 1:00 p.m. Eastern Time, hosted by Dr. Sonya Friedman. Replaced by Talkback Live.
The Spin Room	2001	A half-hour weeknight primetime political talk show hosted by Tucker Carlson and Bill Press.
Sports Tonight	1980–2001	A nightly sports news program co-anchored by Nick Charles and Fred Hickman.
Starting Point	2012–13	A two-hour weekday morning news program, anchored by Soledad O'Brien. Replaced by New Day.
Style with Elsa Klensch	1980–2000	A weekly half-hour Saturday morning program that featured news on style and fashion.
Talkback Live	1994–2003	A call-in talk show with a live audience; originally hosted by Susan Rook, its subsequent hosts were Bobbie Battista, Karyn Bryant, and Arthel Neville.
Unguarded with Rachel Nichols	2013–14	CNN's weekly sports show hosted by Rachel Nichols, aired Friday nights at 10:30 Eastern and Pacific.
Weekend Early Start	2012–13	The weekend morning newscast is anchored by Randi Kaye and Victor Blackwell from 6–7:30 a.m. Eastern Time. The program debuted on March 10, 2012, and was broadcast until June 22, 2013, when it was rebranded to its weekday follower, New Day, as New Day Weekend.
Wolf	2014–18	An hour long weekday program with a breakdown of the headlines as they happen. Replaced by CNN Right Now
Wolf Blitzer Reports	2001–05	An hour-long late afternoon program, broadcast live from the Washington, D.C., bureau, featuring a look at the day's news stories. Replaced by The Situation Room in 2005.
Your Bottom Line	2009–10	A news program focusing on financial news hosted by Christine Romans.
Your Health		A weekend afternoon program focusing on health news.

=== Original series ===
Program	Terms	Description
The 2010s	2023	Five-part miniseries documenting the political and social upheaval that defined the decade between 2010 and 2019.
American Style	2019	Four-part miniseries examines how America's changing style trends have historically mirrored the political, social, and economic climate of the nation.
The 2000s	2018	The documentary miniseries "explore[s] the cultural and political milestones of the decade, including technological triumphs like the iPhone and social media, President George W. Bush's war on terror and response to Hurricane Katrina, Barack Obama's presidential election and the 2008 financial crisis, hip-hop's rise to dominance and a creative renaissance in television".
1968: The Year that Changed America	2018	Four-part series looks back half a century at a year marked by the assassinations of MLK and RFK, a contentious presidential election and the escalating anti-Vietnam War sentiment.
Soundtracks: Songs That Defined History	2017	The documentary miniseries "explores the music tied to iconic moments in history, from the March on Washington to the riots at Stonewall, to the Moon landing to Hurricane Katrina."
The History of Comedy	2017–18	The documentary series "explores the underlying questions of what makes American people laugh, why, and how the laughter influenced their social and political landscape throughout the history."
The Nineties	2017	The documentary miniseries "explores the decade that gave us the Internet, DVDs, and other cultural and political milestones."
Race for the White House	2016	Notable US presidential election races throughout American history are examined.
The Eighties	2016	The documentary miniseries "explores the Reagan presidency, the AIDS crisis, the end of the Cold War, Wall Street corruption, the tech boom, the expansion of television, and the evolving music industry."
The Seventies	2015	The documentary miniseries "explores the ongoing Vietnam War, the Watergate scandal, evolving music industry, the Iran Hostage Crisis, the sexual revolution, and the rise of foreign and domestic terrorism."
The Sixties	2014	The documentary miniseries "explores the politics, music, technical advancements, drugs and the 'free love' movement of the 1960s."

Other series and films

- American Prince: JFK Jr. (2025)
- Anthony Bourdain: Parts Unknown (2013–18)
- Believer (2017)
- Billionaire Boys Club (2025)
- Chasing Life with Dr. Sanjay Gupta (2019)
- Chicagoland (2014)
- Christiane Amanpour Sex & Love Around the World (2018)
- Cold War (1998)
- Craig Ferguson: American on Purpose (2026)
- Declassified: Untold Stories of American Spies (2016–19)
- Disaster: The Chernobyl Meltdown (2026)
- Eva Longoria: Searching for France (2026)
- Eva Longoria: Searching for Mexico (2023)
- Eva Longoria: Searching for Spain (2025)
- First Ladies (2020)
- History of the Sitcom (2021)
- How It Really Happened (2024), previously aired on HLN from 2016 to 2022.
- The Hunt with John Walsh (2014–17)
- I'm Chevy Chase and You're Not (2026)
- Jerusalem: City of Faith and Fury (2021)
- Kara Swisher Wants to Live Forever (2026)
- The Kennedys (2018)
- Live Aid: When Rock 'n' Roll Took Over the World (2025)
- Lockerbie: The Bombing of Pan Am 103 (2025)
- Long Road to Hell: America in Iraq (2015)
- The Messy Truth with Van Jones (2016 documentary series and 2017 studio programs)
- Millennium (1999)
- Morgan Spurlock Inside Man (2013–16)
- The Movies (2019)
- Pope: The Most Powerful Man in History (2018)
- The Radical Story of Patty Hearst (2018)
- Stanley Tucci: Searching for Italy (2021–22)
- The Story of Late Night (2021)
- The Redemption Project with Van Jones (2019)
- See It Loud: The History of Black Television (2023)
- Somebody's Gotta Do It (2014–16)
- This Is Life with Lisa Ling (2014–22)
- This Land (2026)
- Twitter: Breaking the Bird (2025)
- United Shades of America (2016–22)
- United States of Scandal (2025)
- The Wonder List with Bill Weir (2015–17; moved to CNN+ in 2022)
- Tony Shalhoub Breaking Bread (2025)

=== Special programming ===
- CNN Republican Town Hall with Donald Trump (May 11, 2023)
- AC 360° Weekend (2025–26)
- The Lead Weekend (2025–26)
- The Source Weekend (2025−26)

== See also ==
- CNN Films
