= List of daily evening American network TV news programs =

This is a listing of American television network programs currently airing or have aired during evening.

Evening news programming begins at 6:30pm, 5:30pm, or 3:30pm Eastern Time Zone/Pacific Time Zone, after network affiliates' late local news. On PBS, and cable television, news starts at 6:00 pm, earlier, or later ET/PT.

== Current ==
All times Eastern Time Zone/Pacific Time Zone—see effects of time on North American broadcasting for explanation.

Broadcast
Network	Program title	Duration	Days	Time	Current anchor(s)	Debut
ABC	ABC World News Tonight	30 minutes (with commercials)	Daily	6:30pm	David Muir (Weekdays); Whit Johnson (Saturdays); Linsey Davis (Sundays)	September 7, 1953 (Weekdays); July 5, 1975 (Weekends)
CBS	CBS Evening News	30 minutes (with commercials)	Daily	6:30pm	Tony Dokoupil (Weekdays); Jericka Duncan (Weekends)	July 1, 1941 (Weekdays); February 4, 1966 (Weekends)
NBC	NBC Nightly News	30 minutes (with commercials)	Daily	6:30pm	Tom Llamas (Weekdays); José Díaz-Balart (Saturdays); Hallie Jackson (Sundays)	August 3, 1970 (Weekdays); 1961 (Weekends)
PBS	PBS News Hour	60 minutes (weekday editions)	Daily	6:00pm	Amna Nawaz and Geoff Bennett	October 20, 1975
PBS	BBC World News America (Continues airing the program, despite leaving PBS on June 30, 2023)	30 minutes	Weekdays	5:00pm	Sumi Somaskanda, Caitriona Perry, Helena Humphrey, Carl Nasman	March 28, 2011 (KCET 28/Los Angeles and American Public Television); June 3, 2019 (official PBS program by an agreement with WETA 26/Washington, D.C.)
PBS	The Context	30 minutes	Weekdays	4:00pm	Christian Fraser	July 6, 2023
PBS	The World Today with Maryam Moshiri	30 minutes	Weekdays	2:00pm	Maryam Moshiri	February 21, 2024
PBS	PBS News: Horizons	30 minutes	Saturdays	2:00pm	William Brangham	January 17, 2026
PBS	PBS News: Compass Points	30 minutes	Sundays	2:00pm	Nick Schifrin	January 18, 2026
Telemundo	Noticias Telemundo (Spanish for Telemundo News)	30 minutes (with commercials)	Daily	6:30pm and 11:35pm	Julio Vaqueiro (Weekdays); Vanessa Hauc (Weekends)	N/A (Weekdays); September 8, 2001 (Weekends)
Univision	Noticiero N+ Univision (Spanish for N+ Univision News)	30 minutes (with commercials)	Daily	6:30pm and 11:35pm	Jorge Ramos (Weekdays); Ilia Calderón (Weekends)	June 1986
Cable/Satellite
BBC News (international feed)	BBC World News America	90 minutes	Weekdays	5:00pm ET/2:00pm PT & 6:00pm/3:00pm	Sumi Somaskanda, Caitriona Perry, Helena Humphrey, Carl Nasman	October 1, 2007
BBC News (international feed)	The Context with Christian Fraser	90 minutes	Weekdays	4:00pm ET/1:00pm PT	Christian Fraser	January 23, 2017
BBC News (international feed)	BBC News	90 minutes	Daily	7:00pm ET/4:00pm PT (30 minute programs on weekdays; six thirty-minute programs on weekdays)	Various	April 3, 2023
BBC News (international feed)	The World Today with Maryam Moshiri	90 minutes	Weekdays	2:00pm	Maryam Moshiri	February 21, 2024
BBC News (international feed)	Newsnight	90 minutes	Weekdays	5:30pm	Victoria Derbyshire(Monday-Wednesday); Paddy O'Connell(Thursday); Matt Chorley(Friday)	2025
BBC News (international feed)	Newsday with Steve Lai	90 minutes	Weekdays	9:00pm	Steve Lai	June 13, 2011
Bloomberg TV	Bloomberg Technology	N/A		6:00pm ET/3:00pm PT	N/A	
CNBC	Fast Money	30 minutes (Fridays with commercials); 60 minutes (Mon–Thurs with commercials)	Weekdays	5:00pm ET/2:00pm PT	Melissa Lee	June 21, 2006
CNBC	Mad Money	60 minutes (with commercials)	Weekdays	6:00pm ET/3:00pm PT	Jim Cramer	March 14, 2005
CNN	Erin Burnett OutFront	60 minutes (with commercials)	Weekdays	7:00pm ET/4:00pm PT	Erin Burnett	October 3, 2011
CNN	Anderson Cooper 360°	60 minutes (with commercials)	Weekdays	8:00pm ET/5:00pm PT	Anderson Cooper	September 8, 2003
CNN	The Source with Kaitlan Collins	60 minutes (with commercials)	Weekdays	9:00pm ET/6:00pm PT	Kaitlan Collins	July 10, 2023
CNN	CNN NewsNight	60 minutes (with commercials)	Weekdays	10:00pm ET/7:00pm PT	Abby Phillip	November 5, 2001 – November 4, 2005; October 16, 2023
CNN	Laura Coates Live	60 minutes (with commercials)	Weekdays	11:00pm ET/8:00pm PT	Laura Coates	October 16, 2023
CNN	The Story Is with Elex Michaelson	120 minutes (with commercials)	Weekdays (PT); Tue–Sat (ET)	12:00am ET/9:00 pm PT	Elex Michaelson	October 27, 2025
Fox News	The Story with Martha MacCallum	60 minutes (with commercials)	Weekdays	3:00pm ET/12:00pm PT	Martha MacCallum	January 9, 2017
Fox News	The Will Cain Show	60 minutes (with commercials)	Weekdays	4:00pm ET/1:00pm PT	Will Cain	January 21, 2025
Fox News	The Five	60 minutes (with commercials)	Weekdays	5:00pm ET/2:00pm PT (12:00am ET/9:00pm PT replay)	Greg Gutfeld, Dana Perino, Jesse Watters, Jeanine Pirro	July 11, 2011
Fox News	Special Report	60 minutes (with commercials)	Weekdays	6:00pm ET/3:00pm PT	Bret Baier	January 26, 1998
Fox News	The Ingraham Angle	60 minutes (with commercials)	Weekdays	7:00pm ET/4:00pm PT (repeated at 4:00am ET/11:00pm PT)	Laura Ingraham	October 30, 2017
Fox News	Jesse Watters Primetime	60 minutes (with commercials)	Weekdays	8:00pm ET/5:00pm (repeated at 1:00am ET/9:00pm PT)	Jesse Watters	January 24, 2022
Fox News	Hannity	60 minutes (with commercials)	Weekdays	9:00pm ET/6:00pm PT (repeated at 2:00am ET/10:00pm PT)	Sean Hannity	January 12, 2009
Fox News	Gutfeld!	60 minutes (with commercials)	Weekdays	10:00pm ET/7:00pm PT (repeated at 3:00am ET/11:00pm PT)	Greg Gutfeld	April 5, 2021
MS NOW	The Beat with Ari Melber	60 minutes (with commercials)	Weekdays	6:00pm ET/3:00pm PT	Ari Melber	July 24, 2017
MS NOW	The Weeknight	60 minutes (with commercials)	Weekdays	7:00pm ET/4:00pm PT	Alicia Menendez, Symone Sanders-Townsend and Michael Steele	May 5, 2025
MS NOW	The Rachel Maddow Show	60 minutes (with commercials)	Mondays	9:00pm ET/6:00pm PT	Rachel Maddow	September 8, 2008
MS NOW	All In with Chris Hayes	60 minutes (with commercials)	Tue–Fri	8:00pm ET/5:00pm PT	Chris Hayes	April 1, 2013
MS NOW	The Briefing with Jen Psaki	60 minutes (with commercials)	Tue–Fri	9:00pm ET/6:00pm PT	Jen Psaki	August 16, 2022
MS NOW	The Last Word with Lawrence O'Donnell	60 minutes (with commercials)	Weekdays	10:00pm ET/7:00pm PT	Lawrence O'Donnell (Monday-Thursday); Guest hosts (Friday)	September 27, 2010
MS NOW	The 11th Hour with Stephanie Ruhle	60 minutes (with commercials)	Weekdays	11:00pm ET/8:00pm PT	Stephanie Ruhle	September 6, 2016
NewsNation	Cuomo	60 minutes (with commercials)	Weekdays	8:00pm ET/5:00pm PT	Chris Cuomo	October 3, 2022
NewsNation	Katie Pavlich Tonight	60 minutes (with commercials)	Weekdays	10:00pm ET/7:00pm PT	Katie Pavlich	January 19, 2026
NewsNation	NewsNation Prime	120 minutes (with commercials)	Daily	8:00pm ET/5:00pm PT (Weekdays); 7:00pm/4:00pm PT (Weekends)	Marni Hughes (Weekdays); Rudabeh Shahbazi (Weekends)	September 1, 2020
NHK World-Japan	NHK Newsline	15-20 minutes (Weekdays) 10 minutes (Weekends and Holidays)	Daily	19:00 JST/10:00 UTC (Weekdays); 20:00 JST/11:00 UTC (Weekends and Holidays)	Raja Pradhan and Yoshi Ogasawara (Weekdays); Ross Mihara (Weekends)	April 3, 2000

== Former ==
=== Broadcast networks ===
==== NBC ====
- The Huntley–Brinkley Report (October 29, 1956 – July 31, 1970)
- Sunday Night with Megyn Kelly (June 4, 2017 – July 30, 2017)

==== PBS ====
- Nightly Business Report (January 21, 1979 – December 27, 2019; distributed by American Public Television)
- PBS News Weekend (September 7, 2013 – January 11, 2026)
- BBC OS (TV Only) (January 1, 2020 – March 30, 2023)
- BBC World News America (June 1, 2019 – June 30, 2023; but continues on most PBS and non-commercial independent stations after leaving PBS)

=== Cable networks ===
==== BBC News (international feed) ====
- BBC OS (TV Only) (February 16, 2014 – March 30, 2023)
- World News Today ( ?? – January 31, 2010; February 20, 2014 – March 30, 2020)

==== CNBC ====
- Bullseye (December 8, 2003 – March 11, 2005)
- Business Center (1997 – December 5, 2003)
- The News with Shepard Smith (September 30, 2020 – November 3, 2022)
- On the Money (October 3, 2005 – August 29, 2009)

==== CNN ====
- Who's Talking to Chris Wallace? (September 25, 2022 - November 15, 2024)
- CNN Tonight (November 30, 2009 – January 15, 2010; December 6, 2021 – October 6, 2023)
- Connie Chung Tonight (June 24, 2002 – March 2003)
- Cuomo Prime Time (August 28, 2017 – November 29, 2021; cancelled after Chris Cuomo's suspension on November 30, 2021, and then fired on December 4, 2021; then moved to NewsNation)
- Democracy in Peril (January 17, 2022 – January 28, 2022)
- King Charles (November 29, 2023 – April 10, 2024)
- Larry King Live (June 3, 1985 – December 16, 2010)
  - Piers Morgan Live (January 17, 2011 – March 28, 2014)
  - Don Lemon Tonight (April 14, 2014 – October 7, 2022; moved to CNN This Morning)
- John King, USA (March 22, 2010 – June 29, 2012)
- The Situation Room with Wolf Blitzer (August 8, 2005 – February 28, 2025; moved to the afternoon slot)
- Sports Tonight (June 1, 1980 – May 15, 2002)

==== Fox News ====
- The O'Reilly Factor (October 7, 1996 – April 21, 2017)
- Tucker Carlson Tonight (November 14, 2016 – April 21, 2023)
- Your World with Neil Cavuto (October 7, 1996 - January 17, 2025)

==== Fox Business ====
- Lou Dobbs Tonight (2011 – February 5, 2021; cancelled due to voting fraud for the 2020 United States Presidential Election)

==== MSNBC/MS NOW ====
- The ReidOut (July 20, 2020 – February 24, 2025)
- Alex Wagner Tonight (August 16, 2022 – January 17, 2025)

==== NewsNation ====
- Banfield (March 1, 2021 – January 16, 2026)

=== Local television ===
- KQED Newsroom (KQED 9/San Francisco; January 19, 1968 – June 23, 2023)
