= Don Lemon Tonight =

Weeknight television show on CNN

- Also known as: CNN Tonight with Don Lemon (2014–2021)
- Genre: News, interviews, commentary
- Presented by: Don Lemon
- Country of origin: United States
- Original language: English

Production
- Production locations: 30 Hudson Yards; New York City
- Running time: 120 minutes

Original release
- Network: CNN
- Release: May 17, 2021 – October 7, 2022

Related
- Piers Morgan Live; Erin Burnett OutFront Anderson Cooper 360°

Don Lemon Tonight (formerly CNN Tonight with Don Lemon) is a late evening news commentary program which aired from 2021 until its cancellation in 2022 on CNN, hosted by Don Lemon.

The program aired on weeknights live from 10:00 pm to midnight ET. Its two-hour timeslot was initially renamed CNN Tonight, without a host name in the title, with Laura Coates appearing in the first hour and Alisyn Camerota in the second, before their hosting hours were swapped, with Coates then dropped in March 2023, and Camerota hosting both hours. Since October 16, 2023, the timeslot has been taken by two separate shows, namely CNN NewsNight with Abby Phillip from 10:00 pm to 11:00 pm, followed by Laura Coates Live from 11:00 pm to 12 midnight.

== History ==
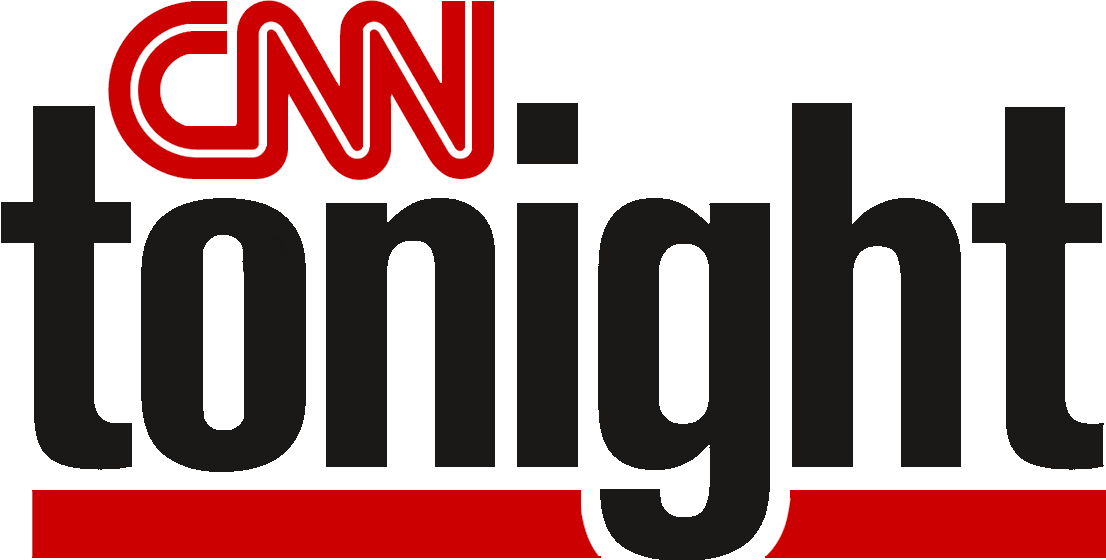
"CNN Tonight" logo used from April 14, 2014 to May 14, 2021

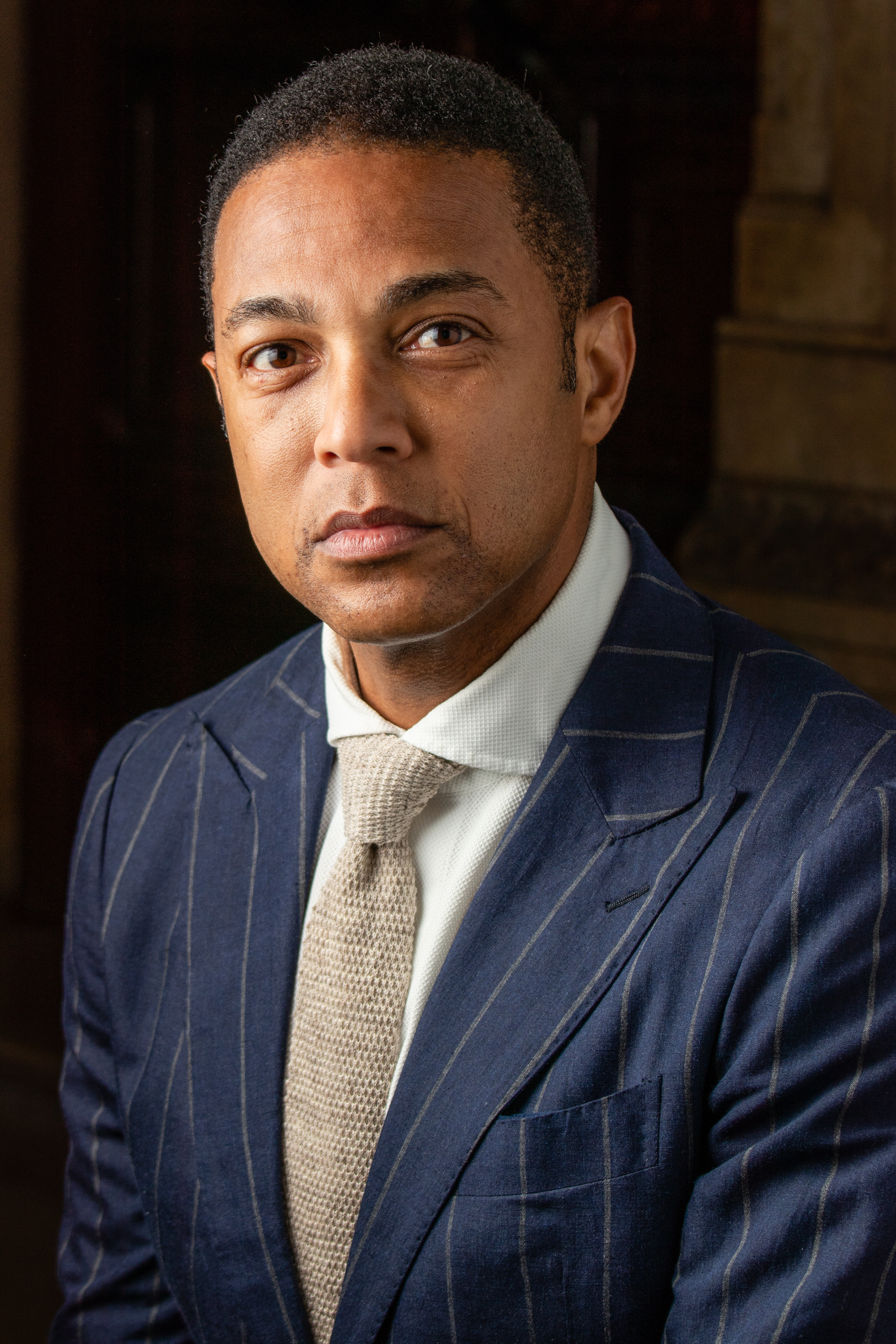
Don Lemon in 2018

CNN Tonight first premiered in April 2014, being introduced amid a revision to CNN's primetime schedule (including the replacement of the canceled Piers Morgan Live with CNN original series and specials in the 9 p.m. hour). The series was first promoted as featuring rotating anchors presenting "a live hour of the day’s biggest stories". The program would be initially hosted by Bill Weir using the former Piers Morgan Live studio.

The CNN Tonight title had previously been used for a short-lived program in 2001 anchored by Bill Hemmer, and a transitional program that temporarily filled the time slot of Lou Dobbs Tonight after Lou Dobbs' resignation from the network in November 2009 (the timeslot was later filled by The Situation Room after a realignment to CNN's daytime lineup, until its permanent replacement, John King, USA, premiered in March).

Don Lemon had been involved in pilot runs for several potential primetime shows, including The 11th Hour, and in March 2014, The Don Lemon Show, and a special nightly 10 p.m. program to provide additional analysis of the Malaysia Airlines Flight 370 disappearance. Lemon would later become permanent host of CNN Tonight, with it developing into more of a personality-based program.

On May 14, 2021, Lemon announced during that night's episode that it would be "the last night that we'll be CNN Tonight with Don Lemon", and teased a major change to the program on May 17. The following day, amid speculation by viewers that he was leaving CNN, Lemon revealed that the show was being renamed Don Lemon Tonight. He apologized for the confusion, saying that he "didn't mean to set the internet on fire".

On September 15, 2022, with Lemon having been named to the panel of CNN's forthcoming morning show CNN This Morning, it was announced that Don Lemon Tonight would conclude its run. Alisyn Camerota and Laura Coates were named as interim hosts for the timeslot.

Don Lemon Tonight aired for the final time on October 7, 2022; in his closing remarks, Lemon stated that it was a "bittersweet" moment, but didn't want to be "sad" about it, that "a lot happened between 10 and midnight, or later", and concluded the show by explaining that "sometimes it was exhausting because some of the things that we discuss here are so personal and so consuming. So, I hope I made you proud, and I thank you for tuning in all these years, and I hope that you're going to join me in the morning."
