= CNN Tonight =

American television news program

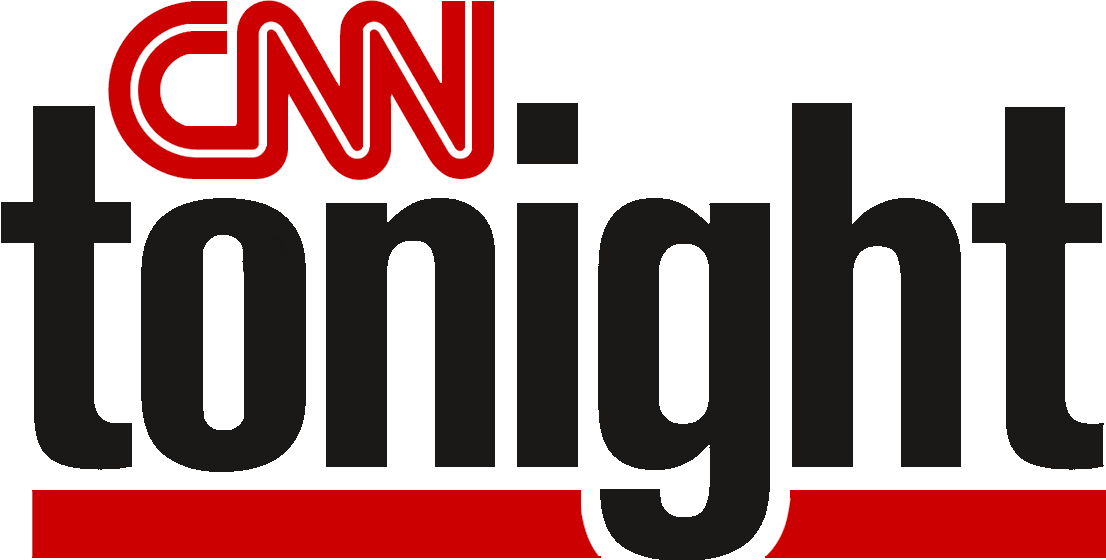
- Logo used since 2022
- Genre: News program
- Presented by: Alisyn Camerota
- Country of origin: United States
- Original language: English

Production
- Production locations: 30 Hudson Yards; New York City
- Camera setup: Multi-camera

Original release
- Network: CNN
- Release: November 30, 2009 – January 15, 2010
- Release: April 14, 2014 – May 14, 2021
- Release: December 6, 2021 – October 6, 2023

Related
- Erin Burnett OutFront; Anderson Cooper 360°

CNN Tonight is the title of several news programs that were broadcast by American cable network CNN. The CNN Tonight branding has primarily been used for transitional programs aired by CNN in the evening and prime time hours as part of changes to its programming lineup—including the departure (either voluntary or via termination) or reassignment of anchors. It was first used for a short-lived program in 2001 anchored by Bill Hemmer.

In November 2009, CNN Tonight temporarily replaced Lou Dobbs Tonight after Lou Dobbs' departure from the network. In April 2014, a third iteration premiered as a 10 p.m. ET program, as part of schedule changes following the cancellation of Piers Morgan Live; this iteration would later become a full-time program hosted by Don Lemon, and was renamed Don Lemon Tonight in May 2021.

In December 2021, the title was reinstated in the 9 p.m. hour after Chris Cuomo was fired from the network over allegations and evidence of sexual misconduct; the program replaced Cuomo Prime Time, and was produced by its staff. Don Lemon departed his program in October 2022 to move to CNN This Morning; on October 10, ahead of the 2022 midterm elections, Jake Tapper became an interim host of the 9 p.m. hour, and Don Lemon Tonight was replaced with hours of CNN Tonight hosted by Alisyn Camerota and Laura Coates.

In late-February 2023, the 9 p.m. hour was replaced with an anthology of special reports and interviews under the branding CNN Primetime. The hour's permanent replacement, The Source with Kaitlan Collins, premiered on July 10. In August 2023, CNN subsequently announced that Abby Phillip and Laura Coates would become permanent hosts of the 10 p.m. and 11 p.m. hours as CNN NewsNight with Abby Phillip and Laura Coates Live respectively.

== History ==
=== As a transitional replacement for Lou Dobbs Tonight ===
On November 11, 2009, Lou Dobbs abruptly announced his departure from CNN and Lou Dobbs Tonight to "pursue new opportunities". His departure came amid growing controversy over his promotion of Barack Obama citizenship conspiracy theories. CNN announced that Lou Dobbs Tonight would be replaced in the 7:00 p.m. ET hour by CNN Tonight, an interim program hosted by a rotation of anchors (which would include John Roberts, Erica Hill, and Tom Foreman), until the premiere of a new program hosted by CNN's chief national correspondent John King.

CNN Tonight ran until January 18, 2010, when The Situation Room was pushed into its timeslot by the premiere of Rick's List. Its permanent replacement, John King, USA, premiered on March 22, 2010.

=== As a transitional program in 2014, Don Lemon Tonight ===
On April 10, 2014, after the cancellation of Piers Morgan Live, CNN announced that it would begin to air CNN original series and documentaries in the 9:00 p.m. ET hour to replace Piers Morgan (as part of a larger push towards factual and reality content by new CNN head Jeff Zucker), and premiere the new program CNN Tonight at 10:00 p.m., which would feature "a live hour of the day's biggest stories". The hour had most recently been used for sporadic broadcasts of the Anderson Cooper 360° spin-off AC360° Later, pilot episodes of The Don Lemon Show, and special coverage of the disappearance of Malaysia Airlines Flight 370 hosted by Don Lemon.

CNN Tonight premiered on April 15, 2014, with Bill Weir anchoring from Boston to cover the one-year anniversary of the Boston Marathon bombing. It returned to CNN's studio the following night, with Weir presenting the program from the set formerly used by Piers Morgan Live (albeit using a store-bought office desk placed off to the side from its main desk and interview area). Don Lemon later became the permanent host of the hour, after which it evolved from a straight newscast to a personality-based program similar to CNN's other prime time shows. On May 17, 2021, the hour was renamed Don Lemon Tonight.

=== As a transitional replacement for Cuomo Prime Time (2021–2023) ===
On December 1, 2021, CNN received allegations and documentary evidence that Chris Cuomo—who had already been suspended indefinitely following reports that he assisted in the defense against the sexual harassment allegations that led to the resignation of his brother Andrew Cuomo as governor of New York—had engaged in sexual misconduct involving a former colleague, represented by attorney Debra Katz. She has since claimed that this allegation precipitated his firing from CNN.

On December 6, his show Cuomo Prime Time was cancelled and replaced with rotating anchors under the CNN Tonight branding, with Michael Smerconish hosting the first week of shows. The program was produced by the Cuomo Prime Time staff, and used a gold-tinted version of the graphics used by CNN Tonight and Don Lemon Tonight to differentiate it from Don Lemon's show. As of June 2022, the program had largely remained in third place among cable news channels in the 9 p.m. hour, behind MSNBC Prime (a retooling of The Rachel Maddow Show similarly featuring rotating anchors, after Maddow moved to a weekly schedule in May 2022 to accommodate other projects) and Fox News Channel's Hannity.

On September 22, 2022, ahead of the midterm elections and Don Lemon's upcoming move to CNN This Morning, it was announced that Jake Tapper would vacate his afternoon show The Lead and temporarily host CNN Tonight at 9:00 p.m., while Alisyn Camerota and Laura Coates would share a 10 p.m. hour of CNN Tonight to replace Lemon. Don Lemon Tonight aired its final episode on October 7, 2022. The premiere of CNN Tonight with Jake Tapper on October 10 featured interviews with Joe Biden and Dwayne Johnson; while still finishing third overall, it did see an improvement in average viewership over the hour in September 2022, and that night's edition finished second behind MSNBC's Alex Wagner Tonight in the 25-54 demographic.

In January 2023, it was announced that Camerota and Coates would host the 10 and 11 p.m. hours of CNN Tonight respectively. On February 3, 2023, CNN began to air Overtime, the post-show segment of HBO's Real Time with Bill Maher, as part of the 11:00 p.m. hour of CNN Tonight on Friday nights. On February 28, the 9:00 p.m. CNN Tonight was replaced by an anthology of various special reports, town halls, and interviews under the blanket branding CNN Primetime. By March 2023, Coates had been quietly dropped from the 11:00 p.m. hour, thus extending Camerota's program to two hours. Coates would then be named CNN's chief legal analyst in May 2023.

On May 17, 2023, CNN announced that Kaitlan Collins would host a new show in the 9 p.m. hour In early-July; The Source with Kaitlan Collins would premiere on July 10. On August 14, 2023, CNN announced permanent replacements for the 10 and 11 p.m. hours of CNN Tonight, with Abby Phillip hosting the new 10 p.m. show CNN NewsNight with Abby Phillip, and Coates becoming permanent host of the 11 p.m. hour as Laura Coates Live.

Preceded by The Source w/ Kaitlan Collins	CNN Tonight; 10:00 PM – 12:00 AM	Succeeded by Anderson Cooper 360° (replay) (Following First Airing)
Preceded by The Source w/ Kaitlan Collins	CNN Tonight; 10:00 PM – 12:00 AM	CNN Newsroom Live (Following Second Airing)
