= Cuomo Prime Time =

American editorial TV program

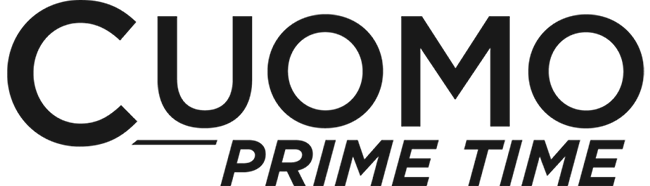
- Genre: News program
- Presented by: Chris Cuomo
- Country of origin: United States
- Original language: English

Production
- Executive producer: Melanie Buck
- Production locations: 30 Hudson Yards; New York City
- Camera setup: Multi-camera
- Running time: 60 minutes

Original release
- Network: CNN; CNN International
- Release: August 28, 2017 – August 31, 2017; January 9, 2018 – February 1, 2018; June 4, 2018 – November 29, 2021

Related
- Erin Burnett OutFront; Anderson Cooper 360° Don Lemon Tonight

Cuomo Prime Time is an American news analysis show that aired on CNN from August 28, 2017 to November 29, 2021. Hosted by Chris Cuomo, the series featured analysis and debates on current news topics, as well as in-depth interviews with notable figures.

The series was canceled by CNN in November 2021, after Cuomo was suspended indefinitely following reports that implied his impartiality was compromised because he assisted in the defense of his brother, former New York Governor Andrew Cuomo, against sexual harassment allegations that led to the Governor’s resignation. The hour was initially replaced by CNN Tonight, a transitional program produced by the Cuomo Prime Time staff with rotating anchors (not to be confused with Don Lemon Tonight, which previously used the title). The hour has subsequently been taken by The Source with Kaitlan Collins.

== History ==
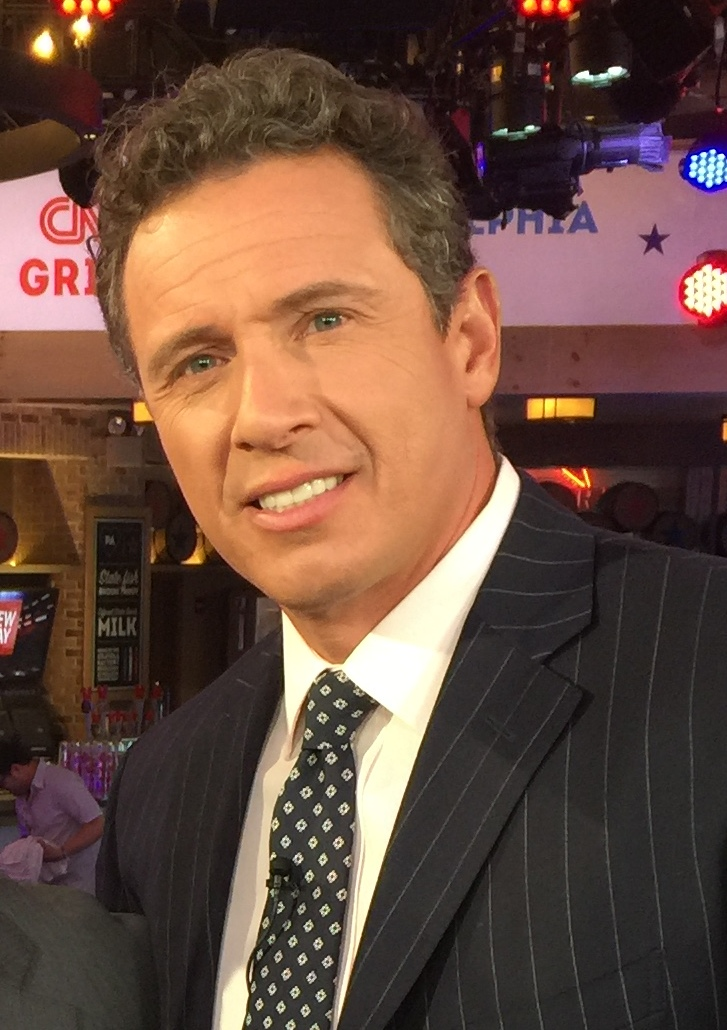
Host Chris Cuomo in 2016

Cuomo Prime Time was first broadcast for a week-long trial run in August 2017. A second, month-long run occurred in January 2018. before the program officially premiered on June 4, 2018.

A format established by Cuomo as one of two main co-hosts of the weekday edition of CNN's New Day, a three-hour morning news show, consists of an in-depth interview with a leading newsmaker (usually a senior public figure such as a politician, legal advocate or a celebrity in a public campaign), and it became an important part of Cuomo Prime Time during the show's two trial runs.

On the opening night, Cuomo interviewed White House Attorney Rudy Giuliani in the first One on One interview, and asked him to explain apparent discrepancies in the Trump Tower story. President Trump had contradicted earlier categorical and repeated assurances that he had no hand in drafting a statement about his son's presence at a meeting at Trump Tower in which a Russian intelligence operative was allegedly present. Giuliani said: "It was a mistake. I swear to God".

The show was the first major change to CNN's evening schedule for several years, which until the show's launch typically consisted of two hours each for the news analysis shows Anderson Cooper 360° (8 p.m. – 10 p.m. E.T.) and CNN Tonight with Don Lemon (10 p.m. – 12 midnight E.T.).

CNN's audience share has grown in recent years, but still lags behind that of Fox News and MSNBC during prime time. In the 25 to 54-year-old demographic, during February 2018, Fox News' Hannity averaged 711,000 viewers, MSNBC's The Rachel Maddow Show averaged 641,000, but Anderson Cooper 360° lagged behind at 386,000 average viewers. However, during its January trial run, Cuomo Prime Time tied with CNN's highest-rated show, Anderson Cooper 360°, among television viewers in the important 25-54 age ranges. But CNN's Executive Vice President of Programming, Michael Bass, argued that chasing ratings is much less important to CNN than establishing a viable new programming format, and that the change was needed because CNN sometimes airs non-live programs at 9pm E.T., such as documentaries and features, and instead "needs to be live" at a time when potentially important news stories are developing.

Cuomo Prime Time was scheduled to directly compete with Fox News' Hannity and MSNBC's The Rachel Maddow Show, which both consist of partisan political commentary from their respective presenters, in contrast to the analytical approach of CNN, in which a wide range of experts and political veterans with differing opinions are interviewed in large studio-based panel discussions. Cuomo said that he recognized that both Maddow and Hannity had high ratings: "They have huge numbers. I have huge respect for their success, and I take nothing away from them...But the point is, I don’t know where their partisan fights are getting us". Cuomo says that his interviews will feature newsmakers whom he will challenge if their statements are non-factual, and that his new show will encourage "debating with decency". He describes his approach as one where "You have to hold people to answer the questions. There is too much evasiveness, too much pandering, too much playing with the facts. You have to cut out the bias". He also says that "people are making the choice to be all in on one side. And unfortunately, while it's being done in the name of balance and in the name of truth, it's really just deepening the divide. That's feeding this move towards the tribal. I think that's a mistake".

Cuomo said that his new show would "not be tethered to the TV studio" and that he would travel more frequently for live broadcasts to the scenes of big breaking news. During a recent edition of The Axe Files podcast, host David Axelrod asked Cuomo about the title of Cuomo Prime Time, and he responded that none of the “trappings” of the program matter to him and that during the January 2018 [second] trial run, he "wore the same suit every night for a month".

=== Andrew Cuomo defense and firing from CNN ===
On November 30, 2021, Cuomo was suspended indefinitely by CNN, following reports that he assisted in the defense against the sexual harassment allegations that led to the resignation of his brother, former New York Governor Andrew Cuomo. Cuomo Prime Time would be temporarily replaced by an additional hour of Anderson Cooper 360° for the remainder of the week, and it had been reported that Michael Smerconish (who has filled in for Cuomo in the past) would guest host Cuomo Prime Time beginning December 6.

On December 1, 2021, CNN received additional allegations that Chris had engaged in sexual misconduct involving an anonymous former colleague, represented by attorney Debra Katz. She has since claimed that this allegation precipitated his firing from CNN. On December 6, Cuomo Prime Time was replaced with a transitional program produced by the Cuomo Prime Time staff under the CNN Tonight, later CNN PrimeTime branding, anchored by rotating personalities (with Smerconish hosting the first week of shows). It lasted until May 2023, when CNN announced that Kaitlan Collins would become the network's new 9 p.m. host, with her show The Source with Kaitlan Collins premiering on July 10, 2023.

== Format ==
The show opened with a run-down of several program segments and the naming of guests. The segments consisted of the following:

- Opening Statement — Cuomo on most kickoff segments would talk about the recent news, and combines them with his own opinions in a speech;
- One on One — As the title implies, an in-depth interview with a single guest. There would sometimes be more than one of this segment per show;
- The Great Debate — Two guests argue over opposing viewpoints of a contentious issue, where unproven or untruthful statements are challenged;
- @The Whiteboard — A point-by-point overview of a top news story, with Cuomo drawing on a vertical whiteboard to highlight key points and connections between them
- Cuomo's Court
- Closing Argument

== Ratings ==
In the first week of the presidency of Joe Biden, the show had a drop in viewers and a ratings decline with over 5 million total viewers at the beginning of January 2021 to 2.1 million on the last week of the month. In the key 25-54 demo, Cuomo Prime Time had their audience cut in half with fewer than half a million total viewers. Despite this, Cuomo Prime Time was reported as CNN's most watched program in January 2021 as well. The show was also reported as having more viewership than any other cable news program in the 25–54 demo during the first of quarter of 2021 as well, gaining both 66% in total viewers and 50% in the demo, compared to the first quarter of 2020.

During the early August 2021 time frame, just before his brother, New York Governor Andrew Cuomo, announced his resignation from office, the show did not break the million viewer mark for the fifth straight week, scoring 856,000 viewers, with 192,000 viewers in the 25–54 demographic group. Nevertheless, Cuomo Prime Time still remained one of CNN's most watched shows and Variety reported that CNN still supported Chris Cuomo despite the scandal.

Preceded by Anderson Cooper 360º	CNN Weekday lineup 9:00 pm – 10:00 pm 1:00 am – 2:00 am (replay)	Succeeded by Don Lemon Tonight
