= Gerri Willis =

American journalist

- Born: August 14, 1959 (age 67); Spruce Pine, North Carolina, U.S.
- Education: Miami University
- Occupations: Journalist, news anchor
- Employer: Fox Entertainment Group
- Spouse: David Evans (m. 1994)

Gerri Willis is an American television news journalist and former host of The Willis Report, a daytime program on Fox Business, focusing on consumer and personal finance issues.

== Early life and education ==
Gerri Willis was born on August 14, 1959, in Spruce Pine, North Carolina. She is a graduate of Columbia Business School and Miami University located in Oxford, Ohio where she was a Knight-Bagehot Fellow.

== Career ==
Prior to joining Fox Business, Willis served as the personal finance editor for CNN, hosting a weekly half-hour program titled Your Bottom Line, which focused on ways to save Americans money and the economy's effects on personal finance. Before CNN, she worked at Smart Money magazine as the senior financial correspondent. She joined the Fox Business Network in March 2010, appearing across all programming on the network. Willis is the author of two business books, The Smart Money Guide to Real Estate Investing and Home Rich. She was also the winner of the Excellence in Retirement Savings Reporting award in 2001, which is bestowed by the American University School of Communication and the Investment Company Institute's Education Foundation.

== Personal life ==
Willis married David Evans in 1994. In May 2016, Willis announced her breast cancer diagnosis after discovering an abnormality and seeing her physician in April. Nearly a year later, she indicated that dealing with the cancer has been a blessing, and has reconnected her with her faith. By October 2017, she had undergone a mastectomy, four months of chemotherapy, and five weeks of daily radiation treatment. In an interview with Westchester Magazine that same month, she announced she had been in remission since the start of the year. On January 28, 2020, it was announced that Willis would take a leave of absence as she undergoes surgery to address pre-cancer cells.
