= The Mongoose (film) =

2026 film by Mark Vanselow

- Theatrical release poster
- Directed by: Mark Vanselow
- Written by: Thompson Evans
- Produced by: Al Corley; Eugene Musso; Bart Rosenblatt
- Starring: Liam Neeson; Marisa Tomei; Ving Rhames; Marcus Thomas; Nick Mitchell; Maurice Marvel Meredith; Michael Chiklis
- Cinematography: Tom Stern
- Edited by: Rodrigo Balart
- Music by: Michael Yezerski
- Production companies: Code Entertainment; Jupiter Peak Productions
- Distributed by: Samuel Goldwyn Films (United States); Amazon MGM Studios (Australia; through Prime Video)
- Release dates: October 30, 2026 (United States); November 4, 2026 (Australia)
- Running time: 99 minutes
- Countries: United States; Australia
- Language: English
- Budget: $20 million
- Box office: $1.1 million

The Mongoose is a 2026 action thriller film written by Thompson Evans, directed by Mark Vanselow in his directorial debut and starring Liam Neeson, Marisa Tomei, Ving Rhames, and Michael Chiklis.

The Mongoose was released in the United States on October 30, 2026.

== Plot ==
During the US war in Afghanistan, Green Beret Ryan "Fang" Flanagan and his squad, consisting of Munch, Tanker and Wiz, are captured and held prisoner by the Taliban. Flanagan manages to escape and free his squad mates but Wiz dies before they are rescued. Flanagan is celebrated as a war hero but his experience in captivity leads to his marriage with his wife Tara breaking down.

Years later, during a dinner with Munch and Tanker to commemorate Wiz's death, Flanagan receives a call from Tara in hospital. She asks him to retrieve personal items from her abusive boyfriend Todd, a rich Louisville lawyer. Flanagan sneaks into Todd's house but is found and confronted by him. Todd accidentally shoots Flanagan in the leg, leading him to fight back in self-defence after he has a PTSD episode. In the struggle, they tumble off a balcony and Todd dies from a head injury. Told that the police had already been called and unwilling to become a prisoner again, Flanagan steals a Shelby Mustang from Todd's garage and flees.

Flanagan leads police on a chase through Kentucky, using the car's AI assistant to plot a course to Texas. CNN reporter Laura Coates gets in contact with Flanagan, bringing greater attention to his plight from the public. Tanker and Munch steal a helicopter to aid Flanagan, while Texas Highway Patrol Major Walter Pope becomes adamant on stopping Flanagan at any cost.

With the help of sympathetic veterans and members of the public, Flanagan continues his journey into Texas and plans to make his way to The Mongoose, a beachside bar in Mexico where Tara has agreed to reunite with him should he manage to escape the police. When Flanagan is cornered near the border, Tanker and Munch again come to his aid, using their helicopter to rescue him from the car before he drives it off a pier. Frustrated, Pope calls in the Air National Guard, but the pilot refuses to shoot down their helicopter. The squad mates fly on to Mexico.

== Cast ==
- Liam Neeson as Ryan "Fang" Flanagan
- Marisa Tomei as Tara, Flanagan's ex-wife
- Marcus Thomas as Munch, Flanagan's former teammate
- Ving Rhames as Tanker, Flanagan's former teammate
- Michael Chiklis as Major Walter Pope, from Texas Highway Patrol
- Maurice Marvel Meredith as James Tilton, a Kentucky Policeman
- Laura Coates as herself
- Brett Tucker as Todd, estranged new love interest of Flanagan's ex-wife

== Production ==
In May 2024, it was announced that Liam Neeson was cast in the film. In February 2025, it was announced that Marisa Tomei, Ving Rhames and Michael Chiklis were cast in the film and that filming began in the Australian state of Victoria. The film was shot in Bacchus Marsh, Castlemaine, Templestowe, Bangholme, Frankston, the Melbourne CBD, North Melbourne, Kensington, Greenvale, Travancore, Altona and Moorabbin.

== Release ==
In May 2026, Samuel Goldwyn Films acquired the U.S. distribution rights to the film. The Mongoose was released in the United States on October 30, 2026. In May 2024, Amazon MGM Studios acquired distribution rights to the film for most international territories at the Marché du Film in a deal estimated around $20 million, releasing it on Prime Video on November 4, 2026.

== Reception ==
On the review aggregator website Rotten Tomatoes, 38% of 29 critics' reviews are positive, with an average rating of 5.0/10.

Glenn Kenny of RogerEbert.com praised the film's action and direction but criticized its screenplay's "dialogue infelicities." Multiple film critics compared The Mongoose to 1970s action movies like Smokey and the Bandit.
