= Your Bottom Line =

- Genre: Personal finance
- Starring: Gerri Willis
- Country of origin: United States
- Original language: English

Production
- Production locations: Atlanta, Georgia

Original release
- Network: CNN
- Release: 2009 – 2010

Related
- Your Money

Your Bottom Line is a CNN news program focusing on financial news hosted by Christine Romans. The program was hosted by Gerri Willis before her departure from CNN in February 2010. She later moved to Fox Business in March 2010 The show aired Saturdays at 9:30am on CNN. Originally called Open House, the program was designed to show how the political and economic news of the week affects a viewer's bottom line. The topics discussed on Your Bottom Line shifted from a narrow real estate focus to a broader discussion of personal finance, from houses to cars, from personal debt to bank accounts. The stated goal of Your Bottom Line was to give viewers information so that they can save as much money as possible.
