= The Source with Kaitlan Collins =

- Genre: News
- Presented by: Kaitlan Collins

Production
- Production locations: CNN Studios, Washington, D.C.
- Camera setup: Multi-camera
- Running time: 60 minutes

Original release
- Network: CNN; CNN International
- Release: July 10, 2023 – present

Related
- Erin Burnett OutFront; Anderson Cooper 360°; CNN NewsNight with Abby Phillip; Laura Coates Live

The Source with Kaitlan Collins is an American news discussion show broadcast by CNN and CNN International. Premiering on July 10, 2023, the program is hosted by CNN's chief White House correspondent Kaitlan Collins from its Washington, D.C., bureau. Substitute hosts of the program are chief national security correspondent Jim Sciutto, The Story Is anchor Elex Michaelson, and The Arena host Kasie Hunt.

== History ==
On November 30, 2021, CNN suspended Chris Cuomo and his 9 p.m. program Cuomo Prime Time indefinitely after it was reported that Cuomo had helped defend the sexual harassment allegations against his brother and former Governor of New York Andrew Cuomo. After it was reported that Chris had also faced his own allegations of sexual misconduct, he was fired from the network. Cuomo's program was replaced with an hour of CNN Tonight produced by the Cuomo Prime Time staff, and later a rotation of various specials and documentaries.

On May 17, 2023, it was announced that Kaitlan Collins would leave CNN This Morning to anchor a new 9 p.m. program beginning in June 2023. In July 2023, the new show's title was revealed as The Source with Kaitlan Collins, and was set for a premiere on July 10, 2023. CNN billed that the program would "expose uncovered angles and challenge conventional wisdom to make sure viewers are seeing a story from every side".

In May 2025, The Source underwent a retool of its on-air presentation, relocating from a traditional studio setting to a set in CNN's Washington newsroom, and being rebranded with a black and gold-themed logo and graphics. Collins described the retool as being less "glossy" and more reflective of her current position as the network's chief White House correspondent, explaining that the newsroom is "not a very chill place", and was a "natural setting" for a program based on reporting from the White House. Likewise, CNN president Mark Thompson explained that the retool would present Collins as a "hard-working reporter who's determined to stay close to the action."

Preceded by Anderson Cooper 360°	CNN Weekday lineup 9:00 pm – 10:00 pm	Succeeded by CNN NewsNight with Abby Phillip
