= Alisyn Camerota =

American journalist (born 1966)

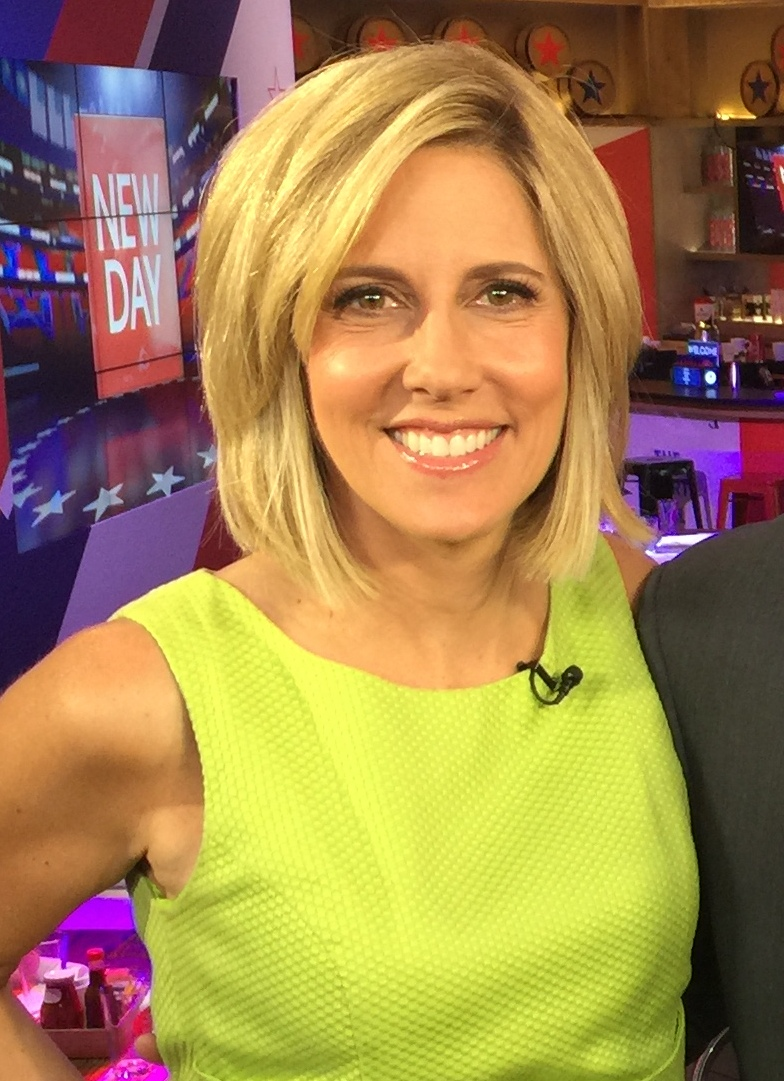
- Camerota in 2016
- Born: Alisyn Lane Camerota; June 21, 1966 (age 60); Shrewsbury, New Jersey, U.S.
- Education: American University
- Occupation: Broadcast journalist
- Employers: Fox News (1998–2014); CNN (2014–2024)
- Spouse: Tim Lewis (m. 2001; died 2024)
- Children: 3

Alisyn Lane Camerota (born June 21, 1966) is an American broadcast journalist and political commentator for Scripps News. She was formerly an anchor of CNN's morning show New Day, co-host of the afternoon edition of CNN Newsroom, and host of CNN Tonight from 2022 to 2023. Prior to CNN, she was a host at Fox News. Camerota has covered stories nationally and internationally and has twice been nominated for an Emmy Award for news reporting.

Camerota covered the aftermath of Hurricane Harvey in Houston, the Paris and Brussels terror attacks and the Parkland school shooting. She interviewed the Parkland student survivors and representatives of the National Rifle Association of America in the hours after the shooting. Camerota has held dozens of panels with Donald Trump supporters. She covered the Me Too movement. Outside of her role anchoring New Day, Camerota anchored a number of primetime specials, including Tipping Point: Sexual Harassment in America and The Hunting Ground: Sexual Assault on Campus. At Fox News, she was notably a part of the Fox & Friends franchise and as co-host of Fox & Friends Weekend.

Her first novel, Amanda Wakes Up, about an idealistic young journalist who finds herself with a plum spot at a cable news channel during a crazy presidential race was published by Viking in 2017 and was selected by NPR as one of the best books of the year, and by O, The Oprah Magazine as "a must read."

== Early life and education ==
Camerota is a native of Shrewsbury, New Jersey. She graduated from the School of Communication of the American University in Washington, D.C., with a degree in broadcast journalism.

== Career ==
=== Early broadcasting career ===
Before joining Fox, Camerota worked at a number of different stations, including WHDH in Boston and WTTG in Washington D.C., and for America's Most Wanted. She also worked on Ted Koppel's primetime documentaries at Koppel Communications.

=== Fox News ===
Camerota joined the network in February 1998 as a correspondent for its Boston bureau, reporting on a number of different stories and contributing to the network's affiliate service, Fox News Edge.

In October 2007, Camerota started a blog on the Fox & Friends page on Fox News Channel's website called In The Greenroom. In November 2007, Fox & Friends began an Internet-only segment, "The After the Show Show", which featured Fox & Friends anchors Brian Kilmeade, Steve Doocy and Gretchen Carlson, sometimes along with earlier guests or crew members from the cable show and a toy monkey at the end of the Internet segment. These videos are available later on the Fox & Friends page on Fox News Channel's website. Camerota was a co-host of the weekend edition of this program, in addition to regularly appearing on the Friday edition of Fox & Friends 1st.

Camerota began co-hosting America's News Headquarters with Bill Hemmer on September 30, 2013, in the Monday to Friday 1:00 p.m. - 2:00 p.m. ET time slot. She also co-hosted Fox & Friends Weekend along with Clayton Morris and Dave Briggs. Her final broadcast on that program was September 28, 2013. She was also a co-host on Fox & Friends First.

At the end of the afternoon broadcast on March 14, 2014, Camerota marked the end of her 16-year run with the network in a farewell to her afternoon audience.

Camerota states that she was sexually harassed by Fox News chairman and CEO Roger Ailes. She is briefly portrayed by Tricia Helfer in the movie Bombshell.

=== CNN ===
On July 14, 2014, CNN and CNN International announced that Camerota had joined the CNN news team to serve as a TV anchor with a time slot to be announced. She co-anchored on CNN's New Day the morning of Friday, July 25, 2014, and Monday, August 25, 2014, and in 2015 became a permanent co-anchor of New Day, whose viewership reportedly increased by 9 percent after she was added to the program.

On Monday, April 19, 2021, Camerota began co-hosting CNN Newsroom from 2-4 pm with Victor Blackwell.

In September 2022, Camerota was selected to serve as an interim host of CNN Tonight along with Jake Tapper and Laura Coates throughout the 2022 midterm elections where she helmed the 10 p.m. hour.

In January 2023 she was selected to permanently host the 11 p.m. hour of CNN Tonight. In August 2023 CNN announced that Camerota would be replaced by Laura Coates in the 11 p.m. ET hour following a major overhaul in weekday/weekend programming.

On December 8, 2024, Camerota announced she was departing CNN after 10 years on the network. She announced her exit on Instagram, saying, "Big News, Everyone! Today is my last day on CNN." On air, she thanked the CNN staff and said she has plans for the future.

=== Amanda Wakes Up ===
Camerota wrote Amanda Wakes Up, a novel she began writing while taking notes of her interviews of candidates in the 2012 presidential election. The notes developed into a novel based on her 25 years of working for the news business. She wrote the book with the desire to remind readers of the importance of real journalism. Book reviewer Lincee Ray of the Associated Press wrote that the novel offers "a healthy dose of what it means to weigh ambition against truth".

== Personal life ==
Camerota is of Italian American heritage. A native of Shrewsbury, New Jersey, she and her husband had fraternal twin daughters conceived via in-vitro fertilization in 2005 and a son who was conceived naturally in 2007. In 2010, she appeared on The Today Show to discuss her infertility issues and served as host of the National Infertility Associations "Night of Hope Celebration".

Camerota revealed in an Instagram post that her husband, Tim Lewis, died after a two-year battle with stage 4 pancreatic cancer on July 27, 2024. The couple lived in Westport, Connecticut.

== See also ==
- New Yorkers in journalism
