= Laura Coates Live =

- Genre: News
- Presented by: Laura Coates
- Country of origin: United States

Production
- Production location: CNN Studios Washington, D.C.
- Camera setup: Multi-camera
- Running time: 60 minutes

Original release
- Network: CNN; CNN International
- Release: October 16, 2023 – present

Related
- Larry King Live; Erin Burnett OutFront; Anderson Cooper 360°; The Source with Kaitlan Collins; CNN NewsNight with Abby Phillip

Laura Coates Live is an American news discussion show broadcast by CNN and CNN International. Premiering on October 16, 2023, the program is hosted by CNN's chief legal analyst Laura Coates. The show currently airs weeknights live from 11:00 pm to midnight ET.

If Laura Coates is unavailable, the earlier program CNN NewsNight with Abby Philip will be extended to 2 hours, pre-empting this show. Laura Coates Live is also available as a podcast to listen to, like Spotify or Apple Podcasts.

== History ==
Amid the lead-up to the 2022 midterm elections and Don Lemon's move to CNN This Morning, CNN announced in September 2022 that Laura Coates and Alisyn Camerota would co-anchor the 10 p.m.–midnight ET block of CNN Tonight beginning in October 2022, replacing Don Lemon Tonight. In January 2023, Camerota and Coates were named as interim hosts of the 10 and 11 p.m. hours. Coates would depart CNN Tonight in March 2023, and was subsequently promoted to chief legal analyst in May 2023.

On August 14, 2023, CNN announced that Coates would return to the 11 p.m. hour to host a new program, Laura Coates Live, which premiered on October 16, 2023.

Coates told the Los Angeles Times that Laura Coates Live would be a "renaissance and rejuvenation" of CNN's former talk show Larry King Live, explaining that "I always loved the intimate Larry King experience, where the viewers feel like they are in the room where it's happening. I am a conduit to the questions they want asked. It will have a late-night vibe." While Laura Coates Live has adopted visual elements inspired by Larry King Live (such as graphics evoking the program's trademark world map backdrops), it otherwise uses a format similar to CNN's other primetime programs, and is not formatted as a straight talk show.

Preceded by CNN NewsNight with Abby Phillip	CNN Weekday lineup 11:00 pm – 12:00 am	Succeeded by The Story Is with Elex Michaelson
