= Lou Dobbs Tonight =

American TV program

- Presented by: Lou Dobbs
- Country of origin: United States

Production
- Running time: 60 minutes

Original release
- Network: CNN
- Release: June 1, 1980 – November 11, 2009
- Network: Fox Business Network
- Release: March 14, 2011 – February 5, 2021
- Network: Lindell TV
- Release: January 8 – July 18, 2024

Related
- John King, USA CNN

Lou Dobbs Tonight is an American political and financial talk program that was hosted by Lou Dobbs. It originally aired from June 1, 1980, to November 11, 2009. It was subsequently relaunched from March 14, 2011, to February 5, 2021, and again from January 8, 2024, to July 18, 2024, the date of Dobbs' death.

The program initially aired on CNN from its launch under the title Moneyline, as its main financial news program. The program later shifted to an opinion-based format focusing on political and economic commentary, and was likewise renamed Lou Dobbs Tonight. Field correspondents provided additional reporting and occasionally served as guest anchors. During Dobbs' tenure, prominent politicians and economists were regular guests on the show.

On November 11, 2009, Lou Dobbs stepped down from CNN. On March 14, 2011, Dobbs moved to Fox Business and hosted a new incarnation of Lou Dobbs Tonight. On February 5, 2021, Fox Business canceled Lou Dobbs Tonight after nearly 10 years on the channel after a defamation lawsuit was filed against Fox News by Smartmatic, a voting machine vendor, over statements made by Dobbs and other Fox Business and Fox News anchors.

In January 2024, the program resumed airing as a streaming show on Lindell TV/FrankSpeech. Lou Dobbs died in July 2024.

== History ==
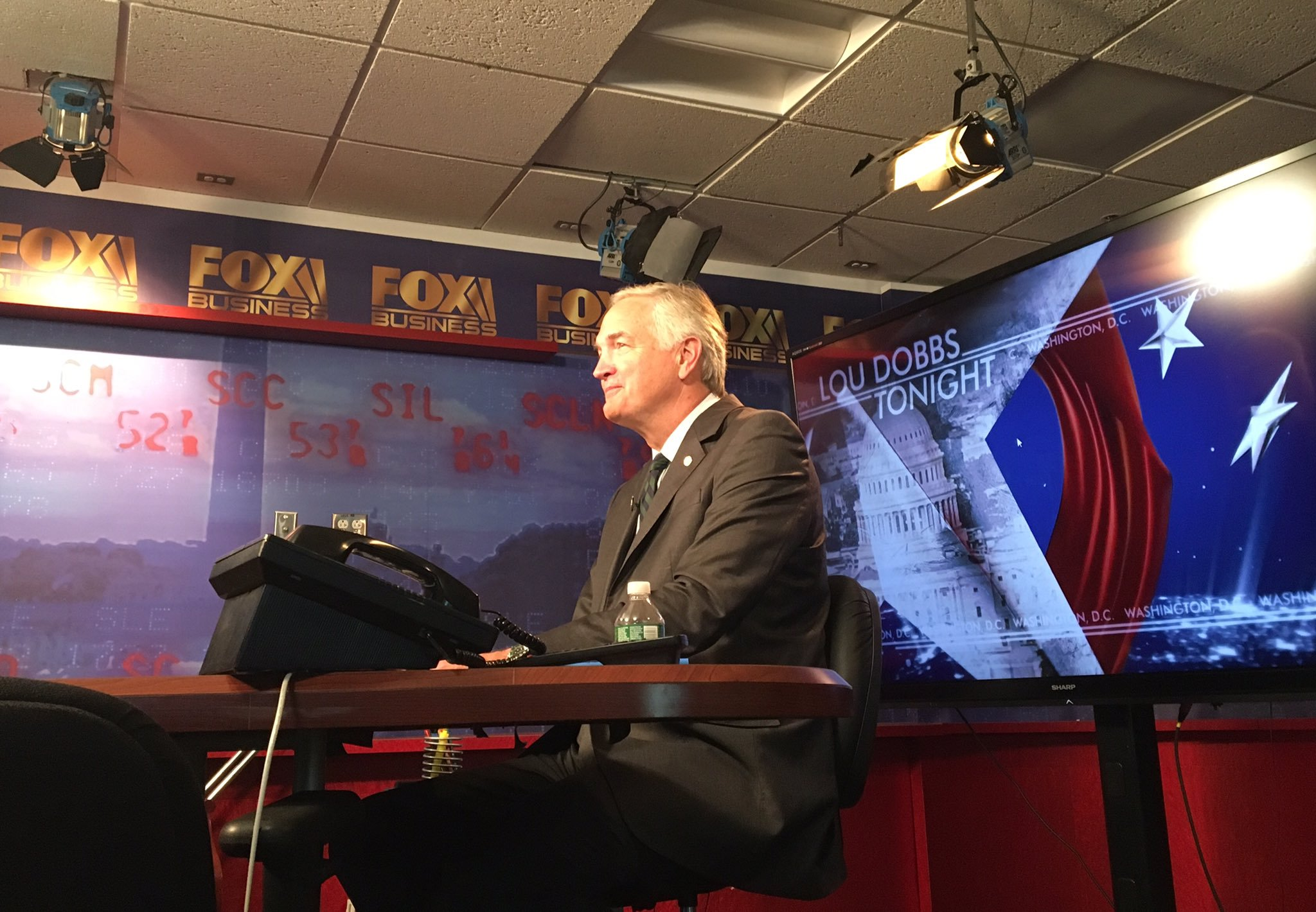
Luther Strange on Lou Dobbs Tonight in May 2017

=== CNN era ===
Lou Dobbs Tonight began with the name Moneyline with the premiere of CNN and was CNN's main financial show for over 20 years. For a large portion of those years, it aired on CNN International as well.

In late 1997, Dobbs hired former ABC News and NBC News executive producer David Bohrman to turn the program into a more general evening newscast, which would be called The Moneyline NewsHour. The program was half financially focused and half general news. It was the first regular program at CNN to have its main control room outside of Atlanta.

As the show moved more towards general news and economic and political commentary, it was renamed Lou Dobbs Moneyline and then Lou Dobbs Tonight. The show was among CNN's most watched.

On November 4, 2006, a taped weekend edition of Lou Dobbs Tonight, entitled Lou Dobbs This Week, began airing. The weekend show, which aired every Saturday and Sunday night, discussed issues from the past week and the week ahead.

On November 11, 2009, Lou Dobbs left the network, telling viewers that the night's episode of Lou Dobbs Tonight was his last. Further, he said, "Some leaders in media, politics and business have been urging me to go beyond the role here at CNN". Although he had a contract with CNN until the end of 2011, CNN agreed to release him early. It was announced that John King would host a new program in the time slot and that the transitional program CNN Tonight (initially hosted by John Roberts) would replace Lou Dobbs Tonight in the meantime. John King's new program, John King, USA, debuted in Lou Dobbs' time slot on March 22, 2010.

=== Fox Business era ===
On November 10, 2010, Fox Business Network announced that Dobbs would join the channel. On March 3, 2011, it was announced that Dobbs' program would premiere on March 14, and that it would also be known as Lou Dobbs Tonight. The program became the network's highest-rated series, especially during the first presidency of Donald Trump—whom Dobbs regularly supported on-air.

On January 4, 2021, Dobbs stated on air that "everyone knows" crimes were committed in the election process in several states, but he went on to state that "...we still don't have verifiable, tangible support" for those alleged crimes. He added that "...we have had a devil of a time finding actual proof." On February 5, 2021, Fox Business abruptly cancelled Lou Dobbs Tonight. Dobbs was one of several anchors that had been named in a defamation lawsuit against Fox News by voting machine vendor Smartmatic, which accused the parties of spreading conspiracy theories alleging that it was responsible for voter fraud during the 2020 presidential election. The program was replaced in its time slot by Fox Business Tonight, which is hosted by various Fox Business anchors.

== Regular features ==
One regular feature on the show was "Exporting America", in which Dobbs documented American companies that outsourced jobs to overseas facilities, as well as those businesses that took special steps to keep jobs on U.S. soil. He compiled a list of companies that had outsourced, and he posted it on the show's website and occasionally repeated it on the air. Dobbs frequently criticized U.S. international trade policy, saying that it insufficiently protected American jobs, and advocated what many consider economic protectionism in contrast to free trade. As part of his criticism of globalization, he often noted that the United States runs trade deficits with virtually every major trading partner it has, especially China. The journalist also published a book titled Exporting America: Why Corporate Greed Is Shipping American Jobs Overseas, detailing the individuals and interests behind exporting U.S. jobs overseas.

Another regular feature was "Broken Borders", which highlighted what Dobbs considered to be the problems and costs associated with illegal immigrants and the inefficiencies in the U.S. Border Patrol and immigration policies in general. Dobbs has remained consistent on this view on the Fox Business Network as well.

== Correspondents and production ==
Kitty Pilgrim was a correspondent for the CNN version of the program and the most frequent substitute anchor when Dobbs was not on. Other reporters attached to CNN's Lou Dobbs Tonight included Dana Bash, Lisa Sylvester, and Suzanne Malveaux. The show was broadcast live from CNN's New York studios, located in the Time Warner Center. The Fox Business version of the program originated from Studio B at the News Corp. Building, then towards the end, from a home studio on Dobbs' farm in Wantage Township in Sussex County, New Jersey.

== Ratings ==
The program's highest-rated show in 2008 was the day after the presidential election—two million viewers, according to Nielsen Media Research data. At Fox Business, the show maintained a multi-year lead as the top business program in its time slot and overall on television.
