= Piers Morgan Live =

American talk show

- Also known as: Piers Morgan Tonight (2011–2013)
- Genre: Talk show
- Created by: Piers Morgan
- Presented by: Piers Morgan
- Country of origin: United States
- No. of seasons: 3

Production
- Running time: 41 minutes

Original release
- Network: CNN
- Release: January 17, 2011 – March 28, 2014

Related
- Larry King Live; Don Lemon Tonight

Piers Morgan Live (formerly known as Piers Morgan Tonight) is an American television talk show, hosted by Piers Morgan and broadcast on CNN. The show premiered on January 17, 2011, and filled in the former Larry King Live timeslot. It was announced as cancelled on February 23, 2014, after a continuous drop in ratings, and broadcast its last episode on March 28, 2014.

The theme music was written by Anthony James, composer and CEO of British company Music Candy, and his writing partner Yiorgos Bellapaisiotis, Music Candy's Director. Piers Morgan Live was broadcast primarily from CNN's studios at the Time Warner Center in New York City.

== Format ==
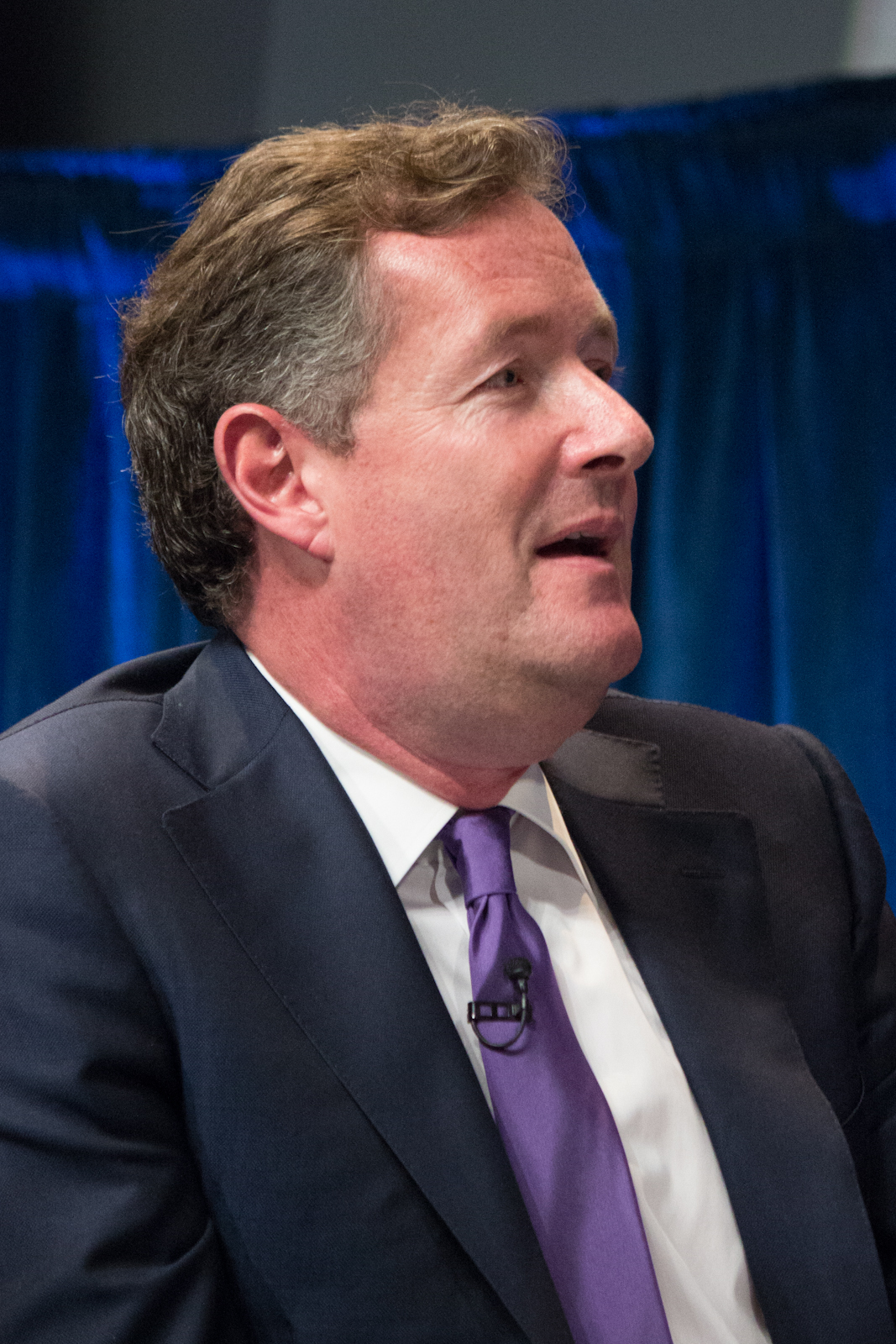
Morgan in 2013

Throughout the show's run, Morgan interviewed many guests. His first guest was Oprah Winfrey. Soon after the show's debut, when the Egyptian revolution began, the show changed from a Larry King Live-like interview format to a breaking news-format program. Morgan had never anchored a live news show, but did have experience with breaking news as a newspaper journalist. Because of major news events, such as Arab Spring of 2010s and the Great East Japan earthquake, tsunami, and nuclear disaster, the ratio of taped to live interviews was the opposite of his expectations.

== Ratings ==
After a respectable start on the debut show, Piers Morgan Tonight had suffered from falling ratings. On his first show 2.1 million U.S. viewers tuned in, but by the second show the ratings dropped to 1.3 million. The January 28, 2011, edition garnered just 498,000 viewers. The show received its second largest audience on February 28, 2011, as 1.346 million people tuned in to see Morgan interview actor Charlie Sheen, whose recent abnormal behavior made headlines. However, by the autumn of 2011, the program's ratings were trending downward. In October 2011, Piers Morgan Tonight had an average total audience of 589,000 each night, down from Larry King Live's average of 657,000 in the same month a year before. In November 2011, the program had an average of just 154,000 viewers ages 25 to 54. In contrast, Larry King Live had an average of 161,000 in November 2010. Piers Morgan Tonight also had fewer total viewers that month than Larry King Live did a year before, 620,000 versus 635,000.

In June 2012, it was reported that Piers Morgan Tonight had the lowest ratings for a CNN primetime slot in 21 years. During the week of July 30, 2012, to August 5, 2012, the program averaged 314,000 viewers overall, with a mere 81,000 among adults 25–54—its lowest ratings to-date. Despite an uptick in the final quarter of 2012 amid the presidential election, and being CNN's most-viewed program in total viewership, total viewership of Piers Morgan Tonight declined by 19% year-over-year in 2012, and by 22% among adults 25–54.

Its viewership continued to decline; in June 2013, Piers Morgan Live experienced its second-lowest rated month of average viewership among adults 25–54 since January 2001. On February 20, 2014, the program recorded its smallest audience among adults 25–54 to-date, with only 50,000 (among around 270,000 total viewers).

== Cancellation ==
On February 23, 2014, CNN announced that Piers Morgan Live would be cancelled, with its final episode scheduled to air some time in March of the same year. The series aired its final episode on March 28, 2014; most of the broadcast consisted of coverage of the disappearance of Malaysia Airlines Flight 370. Morgan closed the broadcast with an appeal for stronger gun control legislation in the United States, stating that "I’m so pro-American, I want more of you to stay alive."

CNN would abandon having a talk show in the 9 p.m. hour of its schedule, with new CNN head Jeff Zucker choosing to experiment with airing factual, reality-style documentary series in the timeslot instead.

== Criticism ==
The programme was criticised for Morgan’s confrontational interviewing style, where he would interrupt his guests without letting them answer the questions. Morgan often claimed that they weren’t answering them. Morgan was confronted over his approach by various interviewees such as Ben Shapiro and Chelsea Handler.

Morgan also experienced controversy over his stance on gun control during his tenure, where he called for increased restrictions on members of the public buying guns. Morgan’s interviews with various pro-gun activists in the wake of the Sandy Hook shooting led to a “Deport Piers Morgan” petition being launched on the White House website, which received enough signatures to receive a response from the Obama administration, where they did not deport him, citing First Amendment rights.

== "Banned" guests ==
A March 2012 report at MTV.com claimed that "Morgan has apparently felt slighted over the years by Madonna ... he claims he was lied to by the singer's publicist", and that "Morgan escalated the feud, sending a snippy message to Madonna ... Morgan wrote, 'Welcome to Twitter @MadonnaMDNAday – you're still banned from my show. Love Piers.'" Morgan additionally banned Madonna's publicist Guy Oseary due to what he called "guilt by association".

In September 2012, it was reported that Morgan had additionally banned actor Kelsey Grammer after Morgan claimed Grammer "saw a photo of his ex-wife Camille in the open to our show and legged it." On September 26, 2012, KTTV in Los Angeles reported that "many say [it] was an ambush by Piers". The Huffington Post reported, "before the interview was scheduled, it was made clear that Grammer would answer all questions, including those about [his ex-wife]. His sole request was not to show any images of her." Morgan had also banned Hugh Grant from the show, calling him "a tedious little man".

== Countries broadcast ==
The show was aired in the United States and Canada on cable channel CNN and simulcast to the rest of the world via CNN International.

== See also ==
- Larry King Live
- Don Lemon Tonight
- Laura Coates Live
