= Laura Coates =

American legal analyst

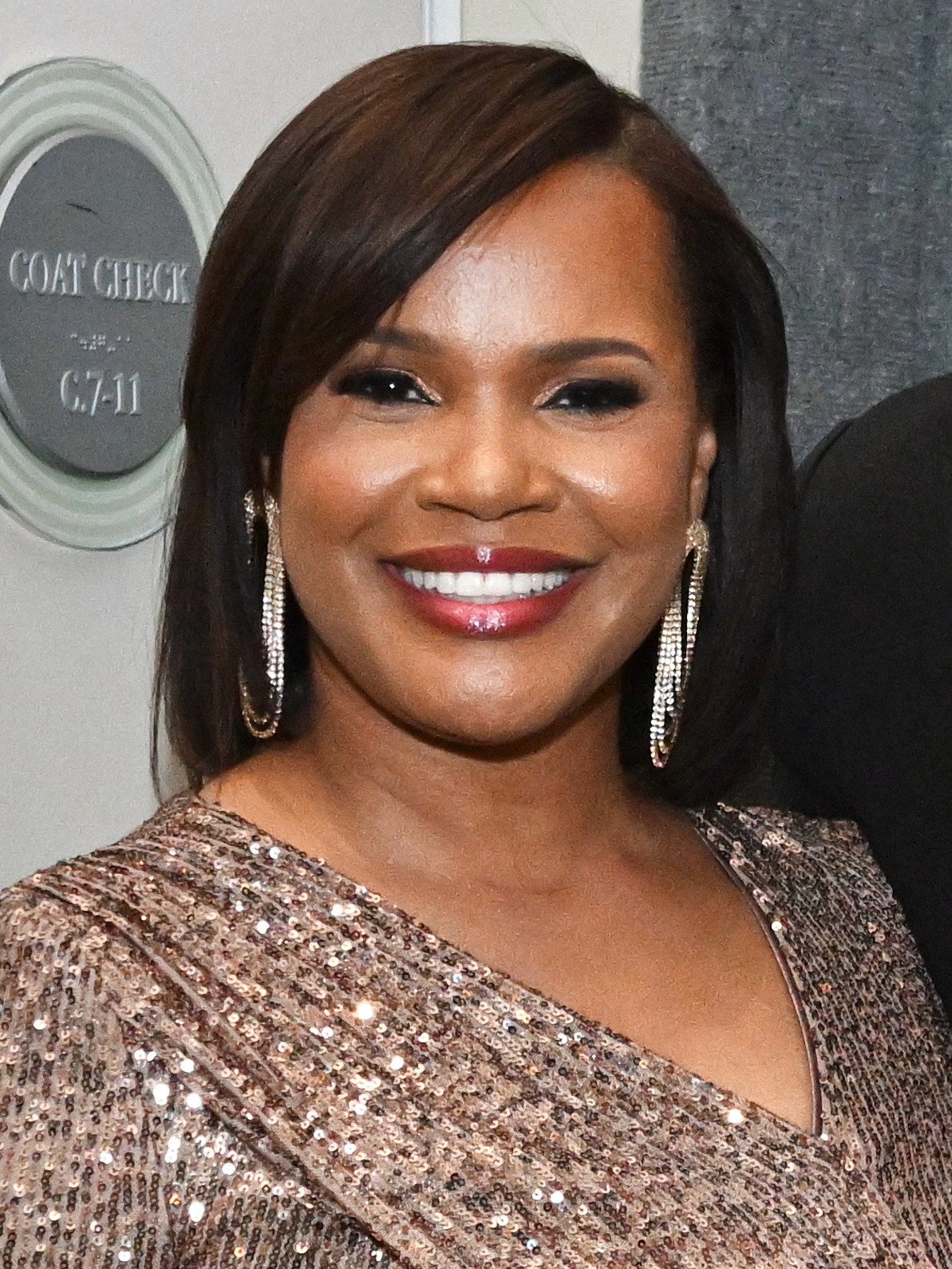
- Coates in 2024
- Born: Laura Gayle Coates; July 11, 1979 (age 47); Hartford, Connecticut, U.S.
- Education: Princeton University (BA); University of Minnesota (JD)
- Occupations: Attorney, news anchor, legal analyst, radio host, educator
- Known for: CNN analyst
- Spouse: Dale Gordon (m. 2010)
- Children: 2

Laura Gayle Coates (born July 11, 1979) is an American legal analyst, attorney and television personality. She has formerly served as a trial attorney for law firms Faegre & Benson and Kasowitz, Benson, Torres & Friedman and a federal prosecutor for the United States Department of Justice Civil Rights Division. Since 2016, she has served as a legal analyst for CNN and became the network's chief legal analyst in 2023. Since October 2023, she has also hosted a nightly news discussion TV program on the network, Laura Coates Live.

== Early life and education ==
Coates was born on July 11, 1979 in Hartford, Connecticut but was raised in Worcester, Massachusetts until the fourth grade when her family moved to Minnesota. She is the youngest of three sisters. Her father was a dentist. In 1997, she graduated from the St. Paul Academy and Summit School, a private college preparatory independent day school in Saint Paul, Minnesota. In 2001, she graduated with an A.B. from the Princeton School of Public and International Affairs after completing a 122-page senior thesis titled "The Legacy of Southern Redemption: An Examination of Felon Disenfranchisement Policy" under the supervision of Russ Nieli.

In 2005, she received a J.D. from the University of Minnesota Law School.

== Legal career ==
Coates began her legal career in Minnesota as an associate attorney at the firm of Faegre & Benson. She left Faegre to become an associate at the New York law firm of Kasowitz, Benson, Torres & Friedman.

She moved from private practice to the United States Department of Justice as a federal prosecutor. She was a trial attorney in the Civil Rights Division of the Department of Justice during the Bush and Obama administrations, specializing in the enforcement of voting rights throughout the country. She also served as assistant United States attorney for the District of Columbia, prosecuting violent felony offenses such as drug trafficking, armed offenses, domestic violence, child abuse and sexual assault. She is not currently a practicing attorney and is on inactive status with the Office of Lawyer Registration at the Minnesota Supreme Court.

== Television and radio ==
In May 2016, she joined CNN as senior legal analyst. In addition to appearances across CNN programs as an analyst, Coates would also be involved with various specials and town hall events broadcast by the network. She also hosts The Laura Coates Show on SiriusXM. In July 2018, Coates was suggested by Jeopardy! host Alex Trebek as a possible replacement once his contract ended.

In September 2022, ahead of the 2022 midterms, CNN announced that Coates would be an interim primetime host under the CNN Tonight branding, co-anchoring the 10 p.m.–midnight block with Alisyn Camerota. In January 2023, Coates moved exclusively to the 11 p.m. hour of CNN Tonight. Coates was quietly dropped from the program in March 2023.

On May 5, 2023, CNN announced that Coates had been promoted to chief legal analyst. On August 14, 2023, CNN announced that Coates would host a new 11 p.m. show: Laura Coates Live.

On April 19, 2024, she was covering the prosecution of Donald Trump in New York for CNN when she was suddenly interrupted and had to report live on the self-immolation of Maxwell Azzarello. She proceeded to rapidly narrate the immolation live for two minutes as it happened. She was widely praised for keeping her composure during her live coverage of the situation. However, both she and CNN faced criticism for initially misreporting an "active shooter" and for the split-second decision to show the graphic footage of the self-immolation live.

Coates plays a supporting role in the 2026 film The Mongoose.

== Publications ==
Coates has written features and provided research for major publications such as The Washington Post and the Boston Herald. Her first book, published in January 2016, was a legal guide entitled You Have the Right: A Constitutional Guide to Policing the Police. Coates' second book, Just Pursuit: A Black Prosecutor's Fight for Fairness, was released in January 2022, detailing her experience as a Black female federal prosecutor.

== Teaching ==
Coates is an adjunct law professor at George Washington University School of Law and routinely speaks across the country on civil rights, social justice, economic empowerment and other topics.

== Personal life ==
Coates married Dale Gordon in 2010. They reside in Washington, D.C. and have two children. Coates is a longtime fan of hip-hop. She is a member of Alpha Kappa Alpha sorority.
