= CNN NewsNight =

US television program

- Starring: Aaron Brown; Anderson Cooper; Abby Phillip

Production
- Production locations: 30 Hudson Yards; New York City
- Camera setup: Multi-camera
- Running time: 60 minutes

Original release
- Network: CNN; CNN International
- Release: November 5, 2001 – November 4, 2005
- Release: October 16, 2023 – present

Related
- Erin Burnett OutFront; Anderson Cooper 360°; The Source with Kaitlan Collins; Laura Coates Live

CNN NewsNight is a live news program broadcast by CNN and CNN International. It airs at 10:00 p.m. ET on weeknights and is currently hosted by Abby Phillip.

During its first run, the show focused on investigative journalism and had a strong emphasis on interviews. It included segments such as The Whip (which quickly previewed segments from four reporters at large), On the Rise, and Segment 7. The Morning Papers segment, known as The Rooster, featured a brief preview of compelling or interesting headlines from the next day's newspapers around the world. The segment concluded with the weather forecast in Chicago as provided in the Chicago Sun-Times.

To cover the increased amount of news generated by Hurricane Katrina and its aftermath in September 2005, CNN expanded NewsNight to two hours and added Anderson Cooper as a co-host. (Cooper's coverage of the natural disaster elsewhere on the network had given him strong ratings.) These changes were intended to last for the duration of the hurricane's aftermath, but CNN later announced that it would keep the new format and make Cooper a permanent co-host.

On November 3, 2005, CNN announced that it was canceling NewsNight and that Brown would leave the network. As of November 7, 2005, the timeslot was given to Cooper's show, Anderson Cooper 360°.

CNN NewsNight was revived on October 16, 2023, with host Abby Phillip; it airs weeknights at 10:00 p.m. ET on CNN. If Laura Coates Live is unavailable, the program extends its runtime to two hours.

Between November 29, 2023, and April 10, 2024, the program was not aired on Wednesdays after then-CNN chief Chris Licht wanted more personality-based programming on the network; this resulted in the launch of King Charles, a news discussion program co-hosted by Gayle King and former NBA player Charles Barkley. The programme performed poorly in the ratings, and on the April 10 broadcast, the hosts announced that it would be the final episode. Consequently, CNN Newsnight again became a five-nights-a-week program.

Preceded by The Source with Kaitlan Collins	CNN Weekday lineup 10:00–11:00 p.m.	Succeeded by Laura Coates Live
