= Erin Burnett OutFront =

Television news program hosted by Erin Burnett on CNN

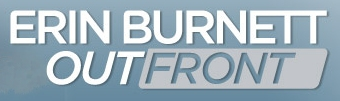
- Genre: News program
- Presented by: Erin Burnett
- Country of origin: United States
- Original language: English

Production
- Production locations: 30 Hudson Yards; New York City
- Camera setup: Multi-camera
- Running time: 60 minutes

Original release
- Network: CNN; CNN International
- Release: October 3, 2011 – present

Related
- Anderson Cooper 360°; The Source with Kaitlan Collins; CNN NewsNight with Abby Phillip; Laura Coates Live

Erin Burnett OutFront is an hour-long television news program hosted by Erin Burnett on CNN. The show premiered on October 3, 2011, in the 7:00 pm time slot to replace John King, USA. Until the launch of CNN Tonight in 2014, OutFront was also rebroadcast at 11:00 p.m. ET, occasionally aired live during rolling coverage of breaking news. CNN said in 2011 they hoped Burnett's expected popularity would provide an "attractive" opening to an evening of "talk shows and news analysis".

OutFront is broadcast live from CNN's Hudson Yards studios in New York City or on location from the site of breaking news events. Although the program airs normally from 7:00 pm to 8:00 pm ET weekdays, it may air at other times of the day or on weekends as events warrant.

From Monday, February 13 to Friday, February 17, 2023, an additional hour of OutFront was added at 9:00 pm ET on weekdays replacing the second hour of Anderson Cooper 360°.

== International broadcast ==
=== CNN International ===
From January 2015 until March 2020, OutFront had a repackaged thirty-minute format running on the weekends on CNN International.

As part of CNN International's schedule changes due to the COVID-19 pandemic, OutFront is now aired in its full hour-long format on weekdays, replacing the second hour of Your World Today.

=== CNN Philippines ===
From March 17 to May 29, 2015, OutFront aired in a full-hour slot at 5:00-6:00 pm local time as a pre-program to CNN Philippines Network News. To make way for a 5:45 pm slot for CNN Philippines Traffic Center, the show aired in a truncated 45-minute slot, serving as Traffic Center's pre-programming from June 2, 2015, to February 12, 2016. On February 16, OutFront moved to an earlier timeslot at 2:00 pm local time and returned to a full-hour slot.

From August to September 2016, OutFront moved to 8:30 am local time, and was reduced to 30 minutes as part of the network's program restructuring. When breaking news warranted, the timeslot (7:00 am local time) was temporarily replaced by a live simulcast from CNN International. OutFront is now watchable only on paid television in the Philippines after CNN Philippines' closure on January 31, 2024.

Preceded by The Lead with Jake Tapper	CNN Weekday lineup 7:00 pm – 8:00 pm	Succeeded by Anderson Cooper 360°
