= 30 Hudson Yards =

Skyscraper in Manhattan, New York

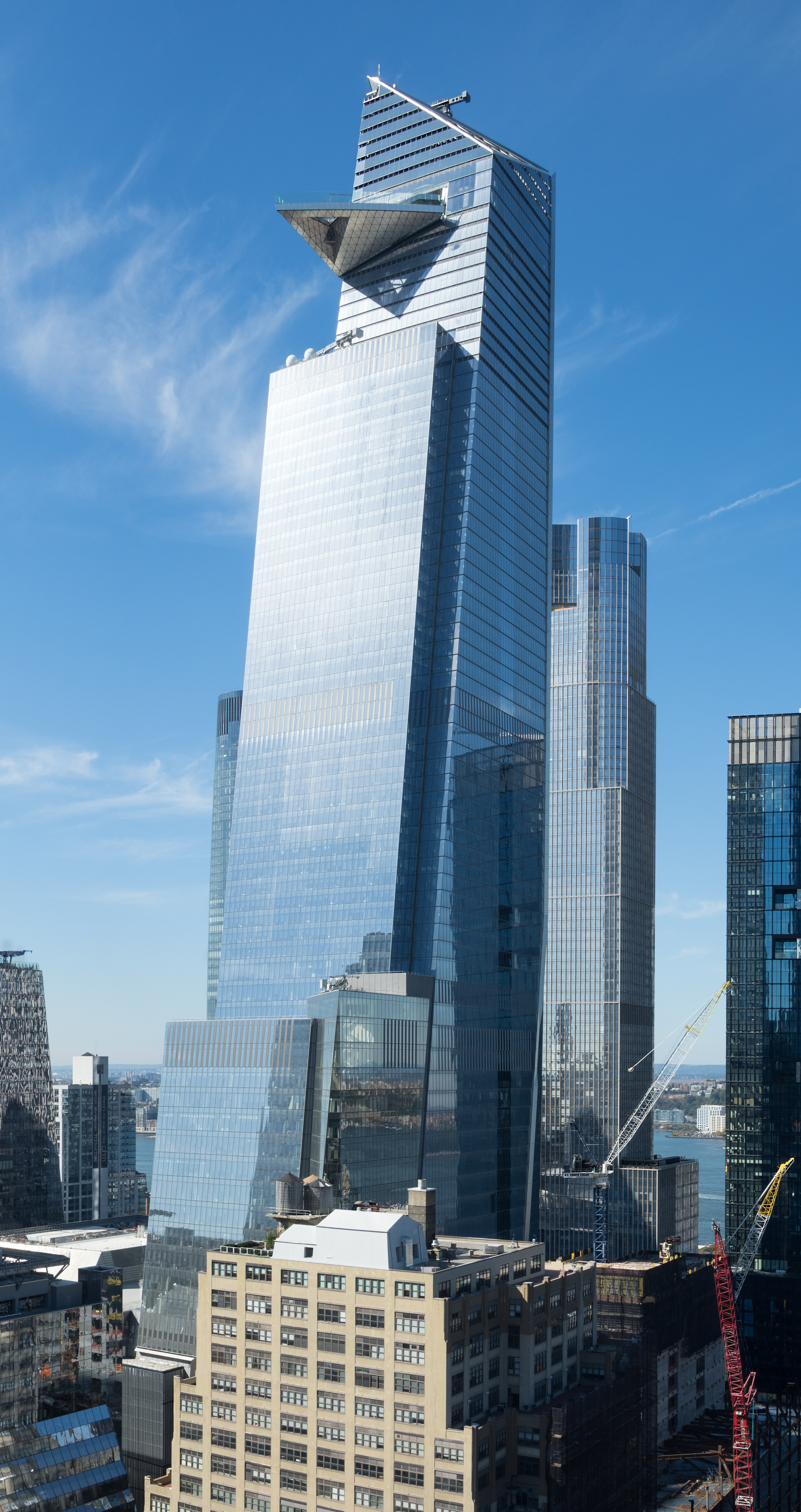
- 30 Hudson Yards in 2019
- Alternative names: Hudson Yards Tower A Manhattan Tower

General information
- Status: Completed
- Type: Office, Observation, Retail
- Architectural style: Neo-futurism
- Location: 500 West 33rd Street; Manhattan, New York 10001
- Coordinates: 40.7541°N 74.0008°W
- Current tenants: Various (See List)
- Groundbreaking: December 4, 2012
- Construction started: October 2014
- Opened: March 15, 2019
- Operator: The Related Companies L.P. Oxford Properties Group Inc.

Height
- Height: 1,270 ft (390 m)

Technical details
- Floor count: 73
- Floor area: 2,600,000 square feet (240,000 m^{2})
- Lifts/elevators: 59

Design and construction
- Architects: Kohn Pedersen Fox (architect & master planner)
- Engineer: Jaros, Baum & Bolles (MEP)
- Structural engineer: Thornton Tomasetti
- Main contractor: Tishman Construction

Website
- hudsonyardsnewyork.com/30-hudson-yards

Map of buildings and structures at Hudson Yards. Zoom the map and click on points for more details.

30 Hudson Yards (also known during construction as the North Tower) is a supertall commercial skyscraper on the West Side of Midtown Manhattan in New York City. Located near Hell's Kitchen, Chelsea, and the Penn Station area, the building is part of the Hudson Yards Redevelopment Project, a plan to redevelop the Metropolitan Transportation Authority's West Side Yard. It is the seventh-tallest building in New York City and the ninth-tallest in the United States as of May 2025.

The building has a triangular observation deck, known as The Edge, jutting out from the 100th floor, with a bar and event space on the 101st floor. This observation deck, at 1,100 feet (340 m), opened in March 2020 and is the second-highest outdoor observation deck containing optically transparent flooring in the world, after the Cabo Girão Skywalk. The building also serves as the headquarters for Kohlberg Kravis Roberts & Co., an American global investment company, and a New York office of multimedia conglomerate Skydance.

== History ==
The groundbreaking ceremony took place on December 4, 2012. Early construction work focused on building a platform to cover much of the Eastern Rail Yard, for much of Phase 1 to sit upon and to allow the Gateway Rail Tunnel project to pass underground with a clear path. The platform is rested on caissons that are drilled underground into the solid bedrock known as Manhattan schist. On December 12, 2013, it was announced that Tutor Perini Building Corp. was awarded a US$510 million contract to build the platform.

In 2013, Time Warner (later WarnerMedia, and now Skydance) announced its intention to move most of its offices to 30 Hudson Yards, vacating its current headquarters at the Time Warner Center, also owned by Related, at Columbus Circle. The company would occupy half the building, below the 38th floor.

In mid-2015, Related received a $690 million loan from Bank of America, Wells Fargo, and CIBC which allowed construction to start. By January 2016, the structure's first few aboveground floors were already complete. Construction of the observation deck at the top of the tower began in April 2018. The observation deck was nearly complete by mid-2018.

In January 2019, WarnerMedia hired Douglas Harmon and Adam Spies of Cushman & Wakefield to find a buyer that would sell their office condominium under leaseback agreement. WarnerMedia's office condo included more than 1.4 million square feet (130,000 m^{2}) on floors 16 through 51 and represented approximately 60 percent of the 90-story tower with 2.6 million square feet (240,000 m^{2}).

The building opened on March 15, 2019. One month later, WarnerMedia executed a leaseback and sold their space to Related and Allianz for $2.2 billion after signing a 15-year lease for 1.5 million square feet (140,000 m^{2}). The sale closed in June 2019. The partners financed the purchase with a 10-year, $1.43 billion commercial mortgage-backed security interest-only loan from Deutsche Bank, Wells Fargo, and Goldman Sachs. In May 2019, CNN began broadcasting from its new studios in the building.

In June, KKR took out a $490 million mortgage from Deutsche Bank on their office condominium space.

In December 2024, Visa Inc. and Stonepeak subleased portions of WBD's space.

== Tenants ==
- Lobby: Skydance, Wells Fargo, The Shops & Restaurants at Hudson Yards (retail), Bluestone Lane coffee
- Floors 1–15: Wells Fargo Securities
- Floors 16–23, 25–51: Skydance
- Floor 24: Convene
- Floor 25: (mechanical floor)
- Floor 35: (sky lobby)
- Floors 43–45: Visa Inc.
- Floor 52: (mechanical floor)
- Floors 60–66: Wells Fargo Securities
- Floors 72–73: The Related Companies
- Floors 74–83: Kohlberg Kravis Roberts
- Floor 79: (mechanical floor)
- Floors 100–101: (observation deck)
- Floor 101: Peak with Priceless Restaurant (event space)
- Floors 102–103: (mechanical floors)

== Studios ==
- 17N: Early Start
- 19X: Multi purposed studio
- 19Y: CNN This Morning, Quest Means Business
- 19Z: Erin Burnett OutFront, Fareed Zakaria GPS, CNN News Central, The Source
- 21L: Anderson Cooper 360°, CNN Newsnight

== Architecture and design ==
Kohn Pedersen Fox was chosen for the design of the building, while Thornton Tomasetti was lead structural engineer and Jaros, Baum & Bolles provided MEP engineering services. Originally planned to be 1,337 feet (408 m) tall, the building was later downsized to 1,270 feet (390 m) tall, making it still the development's tallest building. WarnerMedia's space features amenities including a cafeteria, a fitness center, a two-level auditorium and cinema and an outdoor deck. The protruding outdoor deck has resulted in reviewers likening the building's shape to a duck.

The building's lobby contains artwork by Spanish artist Jaume Plensa consisting of 11 stainless steel spheres hanging from the ceiling, meant to represent global unity and cultural diversity.

=== Edge NYC ===
The building is home to Edge NYC, a multi-sensory indoor and outdoor experience on the 100th and 101st floors of 30 Hudson Yards. Guests can explore immersive indoor installations and the outdoor sky deck suspended 1,100 feet (335 m) above Manhattan, alongside dining, cocktail, and nightlife experiences including Skyline Bar & Café, Peak with Priceless, Avenue Sky Lounge, and seasonal nightlife programming operated in partnership with TAO Group Hospitality.

The venue includes both indoor and outdoor areas, making it accessible in all weather conditions. The outdoor sky deck features a cantilevered terrace jutting 80 feet (24 m) outward south of the building on the 100th floor, providing 360-degree panoramic views of the Manhattan skyline and the Hudson River. Visitors can lean into the nine-foot (2.7 m) high clear glass barricade slanted 6.6 degrees outward. The deck includes a 225 sq ft (20.9 m²) glass floor triangle looking down 1,131 ft (345 m) to the street below, angled glass walls, skyline seats, and eastern point.

Edge NYC was developed as part of the Hudson Yards project by Related Companies and Oxford Properties. It opened to visitors on March 11, 2020, and temporarily closed two days later due to the COVID-19 pandemic in New York City. Edge reopened on September 2, 2020. Edge NYC is the highest outdoor sky deck in the Western Hemisphere.

In addition to Tao, Edge's partners included Journey, Moment Factory, and SOFTlab to create a sequence of installations including Pulse, a room translating the energy of the city into waves of light, color, and sound; Crystal Cave, a landscape of jewel-like forms that shift in appearance across the day; and Infinite City, a fragmented, luminous interpretation of the Manhattan skyline — all preceding the outdoor sky deck on the 100th floor, which serves as the culmination of the experience.Additional installations include Reflections, Kaleidoscope, Prism, and Skyrise.

Since 2025, Edge NYC has hosted Marquee Skydeck, a seasonal rooftop nightlife concept presented by Tao Group Hospitality. Operating on select evenings, primarily weekends from spring through autumn, the program features curated DJ performances 1,100 feet above the Manhattan skyline. Events are ticketed separately from general admission and are for guests aged 21 and over.

Edge NYC has received recognition across design and architecture publications since its opening in 2020. Interior Design magazine named Edge NYC a Best of Year Award winner in the Outdoor Space category; the opening indoor multimedia experience "Journey to Edge" received a separate Best of Year Award in the Exhibition/Installation category. Edge NYC has also received the Architecture MasterPrize in the Landscape Architecture category, Outdoor Designs subcategory, awarded by a jury of over 60 architects and design leaders.

== Gallery ==
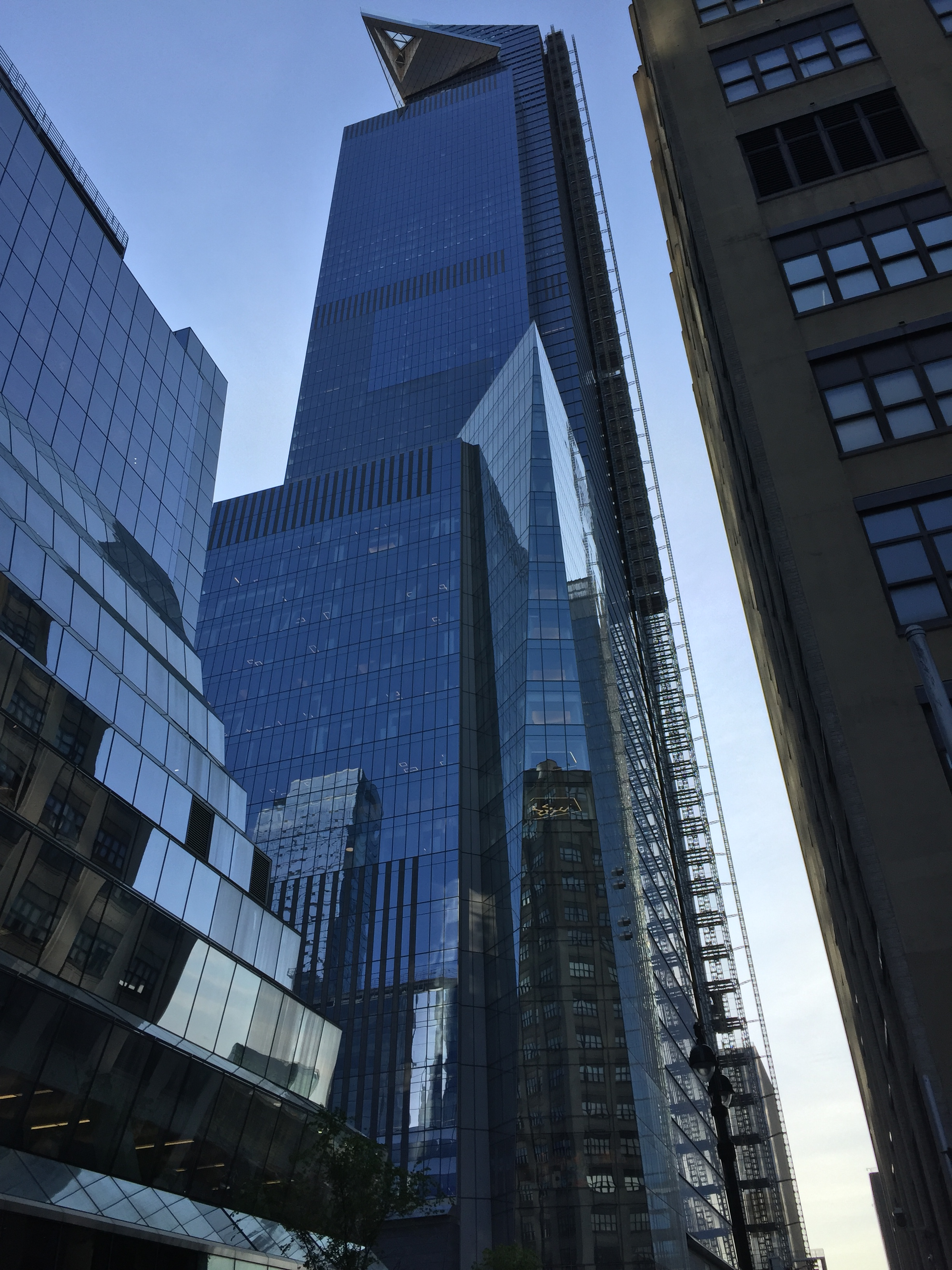
From the east, with 5 Manhattan West visible at left

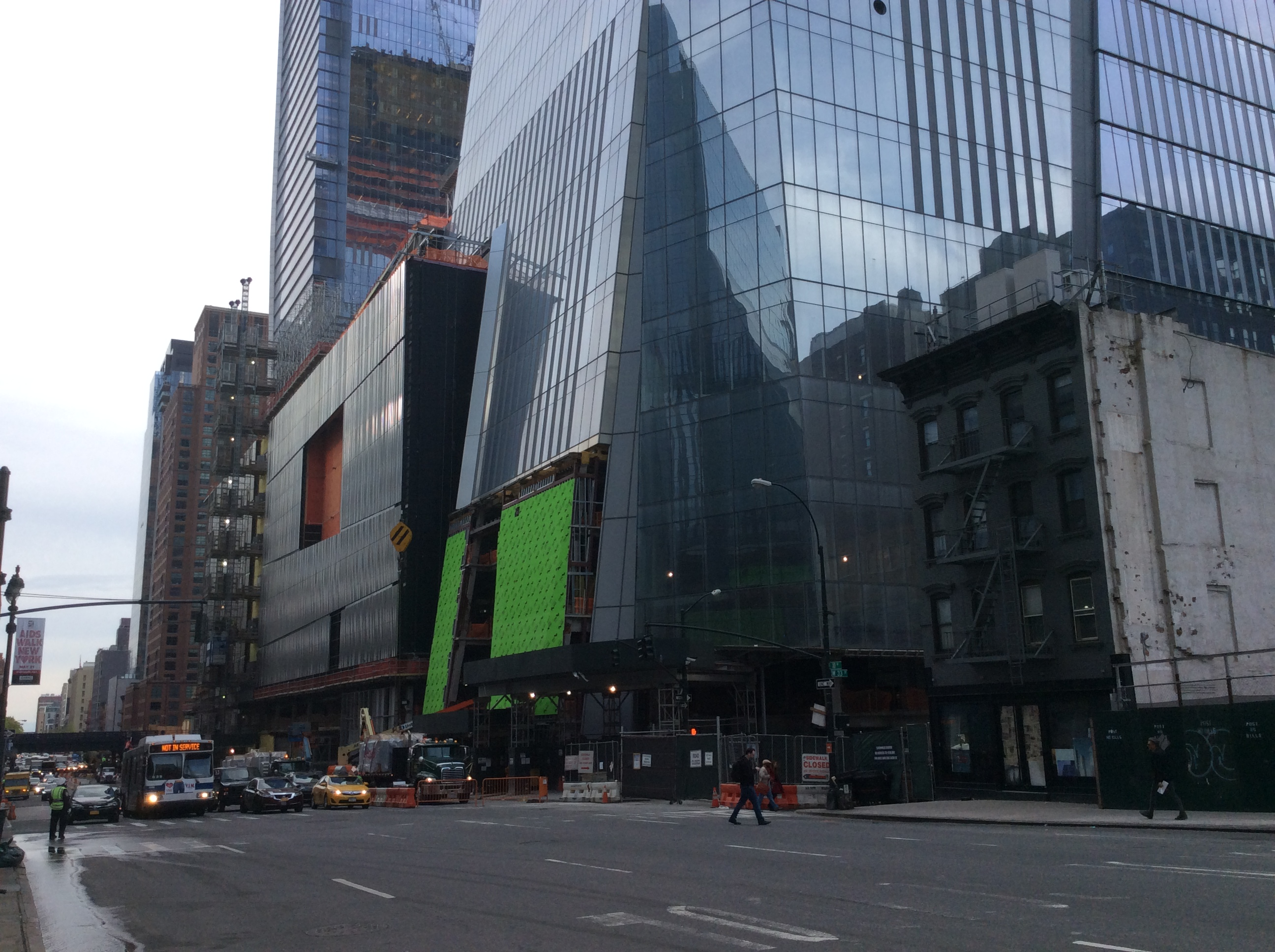
The tower's base

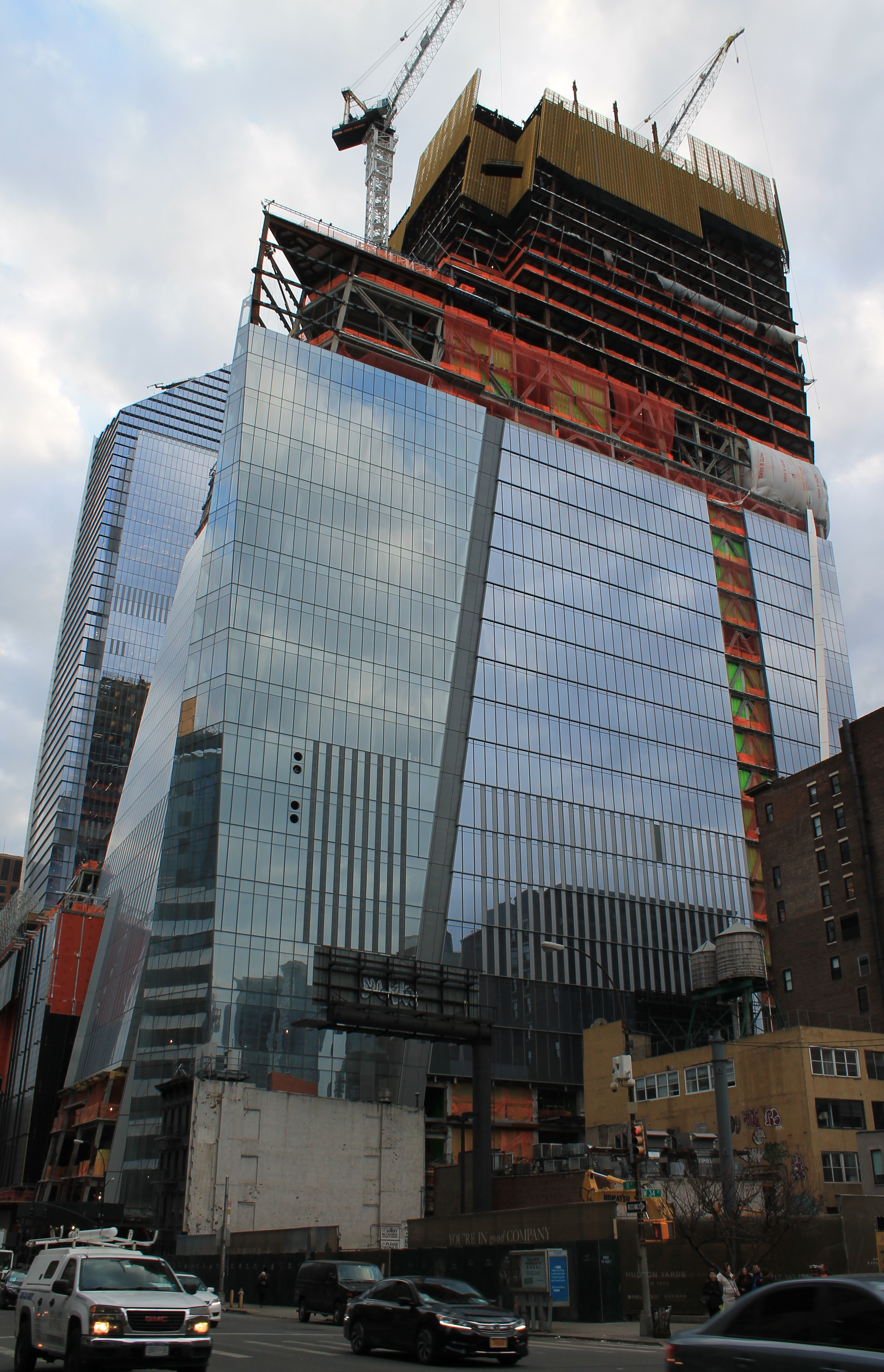
Under construction in March 2017

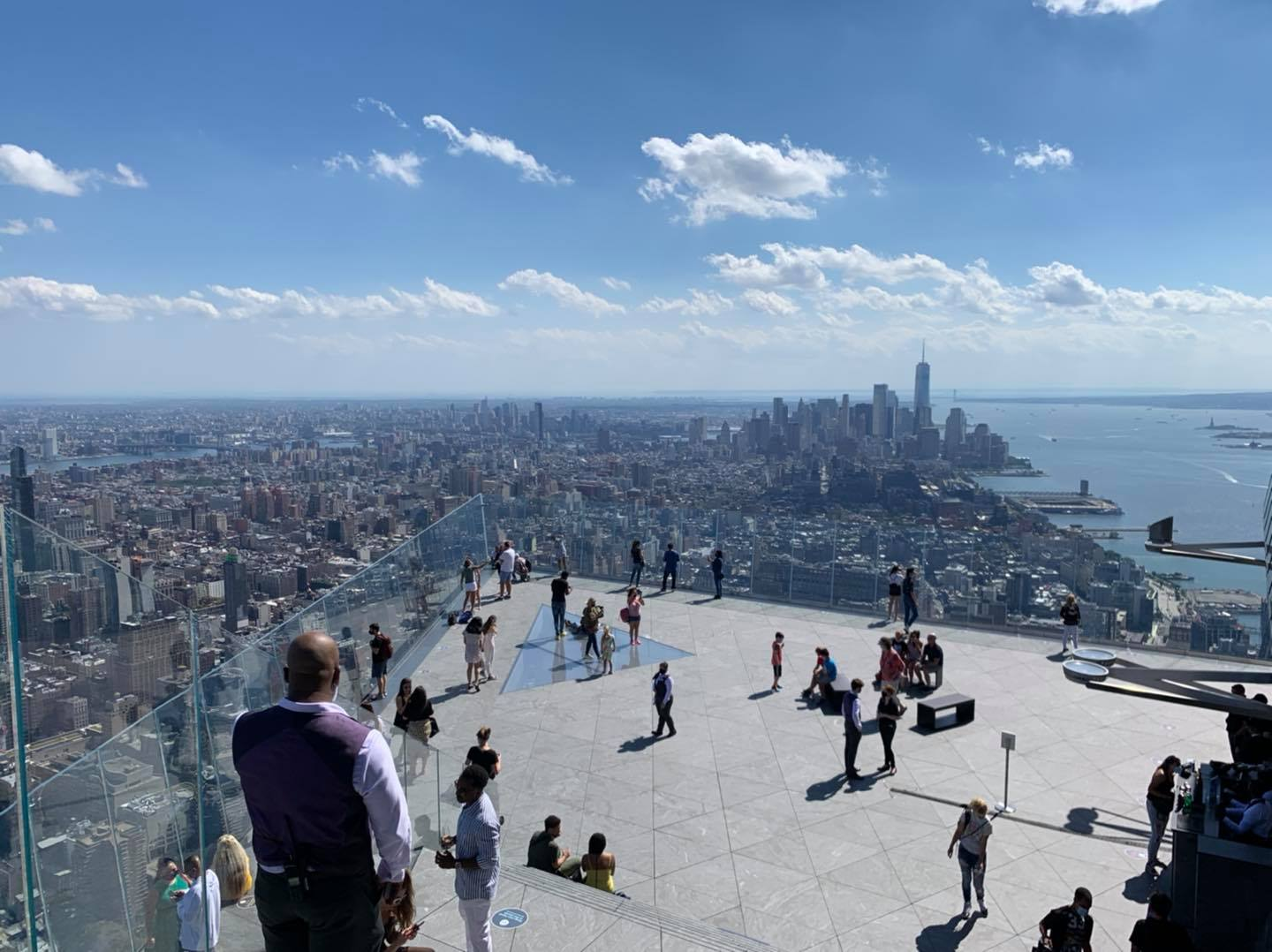
Edge NYC, facing south

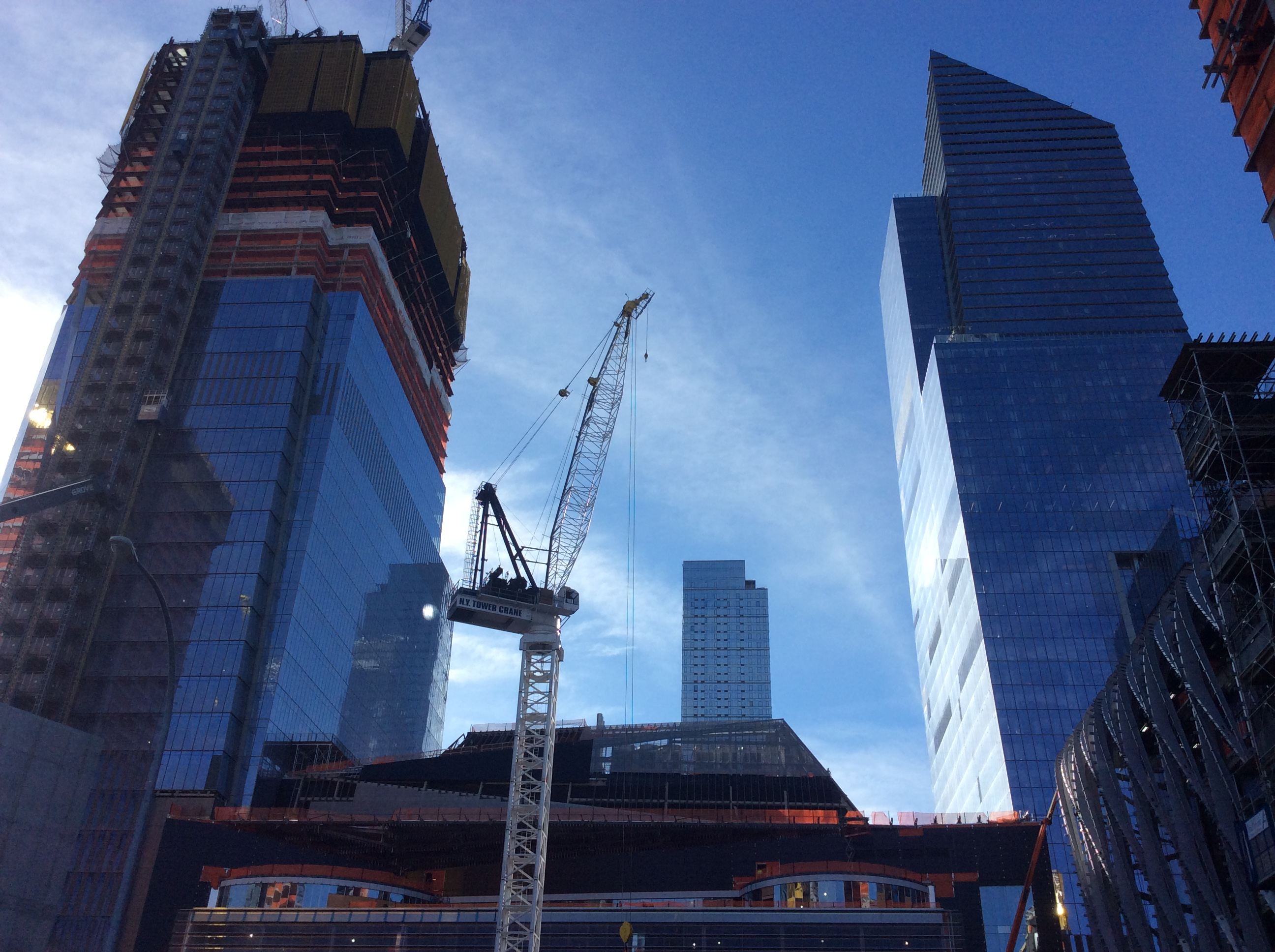
Under construction on the left with the completed 10 Hudson Yards on the right in May 2017

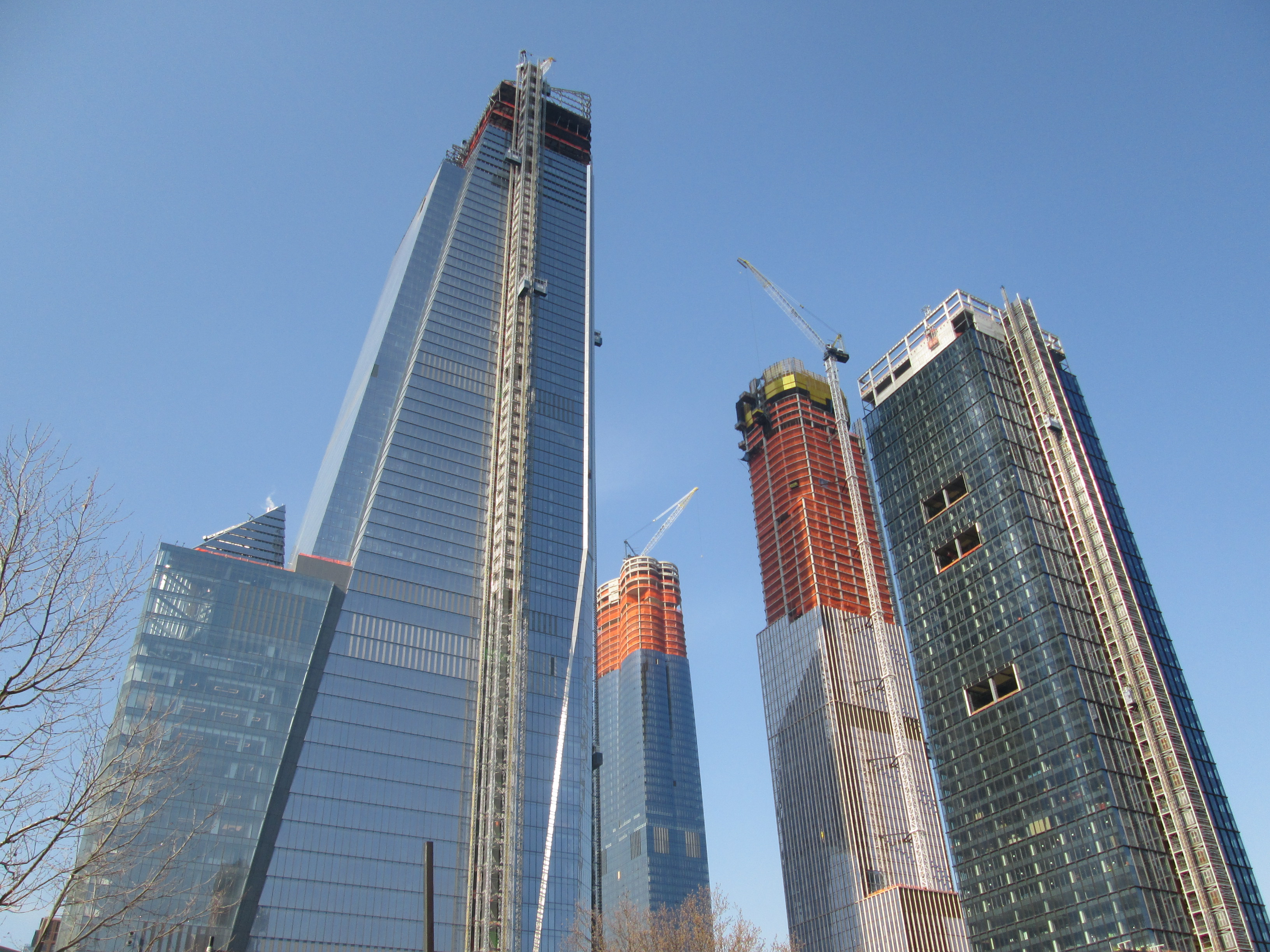
Under construction in April 2018

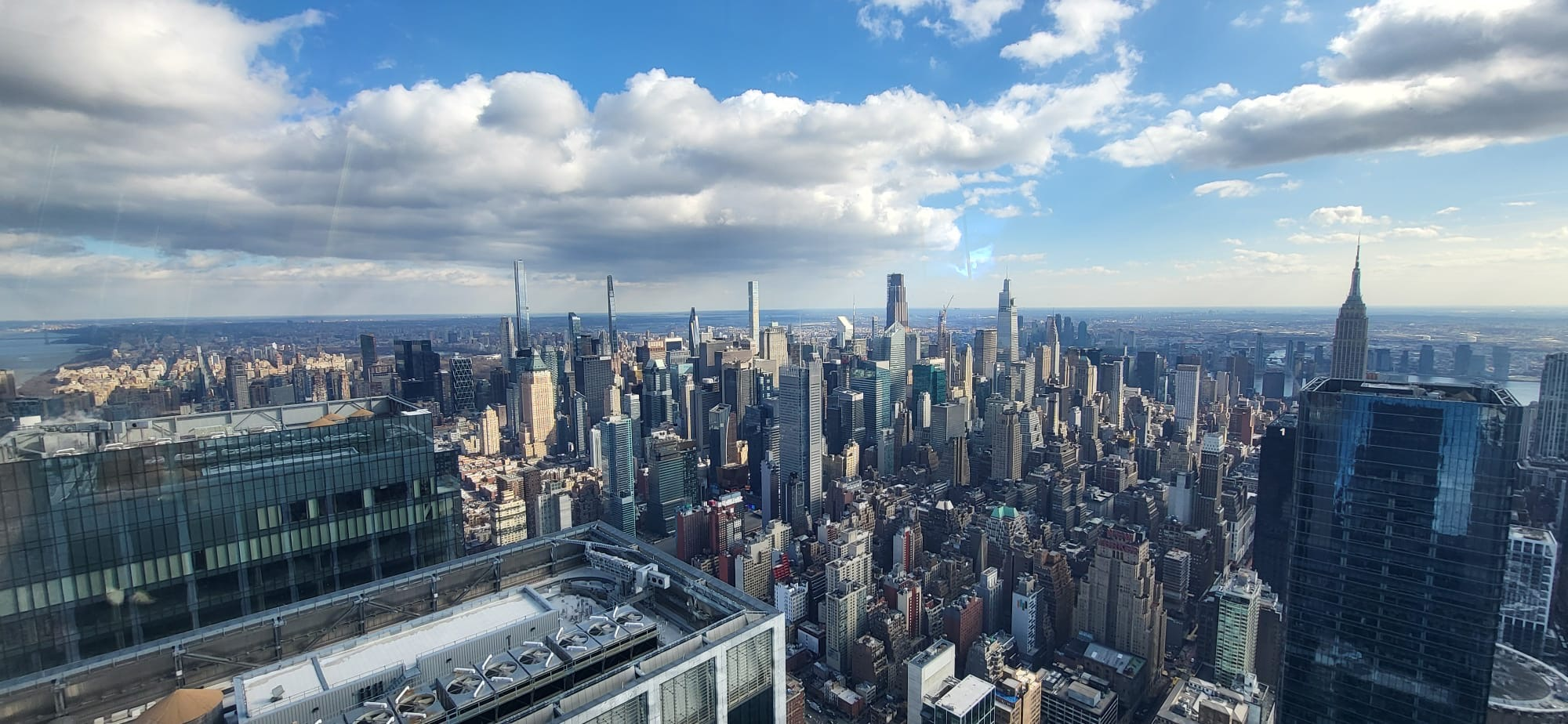
Panoramic view from the roof

== See also ==
- List of tallest buildings in New York City
- Hudson Yards Redevelopment Project
- List of tallest freestanding structures in the world
- List of tallest freestanding steel structures
- List of tallest buildings
