= John King, USA =

Former television news show hosted by John King on CNN

- Genre: News program
- Directed by: Reza Baktar
- Presented by: John King
- Country of origin: United States
- Original language: English

Production
- Executive producer: Rebecca Kutler
- Production locations: CNN Studios Washington, DC; CNN Studios Atlanta, Georgia

Original release
- Network: CNN
- Release: March 22, 2010 – June 29, 2012

John King, USA was an hour-long television news show hosted by John King on CNN. The show debuted on March 22, 2010, airing at 6:00PM ET, originally at 7:00PM ET until Erin Burnett OutFront replaced the original time slot on October 3, 2011. The final broadcast aired on June 29, 2012. A third hour of The Situation Room with Wolf Blitzer took over the time slot.
