= CNN controversies =

List of controversies related to CNN

CNN (Cable News Network), an American basic cable and satellite television channel, has been the subject of multiple controversies. This article recounts controversies and allegations relating to both the domestic version of CNN, and its sister channels CNN International and CNN-News18.

== Allegations of bias ==
CNN has often been the subject of allegations of party bias. The New York Times has described its development of a partisan lean during the tenure of Jeff Zucker. In research conducted by the Shorenstein Center on Media, Politics and Public Policy at Harvard University and the Project for Excellence in Journalism, the authors found disparate treatment by CNN of Democratic and Republican candidates during the earliest five months of the Democratic and Republican primaries in 2007: "The CNN programming studied tended to cast a negative light on Republican candidates—by a margin of three-to-one. Four-in-ten stories (41%) were clearly negative while just 14% were positive and 46% were neutral. The network provided negative coverage of all three main candidates with McCain fairing the worst (63% negative) and Romney fairing a little better than the others only because a majority of his coverage was neutral. It's not that Democrats, other than Obama, fared well on CNN either. Nearly half of the Illinois Senator's stories were positive (46%), vs. just 8% that were negative. But both Clinton and Edwards ended up with more negative than positive coverage overall. So while coverage for Democrats overall was a bit more positive than negative, that was almost all due to extremely favorable coverage for Obama." In a New York Observer column entitled "Clinton News Network", political journalist Steve Kornacki criticized CNN's handling of the November 15, 2007, Democratic presidential debate, calling it biased towards Hillary Clinton.

In September 2009, a Pew Research Center Poll showed that Democrats were much more likely than Republicans to rate the network favorably, while Republicans were much more likely than Democrats to see CNN unfavorably. A 2019 Pew Research survey showed that among Americans who named CNN as their main source for political and election news, 79% identify as Democrats whereas 17% identify as Republicans. Among major broadcast news networks, the CNN audience displays higher levels of partisanship than ABC, CBS and NBC, but lower than Fox News and MSNBC.

=== Octavia Nasr firing ===
In 2011, Chief Middle East correspondent Octavia Nasr was fired after a tweet saying she was "Sad to hear of the passing of Sayed Mohammad Hussein Fadlallah... One of Hezbollah's giants I respect[ed] a lot." Parisa Khosravi, senior vice president of CNN International, said she spoke with Nasr, and "we have decided that she will be leaving the company". Her reason for her removal was given as "As you know, her tweet over the weekend created a wide reaction. As she has stated in her blog on CNN.com, she fully accepts that she should not have made such a simplistic comment without any context whatsoever. However, at this point, we believe that her credibility in her position as senior editor for Middle Eastern affairs has been compromised going forward."

=== Coverage of the 2016 U.S. presidential election ===
==== Occupy CNN protest ====
On April 3, 2016, hundreds of supporters of Bernie Sanders protested outside of CNN's Los Angeles bureau on Sunset Boulevard. Sanders supporters were protesting CNN's coverage of the 2016 United States presidential elections, specifically in regard to the lack of airtime Sanders had received. Known as Occupy CNN, protesters claimed that major media networks have intentionally blacked out Sanders' presidential campaign in favor of giving much more airtime to candidates such as Hillary Clinton.

==== Donna Brazile and Roland Martin ====
In October 2016, WikiLeaks published emails from John Podesta which showed CNN contributor Donna Brazile passing the questions for a CNN-sponsored debate to the Clinton campaign. In the email, Brazile discussed her concern about Clinton's ability to field a question regarding the death penalty. The following day Clinton would receive the question about the death penalty, verbatim, from an audience member at the CNN-hosted Town Hall event. According to a CNNMoney investigation, debate moderator and CNN contributor Roland Martin (now with TV One) "did not deny sharing information with Brazile". CNN severed ties with Brazile on October 14, 2016. Brazile then resigned from CNN in October 2016 due to the revelations.

==== WikiLeaks emails ====
During live coverage of the 2016 elections, CNN anchor Chris Cuomo said that downloading the hacked and stolen Podesta emails from the WikiLeaks website was a violation of law and that only the media could legally do so. The statement was proven to be false and drew criticism to the network.

=== Coverage of the 2020 U.S. presidential election ===
==== CNN Iowa debate moderation ====
Following the 2020 Democratic Party presidential primaries debate moderated by CNN and the Des Moines Register on January 14, 2020, CNN was accused by various media pundits of bias towards centrist candidates. The debate moderation by CNN was described by Rolling Stone's Matt Taibbi as "villainous and shameful", and Zach Carter at The Huffington Post said the debate moderation was "awful", with Carter writing, "Again and again, CNN anchors substituted centrist talking points for questions―and then followed up predictable responses with further centrist talking points, rarely illuminating any substantive disagreements between the candidates or problems with their policy positions". Jeet Heer, the national affairs correspondent at The Nation said "the big loser of the night was the network that hosted the event. CNN was so consistently aligned against Bernie Sanders that it compromised its claim to journalistic neutrality."

A CNN article published shortly before the debate, which reported that Bernie Sanders allegedly told Elizabeth Warren in private during a 2018 meeting that a woman can't win a presidential election, was criticized for being viewed as a hit piece intended to depict Sanders as a misogynist prior to the debate and for being anonymously sourced. During the debate itself, the article was subject of a series of questions between the candidates.

=== Trump administration coverage ===
On January 10, 2017, CNN reported on the existence of classified documents that said Russia had compromising personal and financial information about then President-elect Donald Trump. CNN did not publish the Steele dossier, or any specific details of the dossier. Later that day, BuzzFeed News published the entire 35-page dossier with a disclaimer that it was unverified and "includes some clear errors". The dossier had been read widely by political and media figures in Washington, and had been sent to multiple other journalists who had declined to publish it as it was unsubstantiated. At a press conference the following day, Trump referred to CNN as "fake news" and refused to take a question from CNN reporter Jim Acosta.

On February 24, 2017, CNN and other media organizations such as The New York Times were blocked from a White House press gaggle. The network responded in a statement: "Apparently this is how they retaliate when you report facts they don't like. We'll keep reporting regardless."

On June 26, 2017, three network investigative journalists; Thomas Frank, Eric Lichtblau, and Lex Haris, resigned from CNN over a false story, later retracted, that connected Anthony Scaramucci to a $10 billion Russian investment fund. The network apologized to Scaramucci and stated that the online story did not meet their editorial standards.

In June 2017, the network also imposed new rules on Russia–related stories being published to social, video, editorial, or MoneyStream without going through the chain of command within CNN.

The Washington Post again fact-checked a CNN report regarding Trump on December 8, 2017: CNN ran a story that claimed two sources told the network that the Trump campaign received an email that gave Trump and his son Donald Trump Jr. early access to WikiLeaks documents on September 4, 2016. CNN, however, had not obtained the supposed September 4 email. The sender was "Michael J. Erickson", who CNN was not able to contact. The Washington Post, however, did obtain the email, which showed that the email was actually sent on the day after the hacked documents were released by WikiLeaks on September 14, 2016. CNN issued a correction of their story.

In January 2020, Don Lemon had a panel discussion on his show with Republican strategist Rick Wilson and The New York Times columnist Wajahat Ali, both of whom have spoken out against Trump. Lemon began laughing after Wilson joked, "Trump couldn't find Ukraine on a map if you had the letter 'U' and a picture of an actual physical crane next to it" and called Trump supporters "the credulous boomer rube demo." Lemon continued to laugh as the two guests mocked Trump supporters using a southern accent saying things like "you elitists with your geography and your maps and your spelling" and "Your math and your readin'." After Trump responded by calling Lemon "the dumbest man on television," Lemon defended himself saying "During an interview on Saturday night, one of my guests said something that made me laugh. And while in the moment I found that joke humorous, I didn't catch everything that was said. Just to make this perfectly clear, I was laughing at the joke and not at any group of people."

=== Donald Trump 2024 U.S. Presidential campaign coverage ===
On May 10, 2023, CNN held a Republican Town Hall with Donald Trump where news host Kaitlan Collins interviewed Donald Trump on stage with a live audience of New Hampshire Republican voters. Mainstream media organizations widely criticized the event, which came shortly after Trump was found liable for sexually abusing and defaming author E. Jean Carroll. The New York Times headline said, "Trump's Falsehoods and Bluster Overtake CNN Town Hall," while Slate called it "breathtakingly ill-conceived" The Wall Street Journal ran the headline, "Trump Mocks Sexual Abuse Case, Repeats False 2020 Election Claims at CNN Town Hall." CNBC reported, "Trump pushes false election claims, mocks E. Jean Carroll to applause during CNN town hall."

== Coverage on international incidents ==
=== Persian Gulf War ===
During the Persian Gulf War in 1990–1991, CNN was criticized for glorifying U.S. military action and excessively pushing human interest stories about American soldiers while avoiding depictions of violent images, the result being an alleged "propagandistic" presentation of the war. A report by Fairness and Accuracy in Reporting (FAIR) quotes an unnamed CNN reporter as describing "the 'sweet beautiful sight' of bombers taking off from Saudi Arabia" in a 1991 news report. CNN was criticized for having a Lockheed Martin consultant speak about the war, which was seen as a conflict of interest.

=== Operation Tailwind ===
In 1998, CNN, in partnership with sister Time magazine, ran a report that during the Vietnam War the U.S. Armed Forces used sarin gas against a group of North Vietnamese soldiers during Operation Tailwind in 1970 in Laos. The Pentagon denied the story. Skeptics deemed it improbable that such an extraordinary and risky atrocity could have gone unnoticed at the height of the Vietnam War's unpopularity. CNN, after a two-week inquiry, issued a retraction. The story's producers were summarily fired, and one of them has been highly critical of CNN's handling of the story, saying that the network bowed to pressure from high-ranking officials to kill the story.

=== Suppression of Bahraini protests, and reporting of Iran and Syria ===
In October 2011, correspondent Amber Lyon met with Tony Maddox, president of CNN International, twice about a documentary on advances of democracy in the Middle East in which she was featured, and which was aired in the US but never by CNN International—the most watched English news channel in the Middle East—despite a high production cost, international acclaim and awards. She claimed that during the second meeting she was threatened and intimidated to stop speaking on the matter. According to a CNN employee, officials from the Bahrain regime called CNN constantly complaining about Lyon's participation in the network. She was later laid-off.

=== Coverage of Margaret Thatcher's death ===
CNN was criticized for using a photograph of former Prime Minister of the United Kingdom Margaret Thatcher with disgraced BBC presenter Jimmy Savile four times during coverage of her death on April 8, 2013. Allegations of sexual abuse against Savile were made public in 2012, a year after his death, leading UK police to believe that Savile may have been one of Britain's most prolific sex offenders. An image of Thatcher with Chilean dictator Augusto Pinochet was also run during the broadcast, leading some commentators to accuse CNN of bias.

=== Coverage of Iranian protests ===
In 2014, the network was criticized for an unusual absence of live coverage of a large set of protests that followed the 2014 elections in Iran.

=== Conflict with Venezuelan government ===
On February 8, 2017, a joint CNN and CNN en Español investigation – based on the information provided by a whistleblower exiled in Spain and subsequent investigations, reported that employees of the Venezuelan Embassy in Baghdad, Iraq has been selling passports and visas to persons from Middle Eastern countries with dubious backgrounds for profits, including to members of the Lebanese group Hezbollah. The Venezuelan immigration department, SAIME, confirmed the sold passports' genuineness as each passport came with an assigned national identification number, although the names of these individuals were altered when checking against the national database. At least one individual's place of birth was also changed from Iraq to Venezuela. The Venezuelan foreign minister, Delcy Rodriguez, denied the government's involvement when questioned by the reporters during the Seventy-first session of the United Nations General Assembly, and accused the network of performing what she described as an "imperialistic media operation" against Venezuela for airing the year-long fraud investigation. On February 14, 2017, Venezuelan authorities banned CNN en Español from broadcasting two days after the Venezuelan president, Nicolas Maduro, ordered CNN to "[get] well away from here".

After the decision, CNN responded by providing a live-streaming service on YouTube and CNN en Español's website free of charge for Venezuelan viewers. The English-language CNN International channel is still being broadcast in Venezuela.

=== Essex truck deaths reports ===
On October 23, 2019, 39 dead bodies were discovered in a refrigerated truck in Essex, United Kingdom. There were initial reports from the media saying that all 31 men and eight women inside the truck were Chinese illegal immigrants being smuggled into the UK. On the October 25, 2019 Chinese Foreign Ministry's daily press conference, the Chinese foreign ministry spokeswoman Hua Chunying stated that "[t]he British police are working against the clock to verify the victims, but currently they are not able to confirm their nationalities." In a follow-up question, CNN reporter David Culver linked the incident with the 70th anniversary of the People's Republic of China celebrated earlier by asking "there have been many successes, advances and progress of the past 70 years with the People's Republic of China, [but] from an outside perspective, what would then motivate people from China to want to leave in such a risky way?" A similar CNN commentary was also published earlier questioning "Why would people from China, the world's second-biggest economy, risk their lives to enter the UK?" Hua claimed the question was inappropriate, repeated that the nationalities of the victims were still under verification, retorting: "What kind of answer did you hope to get from that?". She said the CNN reporter's presumption of linking the identity of those victims with the PRC's 70th anniversary reflected the "wrongful mindset" of the Western media. Hua also emphasized that the current pressing issue was to step up international cooperation in countering human trafficking, and find ways to avoid similar tragedies from happening again. In the report of CNN, this question was described only "about the possibility of Chinese citizens being illegally trafficked" and "was rebuffed by the spokesperson".

The video clip of the press conference was immediately widely publicized and circulated on Chinese websites and social media, with many Chinese being angered by CNN's question and praising Hua's "appropriate" reply. Hu Xijin, editor of the Chinese newspaper Global Times and an influential news commentator on the social media, said on his Weibo that the CNN reporter was "brought into a ditch" by the Chinese public intellectuals who "seemed to collude with each other". Hu said he wanted to remind those reporters they "should not just look at those few dissidents who hold different opinions and shouting on the Internet. Reach more to the general public in Chinese society. Don't just listen to opinions pleasing to yourselves." Later as the police confirmed that all victims were from Vietnam, the People's Daily also published an online commentary criticizing CNN for "violat[ing] the ethics of news reporting", and "show[ing] its intention to tarnish China's image without acquiring solid facts and final results from British police."

=== 2021 defamatory Kabul airlift story ===
On November 11, 2021, CNN aired a report about an alleged "black market" for rescue operations in Afghanistan after the Taliban takeover. CNN reported that Afghan refugees faced "exorbitant prices" to escape the Taliban. The report featured Zachary Young, a security consultant who was involved in rescuing the refugees. Young hired Kyle Roche as his attorney and subsequently sued CNN for defamation, stating his rescue operations were sponsored by charities and corporations, not paid for by the refugees themselves as CNN had implied. CNN aired an apology to Young but stood by its reporting. Several messages shown during the trial were used to portray prior knowledge that network editors knew that the story was inaccurate, and established malice, including statements by CNN's Chief National Security correspondent Alex Marquardt who said that he was going to "nail this Zachary Young mf—er." A jury in Florida ruled in favor of Young, finding that he was defamed and awarding $5 million in compensatory damages to him, and a settlement was reached for punitive damages. Marquardt later left the network.

=== 2022 Russian invasion of Ukraine ===
In February 2022, CNN faced criticism for playing an Applebee's commercial featuring the upbeat song "Chicken Fried" by the Zac Brown Band in a split-screen commercial break accompanied by a live shot of Kyiv. Following the incident, Applebee's suspended its advertising on CNN.

=== 2022 Nong Bua Lamphu massacre ===
One of the two CNN reporters reporting the crime was seen leaving the crime scene by climbing over the low wall and fence around the compound, and over the police tape. The reporters were fined and had to leave the country as they had been working under tourists visas. Police investigations determined that they were let in by a personnel who had no authority over such matters. CNN's video report of the crime scene was later pulled from their website. The Foreign Correspondents' Club of Thailand criticized the action as "unethical" and "insensitive" while the reporters and CNN apologized over the reporting.

=== Gaza War ===
During the ongoing war between Israel and Hamas, CNN has been accused by its own staff of producing biased coverage that privileges the Israeli point of view to such an extent that it ends up parroting pro-Israeli propaganda, and of applying tight restrictions on citing Hamas or Palestinian voices in general. The order from the channel's top brass, according to dissenting staffers, was that all actions Israel takes in the war, with their high casualty toll on Palestinian civilians in Gaza, should be explained as a consequence of the October 7 attack, thus justifying them. "Every action by Israel – dropping massive bombs that wipe out entire streets, its obliteration of whole families – the coverage ends up massaged to create a 'they had it coming' narrative," said one staffer, quoted by The Guardian. The Intercept obtained a memo from a senior CNN director forbidding that Hamas statements be quoted in most circumstances on the grounds that they are inflammatory; The Guardian's Chris McGreal remarked that, in contrast, inflammatory statements by Israeli officials were not only broadcast but were not even contested by CNN interviewers, such as when an Israeli officer claimed to Anderson Cooper that the entire population of the Gaza Strip could be considered combatants — a statement which Cooper did not challenge.

Early in the conflict, CNN reporter Sara Sidner was among the first to spread to a global audience the false rumor, created by Israeli sources, that dozens of babies and toddlers had been beheaded in Hamas's attack on southern Israel. When the Hamas leadership denied the allegations, Jerusalem bureau reporter Hadas Gold called the group's position "unbelievable" and falsely claimed there was footage of the events. CNN continued to promote the claims for "18 hours" even after the White House backtracked President Biden's claim that he had seen such videos.

A CNN employee, speaking anonymously to The Guardian, accused the network of "journalistic malpractice."

In September 2024, CNN journalists Dana Bash and Jake Tapper accused Representative Rashida Tlaib of antisemitism for supposedly questioning Michigan Attorney General Dana Nessel's ability to do her job due to her being Jewish, in response to Nessel's decision to prosecute pro-Palestinian campus protesters from the University of Michigan. Tlaib had not made such a comment about Nessel's ethnicity in an interview with the Detroit Metro Times, where she had talked about anti-Palestinian discrimination. The false claim was repeated by Jewish Insider and Anti-Defamation League CEO Jonathan Greenblatt. Tapper later claimed that he "misspoke", and Bash provided a "clarification" on her show.

=== 2024 Syrian prison story ===
In December 2024, CNN reporter Clarissa Ward and her team discovered a man in a locked room while reporting from a prison in Damascus amidst the Fall of the Assad regime in Syria. The man identified himself as civilian Adel Ghurbal and claimed to have not seen sunlight for three months, however the story came under immediate suspicion as he was perceived to be "fairly well-groomed and physically healthy for someone who had supposedly been tortured in solitary confinement". It was later revealed that the man in the report was actually Salama Mohammad Salama, a first lieutenant in Assad's Air Force Intelligence Directorate, and that he had only been incarcerated for a month on extortion-related charges. CNN confirmed that they had been misled regarding his identity. The network faced accusations that they had staged the report from critics on social media, but other journalists throughout the industry voiced support for Ward.

== Individuals ==
=== Executives ===
==== Resignation of Eason Jordan ====
In February 2005, Eason Jordan resigned from CNN. The resignation came in response to controversy sparked after bloggers wrote that, at the recent World Economic Forum, Jordan had seemed to accuse the U.S. military of having purposely killed journalists. While Jordan acknowledged his remarks were not sufficiently clear, he denied that this was what he had meant to imply, saying that he had "great admiration and respect for the men and women of the U.S. armed forces".

==== Jeff Zucker ====
CNN was criticized for its coverage of the Boston Marathon bombing, after erroneously reporting that a "dark-skinned male" had been arrested in connection with the attack. In the aftermath of the broadcast, Jeff Zucker – who became president of CNN in 2013 – lauded the coverage, claiming that "CNN shined this week", and boasted ratings success that CNN achieved during the coverage, adding that "viewers respected the network's accountability when it admitted its mistakes". Comedian Jon Stewart criticized Zucker's comments after calling CNN's coverage of the Washington Navy Yard shooting "breathless wrongness", claiming that, "The lesson they take from this is – it doesn't matter how much they betray our trust. We'll keep coming back."

In 2017, Vox described CNN as "treat[ing] politics like a sport" and stated that CNN under Jeff Zucker heavily uses debates to manufacture drama.

Zucker resigned from CNN on February 2, 2022, after previously failing to disclose a romantic relationship with CNN executive Allison Gollust during an internal review into the conduct of former CNN anchor Chris Cuomo. Gollust also resigned upon the conclusion of the review later that month, after parent company WarnerMedia released a memo stating that she was one of three top figures that had "violated its official journalism standards and practices".

=== Hosts and contributors ===
==== Brooke Baldwin ====
During the 2015 Baltimore riots, CNN Newsroom host Brooke Baldwin suggested that veterans were responsible for the unrest, saying soldiers who become police officers "are coming back from war, they don't know the communities, and they're ready to do battle". Baldwin initially pushed back critics, claiming she was just repeating something a city official had told her. She later apologized via Twitter and on-air.

==== Erin Burnett ====
In a 2011 coverage about Occupy Wall Street, Erin Burnett, who was new to the network at the time, attracted criticism for being naive about what people were actually protesting for.

==== Jack Cafferty ====
On the April 9, 2008 broadcast of CNN's The Situation Room, asked to comment on the United States' relationship with China, Jack Cafferty responded: "I think they're basically the same bunch of goons and thugs they've been for the last 50 years". The Legal Immigrant Association started an online petition calling for a formal apology, indicating that Cafferty's rant was anti-Chinese and had the effect of exacerbating negative attitudes held by Americans toward Chinese and Chinese Americans. On the April 14, 2008 broadcast of CNN's Situation Room, Jack Cafferty clarified his remarks: "Last week, during a discussion of the controversy surrounding China's hosting of the Olympic Games, I said that the Chinese are basically the same bunch of goons and thugs they have been for the last 50 years. I was referring to the Chinese government, and not to Chinese people or to Chinese Americans." CNN issued a controversial apology on April 14, to "anyone who has interpreted the comments to be causing offense." Not satisfied with CNN's response, several thousand demonstrators picketed CNN's Atlanta, Georgia and Hollywood offices and demanded that CNN remove him from the network.

A protest was held on April 26, 2008, in front of CNN headquarters in Atlanta. On the same day, a few thousand Chinese and Chinese Americans protested in front of a CNN office in San Francisco.

On May 15, 2008, according to Chinese Foreign Ministry spokesman Qin Gang, CNN President Jim Walton sent a letter to Zhou Wenzhong, Chinese ambassador to the United States: "On behalf of CNN I'd like to apologize to the Chinese people for that. CNN has the highest respect for Chinese people around the world and we have no doubt that there was genuine offense felt by them over the Jack Cafferty commentary." CNN, however, denies that an apology to the Chinese government was ever made, stating that it was meant for the Chinese people alone.

==== Carol Costello ====
On October 22, 2014, CNN Newsroom host Carol Costello reported on the audio release of Bristol Palin being assaulted by a man at a get-together in Alaska. Costello laughed and called it "quite possibly the best minute and a half of audio we've ever come across". She was instantly criticized for making fun of a woman who was being physically abused by a man she did not know, as well as for being a hypocrite after recently calling for ESPN to suspend Stephen A. Smith after comments he made about women during the Ray Rice controversy. Costello eventually apologized in a statement to Politico, stating: "Over the past few days, I have been roundly criticized for joking about a brawl involving the Palin family. In retrospect, I deserve such criticism and would like to apologize."

==== Chris Cuomo ====
On November 30, 2021, broadcaster Chris Cuomo was suspended indefinitely after New York Attorney General Letitia James released new documents showing that he had helped his brother, former New York Governor Andrew Cuomo battle sexual harassment allegations. CNN said in a statement that "these documents point to a greater level of involvement in his brother's efforts than we previously knew." Four days later, CNN fired Cuomo after hiring a law firm to conduct a review of the matter.

==== Don Lemon ====
In a June 2015 episode of WTF with Marc Maron, then-President Barack Obama used the racial slur "nigger" while discussing racism in the United States, particularly in the wake of the then-recent Charleston church shooting in South Carolina. On the June 22, 2015 broadcast of CNN Tonight with Don Lemon, host Don Lemon, in an apparent attempt to spark debate on the topic, held up the Confederate battle flag, and rhetorically asked the audience if they were offended; he then did the same with a large sign, with the aforementioned slur printed on it in large letters. Lemon's actions received widespread mockery on social media, and spawned a meme wherein the content of the sign was edited to display various phrases or images, alongside a chyron that read "Does This Offend You?"

On the February 16, 2023 broadcast of CNN This Morning, Lemon made disparaging remarks about Nikki Haley, who had announced her 2024 presidential campaign two days earlier. Lemon claimed that Haley, who was 51 years old at the time, "isn't in her prime", adding that "[a] woman is considered to be in her prime in her 20s and 30s and maybe 40s. If you Google 'when is a woman in her prime,' it'll say 20s, 30s and 40s." When co-host Poppy Harlow challenged his statements, Lemon told her to "look it up." Amid a public outcry, Lemon tweeted that afternoon that his comments were "inartful and irrelevant, as colleagues and loved ones have pointed out, and I regret it." He was absent from the February 17 broadcast, and called into a CNN staff meeting that day to apologize for his comments. CNN chairman and CEO Chris Licht stated during the same meeting that he was "disappointed" by Lemon's comments, describing them as "upsetting, unacceptable and unfair to his co-hosts, and ultimately a huge distraction to the great work of this organization." In a February 17 interview with Fox News, Haley dismissed Lemon's comments, saying they were "something that I have faced all of my life," and attributed them to her status as "a minority, conservative, female". On February 19, 2023, The Daily Beast reported that Lemon would again be absent from CNN This Morning the following day, February 20; a source told the site that there were "ongoing conversations about Don's future," and that Lemon was "a constant distraction."

Lemon was fired from CNN on April 24, 2023, after Variety reported that he mistreated female employees throughout his tenure at the network.

==== Fredricka Whitfield ====
On June 13, 2015, while discussing the 2015 attack on the Dallas police headquarters, host Fredricka Whitfield referred to the gunman, James Boulware, as "courageous and brave, if not crazy". The comment received immediate backlash and calls for her to apologize. The next day, Whitfield stated on air that she misspoke and in no way believed the gunman was courageous or brave. After the backlash continued, she issued another on-air apology on June 15, saying she terribly misused those words, now understood how offensive it was and was sincerely sorry.

==== Lou Dobbs ====
CNN host Lou Dobbs promoted the false conspiracy theory that Barack Obama was not born in the United States. His willingness to raise the "birther" issue repeatedly even though CNN itself considered it a "discredited rumor", led The Washington Post's TV critic to remark that this "explains their upcoming documentary: 'The World: Flat. We Report – You Decide.'" The issue had come up in 2008 during the Presidential campaign, and had largely disappeared from the media spotlight until Dobbs picked up the issue again. His statements in support of these conspiracy theories were dubbed "racist" and "defamatory" by the Southern Poverty Law Center. The controversy led to Media Matters airing ads critical of Dobbs and of CNN, and to Jon Stewart mocking Dobbs on the satirical Comedy Central television series The Daily Show. The New York Times said that Dobbs had "become a publicity nightmare for CNN, embarrassed his boss and hosted a show that seemed to contradict the network's 'no bias' brand."

==== Reza Aslan ====
After the 2017 London Bridge attack, CNN host Reza Aslan took to Twitter to call then-President Donald Trump "a piece of shit" and a "man baby" for his response to the attack. In response to his remarks, CNN announced on June 9 that they had severed ties with Aslan and said they would not move forward with season two of the Believer series. Aslan said of the cancellation, "I am not a journalist. I am a social commentator and scholar. And so, I agree with CNN that it is best that we part ways."

==== Rick Santorum ====
In 2021, the network "parted ways" with Rick Santorum for remarks he made about Native Americans.

== Other ==
=== Semiautomatic weapons ===
CNN apologized for a May 15, 2003 story in which CNN's John Zarella and Broward County, Florida Sheriff Ken Jenne demonstrated the rapid firing of fully automatic firearms while covering the Federal Assault Weapons Ban, due to expire the following year. The Assault Weapons Ban was concerned solely with semiautomatic firearms, not fully automatic ones, which had already been restricted by the National Firearms Act of 1934, and the subsequent 1986 Firearm Owners Protection Act.

=== Jon Stewart's Crossfire appearance ===
Comedian Jon Stewart appeared on Crossfire on October 15, 2004, and criticized its format and the style of arguments presented on the show. He called hosts Tucker Carlson and Paul Begala "partisan hacks", and asked them to "stop hurting America". Begala argued that the purpose of the show was that it was intended as for debate, to which Stewart responded "To do a debate would be great. But that's like saying pro wrestling is a show about athletic competition" and called Carlson's signature bow-tie an example of "theater". At one point Carlson told Stewart "I think you're more fun on your show", Stewart replied by saying: "You know what's interesting though? You're as big a dick on your show as you are on any show." Carlson later told Stewart that, "You need to get a job at a journalism school, I think", to which Stewart quipped, "You need to go to one".

Carlson departed CNN in January 2005; the network cancelled Crossfire at that same time. CNN president Jonathan Klein stated that, "I agree wholeheartedly with Jon Stewart's overall premise." Carlson said that he had resigned from CNN before Stewart's appearance claiming: "I resigned from Crossfire in April, many months before Jon Stewart came on our show, because I didn't like the partisanship, and I thought in some ways it was kind of a pointless conversation... each side coming out, you know, [raises fists] 'Here's my argument', and no one listening to anyone else. [CNN] was a frustrating place to work." Begala remained with CNN after Crossfire's cancellation.

=== Steubenville High School rape case coverage ===
Candy Crowley, Poppy Harlow and Paul Callan were criticized for being sympathetic towards the two convicted rapists in the Steubenville High School rape case and for placing very little focus on the victim on March 17, 2013. During the course of the delinquent verdict, Harlow stated that it was "Incredibly difficult, even for an outsider like me, to watch what happened as these two young men that had such promising futures, star football players, very good students, literally watched as they believed their lives fell apart...when that sentence came down, [Ma'lik] collapsed in the arms of his attorney... He said to him, 'My life is over. No one is going to want me now.'" An online petition garnered over 200,000 signatures protesting the coverage and demanding an apology.

=== Coverage of the Cleveland kidnapping victims ===
On the morning of May 7, 2013, CNN interrupted coverage of the Jodi Arias murder trial with an update of the release of three young women from Cleveland, Ohio who were kidnapped by Ariel Castro between 2002 and 2004. CNN correspondent Ashleigh Banfield appeared to interview HLN host Nancy Grace from a remote location, and it appeared that both were filming from parking lots. The channel graphics later alerted viewers that both reporters were in Phoenix, Arizona. The same cars were noticeable driving behind the two anchors, first behind Banfield and then by Grace. It became obvious that Grace and Banfield were, in fact, sitting in the same parking lot, pretending to be in remote locations when both were actually approximately 30 feet from each other.

=== #CNNBlackmail controversy ===
On July 2, 2017, then-President Donald Trump posted a video on Twitter depicting him repeatedly clotheslining and punching WWE owner Vince McMahon on the ground during WrestleMania 23. The clip had been edited to place a CNN logo over McMahon's face. Two days later, CNN published a story entitled, "How CNN found the Reddit user behind the Trump wrestling GIF", which labeled Reddit user "HanAssholeSolo" as the creator of the viral video. In the article, political reporter Andrew Kaczynski explained the process that allowed the organization to discover the identity of the user.

After the publication of the article, the user posted an apology to CNN, including apologies for previous Reddit postings that could be taken as well as containing racist, anti-Islam, and anti-Semitic language and imagery on the Reddit group /r/The_Donald. Immediately afterwards, his apology was locked and deleted by the subreddit's moderators while the user deleted his Reddit account. After confirming the identity of the Reddit user, HanAssholeSolo expressed his unwillingness for his name to be released to the public. In response, CNN stated that they would not reveal his name, as he was "[a] private citizen who has issued an extensive statement of apology, showed his remorse by saying he has taken down all his offending posts, and because he said he is not going to repeat this ugly behavior on social media again. In addition, he said his statement could serve as an example to others not to do the same. CNN reserves the right to publish his identity should any of that change."

Prominent users on social media subsequently accused CNN of blackmailing the user, using a hashtag, #CNNBlackmail, that was heavily promoted by Julian Assange, as well as various online activists and journalists. Particular attention was drawn to the line in the article, "CNN reserves the right to publish his identity should any of that change.", with many claims being made that this was a doxing threat. Madison Malone Kircher of New York magazine opined that "the moralistic, parental tone of the reasoning, combined with the oddly extortionate line about publishing his identity, makes the article sound less like news and more like an odd bit of internet vigilantism.", going on to say the controversy could likely have been avoided "simply by ending the article after the words 'private citizen'."

Kaczynski responded by stating that CNN's statement was "misinterpreted", and that the user said that he was not threatened prior to his apology. CNN's decision to withhold the user's name was also criticized by William Grueskin, a professor at Columbia University. Grueskin argued that the user was neither an abuse victim nor a confidential witness nor a juvenile. Meanwhile, Indira Lakshmanan of Poynter Institute said that it was more likely that, out of fear, the user begged CNN to have his name withheld.

=== Coverage of the January 2019 Lincoln Memorial confrontation ===
On March 12, 2019, lawyers of Nick Sandmann, who was involved in the January 2019 Lincoln Memorial confrontation, filed a lawsuit on his behalf against CNN, seeking US$275 million in damages, for allegedly "vicious" and "direct attacks" towards Sandmann. On January 7, 2020, the lawsuit was settled. The terms of the settlement have not been made public in 2024.

=== Coverage of the Kenosha unrest ===
On the night of August 26, 2020, CNN displayed a video caption during a news report showing a building engulfed in flames during the Kenosha unrest that read "Fiery But Mostly Peaceful Protests After Police Shooting". Conservatives and other users on social media criticized the caption, including Eric Trump, son of then-President Donald Trump.

=== Propaganda allegations on Expo 2020 coverage ===
In July 2021, CNN made an announcement that it will be the official broadcaster for the Expo 2020 Dubai, which was to be inaugurated in October 2021. Consequently, the news media initiated a "Dubai Now" vertical, covering the city's progress. Human rights group Freedom Forward criticized the agreement between the Emirates and CNN, and urged for the media house to be transparent about their relationship with the Arab nation, both on the financial and contractual terms.

== See also ==
- Anti-CNN
- Al Jazeera controversies and criticism
- CBS News controversies and criticism
- BBC controversies
- Fox News controversies
- List of The New York Times controversies
- MSNBC controversies
- Press TV controversies
