= Phil Mattingly =

American journalist (born 1983)

- Born: December 16, 1983 (age 42)
- Education: Ohio State University (BA); Boston University (MA)
- Occupation: Journalist
- Years active: 2007–present
- Employer: CNN
- Awards: WHCA Award for Excellence in Presidential News Coverage Under Deadline Pressure

Phil Mattingly (born December 16, 1983) is an American journalist who is CNN's chief domestic correspondent. Mattingly is the former co-anchor of CNN's flagship morning program CNN This Morning with Poppy Harlow. He is the network's former Chief White House correspondent, who received the 2023 White House Correspondents' Association Award for Excellence in Presidential Coverage Under Deadline Pressure – Broadcast.

He also served as the network's senior White House correspondent and congressional correspondent. Previously, Mattingly worked at Bloomberg Television in Washington, D.C., where he served as that network's White House correspondent and a national political correspondent.

== Career ==
After graduating from Ohio State University (where he was on the baseball team) and then Boston University, Mattingly found work at The Lima News and then with Congressional Quarterly in 2007, as an economic and financial affairs reporter covering the banking committees and the financial crisis.

In 2010, Mattingly joined Bloomberg News where he served as a Finance and Economics Reporter and helped lead Bloomberg's coverage of the federal response to the financial crisis. In 2012, Mattingly was named as a Justice Department correspondent. In 2013, he was named as a White House correspondent covering the Obama administration. After a stint at the White House, Mattingly was named as Bloomberg's national political correspondent, covering the politics and policies behind the 2016 presidential campaigns.

In December 2015, Mattingly was hired by CNN as a New York City-based correspondent. He spent 2016 on the campaign trail covering Republican presidential candidates Chris Christie, John Kasich and Donald Trump. His work included a series of investigative pieces into Trump's business history, finances and taxes.

Later he was assigned to Capitol Hill as a congressional correspondent. In that role, Mattingly was one of the lead reporters contributing to CNN's extensive coverage of the Republican attempts to repeal and replace Obamacare, the Capitol Hill spending and shutdown battles, as well as each step of the process to overhaul the U.S. tax system. As part of that effort, he secured an exclusive interview with house Speaker Paul Ryan on the details of the GOP tax bill on the day it was first released.

Mattingly was the CNN correspondent who worked on the Multi-Touch Collaboration Wall, nicknamed the "Magic Wall" in the overnight hours of the televised live coverage of the 2020 United States presidential election. He was subsequently promoted to Senior White House correspondent for the incoming Biden administration on January 11, 2021. He succeeded Kaitlan Collins as CNN's Chief White House correspondent in November 2022 when Collins moved to CNN This Morning and succeeded Collins again as a co-anchor of This Morning in August 2023.

CNN This Morning was cancelled in February 2024; CNN CEO Mark Thompson stated that Mattingly would retain a New York-based position.

On February 28, 2024, CNN named Mattingly as the network's new chief domestic correspondent. He was once again assigned to cover Donald Trump's presidential campaign, and also covered special political events such as the 2024 nominating conventions.

== Personal life ==
Mattingly and his wife, Chelsea, married in December 2010. They have four children.
