= CNN Republican Town Hall with Donald Trump =

2023 American television interview

- Genre: Television interview
- Presented by: Kaitlan Collins
- Starring: Donald Trump
- Country of origin: United States
- Original language: English

Production
- Production locations: Saint Anselm College, Goffstown, New Hampshire
- Running time: 62 minutes

Original release
- Network: CNN
- Release: May 10, 2023

The CNN Republican Town Hall with Donald Trump is a 2023 television interview hosted by journalist Kaitlan Collins that featured former president and then-presidential candidate Donald Trump. It aired on May 10, 2023, on CNN.

== Background ==
Donald Trump had been a candidate for the 2024 presidential election. Trump previously served as president from 2017 to 2021.

== Production ==
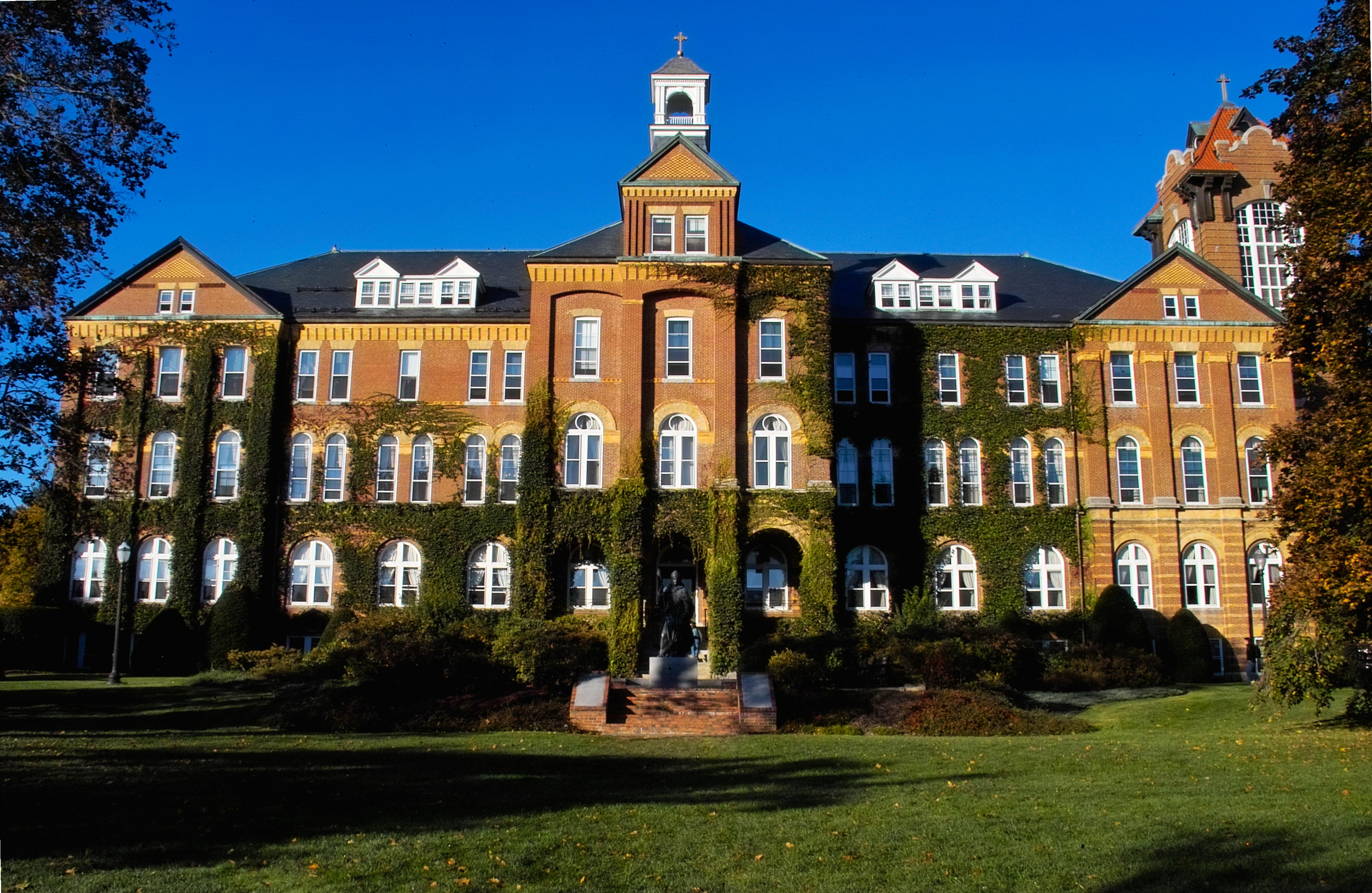
CNN Republican Town Hall with Donald Trump was filmed at Saint Anselm College in New Hampshire.

The town hall in New Hampshire was moderated by Kaitlan Collins, the co-host of CNN This Morning with Poppy Harlow. It was broadcast on CNN on May 10, 2023, a day after a jury ruled Trump was liable for sexual assault and defamation in E. Jean Carroll vs. Donald J. Trump, awarding the plaintiff—journalist E. Jean Carroll—with US$5 million for an encounter Trump had with her in a luxury department store dressing room in 1996. The town hall had been Trump's first appearance on the network since 2016.

The interview was conducted live from the private Benedictine liberal arts college Saint Anselm College in Goffstown, New Hampshire. With regards to its location, New Hampshire's presidential primary is the first in the United States. Saint Anselm College has hosted presidential candidates for decades. The audience was made up of Republicans and undecided voters; in New Hampshire, voters may declare themselves as "undeclared", of which the state's undeclared voters make up a key voting bloc.

== Content ==
The interview mentioned the investigation into Trump's handling of government documents and the FBI search of Mar-a-Lago. While Collins pointed out that Biden—whose home was also searched when classified documents were discovered at the Penn Biden Center—did not defy a subpoena, Trump interrupted her as Collins asked for him to answer the question. Trump then called her a "nasty person". Trump also promoted falsehoods on various topics, including the legitimacy of the 2020 presidential election, the January 6 Capitol attack and aid provided to Ukraine during Russia's invasion.

The interview occurred the day after a New York jury found Trump liable for sexual assault and defamation against E. Jean Carroll. During the interview, Trump called Carroll's account of the assault "fake" and "made up," and he referred to her as a "wack job." In response to Trump's comments, Carroll filed a motion with the Southern District of New York seeking an additional $10 million in damages from Trump for defamation. The court granted the motion, and the second defamation trial had been scheduled for January 15, 2024.

== Reception ==
=== Political reaction ===
The Democratic National Committee (DNC) planned its most aggressive rapid response effort in preparing for the town hall.

Chris Jankowski, the chief executive of Never Back Down, a political action committee aligned to 2024 Republican presidential candidate Ron DeSantis, said that the town hall was a "true marriage of equals", in that Trump had "lost his luster" and resorted to appearing on a network that had "lost its ratings".

=== Analysis ===
CNN's Kristen Holmes wrote that the town hall was a "broader and more traditional campaign strategy", straying away from the Trump campaign's large rallies.

=== Media organizations ===
Mainstream media organizations widely criticized the event, which came the day after Trump was found liable for sexually abusing and defaming author E. Jean Carroll.

A New York Times headline said, "Trump's Falsehoods and Bluster Overtake CNN Town Hall," while Slate called it "breathtakingly ill-conceived". The Wall Street Journal ran the headline, "Trump Mocks Sexual Abuse Case, Repeats False 2020 Election Claims at CNN Town Hall." CNBC reported, "Trump pushes false election claims, mocks E. Jean Carroll to applause during CNN town hall."

Michael Fanone, a former Washington, D.C. police officer involved with the January 6, 2021 Capitol attack, wrote in Rolling Stone, "CNN Is Hosting a Town Hall for a Guy Who Tried to Get Me Killed. Donald Trump tried to end American democracy. Why is CNN throwing him a rehabilitation party?"
