= MS NOW criticisms and controversies =

Controversies involving network MS NOW

MS NOW (known as MSNBC until November 2025) is a news and political commentary organization that has been the focus of several controversies. It has been accused by academics, media figures, political figures, and watchdog groups of having various biases in their news coverage as well as more general views of a liberal bias. Most of these controversies took place during the 2015–2024 era.

== Controversies ==
=== Assertions of liberal bias ===
Commentators have described MSNBC as having a bias towards left-leaning politics and the Democratic Party. In November 2007, a New York Times article stated that MSNBC's prime-time lineup is tilting more to the left. Washington Post media analyst Howard Kurtz has stated that the channel's evening lineup "has clearly gravitated to the left in recent years and often seems to regard itself as the antithesis of Fox News". In 2011, Salon.com noted that "MSNBC's prime-time lineup is now awash in progressive politics."

That same year, Politico referred to MSNBC as "left-leaning". In reference to changes in the channel's evening programming, senior vice president of NBC News Phil Griffin said that "It happened naturally. There isn't a dogma we're putting through. There is a 'Go for it.'"

A study conducted on media bias during the 2008 presidential election found that "A positive tone pervaded (on MSNBC) coverage of candidates from both parties. Nearly half (47%) of the stories about Democratic candidates were positive, vs. 19% negative and 34% neutral. Coverage of Republican candidates was not quite as rosy but still more stories were positive (38%) than neutral (33%) or negative (30%)."

In the February 2008 issue of Men's Journal magazine, an MSNBC interviewee quoted a senior executive who said that liberal commentator Keith Olbermann "runs MSNBC" and that "because of his success, he's in charge" of the channel. The New York Times has called Olbermann MSNBC's "most recognizable face". In September 2008, MSNBC stated that they were removing both Olbermann and Chris Matthews as live political event anchors, and replacing them with David Gregory, due to growing criticism that they were "too opinionated to be seen as neutral in the heat of the presidential campaign".

Olbermann continued to broadcast Countdown both before and after the presidential and vice-presidential debates, and both Matthews and Olbermann joined Gregory on the channel's election night coverage. In September 2009, a Pew Research Poll showed that Democrats were much more likely than Republicans to rate the channel favorably and Republicans were much more likely than Democrats to see MSNBC unfavorably.

On November 13, 2009, in the days leading up to the release of 2008 Republican vice-presidential candidate Sarah Palin's book "Going Rogue", MSNBC's Dylan Ratigan used photoshopped pictures of Palin on the channel's Morning Meeting program. Ratigan apologized a few days later stating, "I want to apologize to Governor Palin and all of our viewers. On Friday, in a very misguided attempt to have some fun in advance of Sarah Palin's upcoming book Going Rogue, our staff mistakenly used some clearly photoshopped images of Ms. Palin without any acknowledgment."

In October 2010, MSNBC began using the tagline "lean forward", which was described by some media outlets, including msnbc.com, as the network embracing its politically progressive identity.

=== Assertions of pro-Obama bias ===
Some Democratic Party supporters, most notably Pennsylvania Governor Ed Rendell and Bill Clinton advisor Lanny Davis, criticized MSNBC during and after the 2008 Democratic primaries, as covering Barack Obama more favorably than Hillary Clinton. A study done by the Project for Excellence in Journalism showed that MSNBC had less negative coverage of Obama (14% of stories vs. 29% in the press overall) and more negative stories about Republican presidential candidate John McCain (73% of its coverage vs. 57% in the press overall).

MSNBC's on-air slogan during the week of the 2008 presidential election, "The Power of Change", was criticized as being overtly similar to Obama's campaign slogan of "Change". Following the 2008 presidential election, conservative talk-show host, John Ziegler worked on a documentary called Media Malpractice. ... How Obama Got Elected, which was very critical of the media, especially MSNBC's role, in the election. While promoting the documentary, he engaged in an on-air dispute with MSNBC news anchor Contessa Brewer, on how the media, especially MSNBC, had portrayed Sarah Palin.

After Chris Matthews and Keith Olbermann made controversial on-air comments during the 2008 Republican National Convention, NBC News correspondent David Gregory replaced them, but Matthews and Olbermann continued working as analysts. On November 4–5, Matthews teamed with Rachel Maddow, Eugene Robinson, Gregory, and Olbermann to cover the presidential election.

During MSNBC's coverage of the Potomac primary, Matthews said of presidential candidate Barack Obama, "I have to tell you, you know, it's part of reporting this case, this election, the feeling most people get when they hear Barack Obama's speech. My, I felt this thrill going up my leg. I mean, I don't have that too often."

This led many on the right to assert that both he and MSNBC were biased toward Obama.

=== Donahue cancellation ===
[Donahue presents a] difficult public face for NBC in a time of war ... He seems to delight in presenting guests who are anti-war, anti-Bush and skeptical of the administration's motives.

— NBC News internal study

Phil Donahue's 2002 program Donahue was canceled in late February 2003 during the buildup to the Iraq War. Despite earlier statements tying the cancellation to low ratings, Donahue was MSNBC's highest rated show that month.

A leaked NBC internal study revealed that the studio was concerned that Donahue would act as "a home for the liberal antiwar agenda at the same time that our competitors are waving the flag at every opportunity".

=== Michael Savage dismissal ===
During the spring and early summer of 2003, MSNBC featured a weekend talk show hosted by conservative radio host Michael Savage. In July of that year, Savage responded to a prank caller on his show by calling him a "pig" and a "sodomite", and telling him he "should get AIDS and die". Savage's show was canceled and Savage was fired from the channel shortly afterward (with some reports placing the termination immediately after the episode in question went off air).

=== Don Imus' simulcast show dismissal ===
In early April 2007, Don Imus, whose radio show Imus in the Morning was simulcast on MSNBC, described members of the Rutgers University women's basketball team, as "some nappy-headed hoes". The comments sparked outrage, as many considered them to be racist and sexist. After sponsors began to withdraw advertisements from the show, MSNBC canceled the simulcast. Imus, as well as NBC News, apologized to the Rutgers Basketball team for the remarks.

=== Rise of the New Right documentary ===
In June 2010, a documentary airing on MSNBC and hosted by Chris Matthews titled Rise of the New Right drew significant criticism from conservatives and the Tea Party movement. The documentary features interviews with Dick Armey, the former House Majority Leader, Orly Taitz, a leading figure in the "birther" movement, and radio host Alex Jones. The documentary also showed the Michigan Militia's survival training camp and hit the campaign trail with Kentucky Senatorial candidate Rand Paul.

After the documentary aired, FreedomWorks, which is chaired by Dick Armey, issued a letter calling for a boycott of Dawn and Procter & Gamble, which advertises during Hardball with Chris Matthews.

=== Olbermann suspension and Return to the Air ===
On November 5, 2010, MSNBC President Phil Griffin suspended Olbermann indefinitely without pay for contributing $2,400 (the maximum personal donation limit) to each of three Democratic candidates during the 2010 midterm election cycle. Contributions to political campaigns, under NBC News policy, are not allowed without prior permission. On November 7, 2010, Olbermann posted a thank you message to supporters via Twitter. The same day, MSNBC announced that he would return on the air starting November 9.

Two weeks later, Griffin announced the suspension of Joe Scarborough for the same offense, as the Morning Joe host had donated $4,000 to Republican candidates in Florida. Like Olbermann's suspension, Scarborough's suspension was brief, and he returned to the airwaves on November 24.

=== 2011 Tucson shootings ===
During the news cycle following the 2011 Tucson shooting, conservative talk-radio host Mark Levin threatened to sue Chris Matthews and several other MSNBC commentators who suggested that he might have influenced the shooter, Jared Lee Loughner. Levin also defended Republican politician Sarah Palin from MSNBC punditry linking her political rhetoric to the heated political atmosphere surrounding the killings.

Paul Bond of The Hollywood Reporter wrote "MSNBC was crucial in driving the narrative that the killer was egged on by violent political rhetoric, particularly from Palin". Bond also wrote "even after it was learned that the shooter was an atheist, flag-burning, Bush-hating, 9/11 Truther who enjoyed joking about abortion (not exactly the portrait of a Palin supporter), MSNBC still did not let up on that story line".

=== Mitt Romney video ===
Anchorwoman Andrea Mitchell was caught showing a doctored video clip of GOP presidential candidate Mitt Romney at a rally in Pennsylvania. The edited version features Romney saying how amazing it is to get a custom made sandwich, using a touch screen ordering device at a Wawa convenience store. What viewers didn't see or hear was nearly three minutes of Romney discussing the extensive amount of paperwork faced by an optometrist he'd talked to in trying to get the post office to change his address. He expressed mock amazement at Wawa's efficiency to underscore how the private sector is often more efficient than Government.

=== Romney-Ryan chant video ===
On Morning Joe, a discussion about Romney relying on his running mate Paul Ryan's popularity was begun with a clip from a Romney rally that showed the crowd chanting. In the clip Romney instructs them to chant "Romney-Ryan". According to the subtitle added by the show, they were chanting "Ryan", which along with the introduction to the clip, made it appear that Romney was injecting his own name into a "Ryan" chant. A caller to TheBlaze TV's Pat & Stu said she had been at the rally and they were chanting "Romney".

Reporters who attended the event from the website BuzzFeed, and the New York Times both confirm that the crowd was chanting "Romney", and he added the name of his running mate. In response to criticisms, Joe Scarborough tweeted that they were chanting "Ryan", and that he would "take note of those who link to the lie". Lauren Skowronski, a spokeswoman for Morning Joe, sent out an email stating that, "the tape clip was untouched and was played as it was recorded", though the "Ryan" subscript was clearly added to the clip.

=== Bias against Mitt Romney and for Barack Obama ===
A study by the Pew Research Center's Project for Excellence in Journalism found that MSNBC's coverage of Romney during the final week of the 2012 presidential campaign (68% negative with no positive stories in the sample), was far more negative than the overall press, and even more negative than it had been during October 1 to 28, when 5% was positive and 57% was negative. On the other hand, their coverage of Obama improved in the final week before the presidential election. From October 1 to 28, 33% of stories were positive and 13% negative. During the campaign's final week, 51% of MSNBC's stories were positive while there were no negative stories at all about Obama in the sample.

=== Host Martin Bashir resignation ===
Host Martin Bashir resigned after making a controversial comment about Sarah Palin. On November 15, 2013, Bashir criticized Sarah Palin for comments that she made comparing the Federal debt to slavery. Bashir attempted to counter Palin's comparison by referencing the cruel and barbaric punishment of slaves described by slave overseer Thomas Thistlewood, specifically a punishment called "Derby's dose" which involved forcing slaves to defecate or urinate into the mouth of another slave as punishment. Bashir then concluded by saying "When Mrs. Palin invokes slavery, she doesn't just prove her rank ignorance. She confirms if anyone truly qualified for a dose of discipline from Thomas Thistlewood, she would be the outstanding candidate."

=== Host Melissa Harris-Perry and Mitt Romney's adopted black grandson ===
Political commentator Melissa Harris-Perry and her guest panel, in a look back on 2013 segment on her show, showed a picture of former Republican presidential candidate Mitt Romney and his extended family. Mr. Romney was holding on his knee his adopted grandchild, Kieran Romney, an African-American. Harris-Perry and her guests, including actress Pia Glenn and comedian Dean Obeidallah, joked about coming up with captions for the photo. Glenn sang out, "One of these things is not like the others, one of these things just isn't the same." Obeidallah said, "It sums up the diversity of the Republican Party and the [Republican National Committee], where they have the whole convention and they find the one black person." Afterwards, Harris-Perry issued an apology in a series of Tweets.

=== Biracial Super Bowl Cheerios Ad Tweet ===
On January 29, 2014, a tweet was posted on MSNBC's official Twitter feed suggesting conservatives hate biracial families: "Maybe the right wing will hate it, but everyone else will go awww: the adorable new #Cheerios ad w/ biracial family". Led by conservative blogger and news contributor Michelle Malkin, many conservatives tweeted pictures of their biracial families with the hashtag #myrightwingbiracialfamily. Many criticized the network for its constant race-baiting and desire to spread negative stereotypes, while others pointed back to many similar incidents by the network as part of a disturbing culture.

MSNBC later deleted the tweet, posting a new one with an apology, stating the original tweet did not represent the network's position. MSNBC Executive Editor Richard Wolffe also tweeted that "The Cheerios tweet from @msnbc was dumb, offensive and we've taken it down. That's not who we are at MSNBC". Republican National Committee chairman Reince Priebus sent a letter to the network's president Phil Griffin stating he will encourage all conservatives not to participate on the network until there was a public apology. Griffin apologized a few hours later, stating the person who had posted the tweet had been fired. Priebus accepted the apology, saying they will continue to monitor the network's pattern of unacceptable behavior to see if it actually changes.

=== Cinco de Mayo Celebration ===
On May 5, 2014, during the show "Way Too Early", a segment was done about the historical background of Cinco De Mayo and featured Louis Burgdorf dancing around the set in a sombrero, shaking maracas and drinking tequila, which host Thomas Roberts referred to as "go-go juice". The segment came under quick criticism for its mocking of Mexican heritage and use of false stereotypes. MSNBC apologized the next day, saying there was no intention to be disrespectful and that while the props were planned, Roberts and Burgdorf acted the way they did on their own. The two hosts also apologized, although they partially deflected the blame back at their producers for allowing the segment to begin with.

=== Assertions of serving their own financial interests ===
In his book Medium Blue: The Politics of MSNBC, Michael Arria wrote that the issue is not so much left wing or right wing as MSNBC and other media serving their own financial interests. Arria said that an example of ignoring news that threatens its own financial interests was that MSNBC was silent about the proposed Comcast-Time Warner Cable merger.

=== Comment about Louisiana Governor Bobby Jindal ===
In January 2015, Arsalan Iftikhar of TheMuslimGuy.com was on MSNBC to discuss Republican Louisiana Governor Bobby Jindal's denunciation of supposed Muslim "no-go zones" in London. Iftikhar commented that Jindal, who is Indian-American, "might be trying to scrub some of the brown off his skin" ahead of a possible 2016 presidential run. Host Alex Wagner did not challenge the comment. MSNBC later released a statement saying: "We found this guest's comments offensive and unacceptable and we don't plan on inviting him back."

=== Coverage of Israeli–Palestinian conflict ===
In October 2015, a series of errors plagued MSNBC while covering the ongoing Israeli–Palestinian conflict and added to recurring claims of anti-Israel bias of the network. Ayman Mohyeldin was reporting live from Gaza, where he claimed to have witnessed an unarmed Palestinian man being shot by Israeli police at the Damascus Gate. The anchor in the studio immediately corrected him on-air, as photos and live shots of the crime scene clearly showed that the man was wielding a large knife, and video confirmed police had told him multiple times to stop as he swung it at them. Mohyeldin, who had a history of being critical regarding Israel, attempted to backtrack by claiming everything was moving too quickly for him to concentrate (despite having just been adamant that the man was unarmed). While he had initially claimed to have had a good vantage point of the incident as it unfolded, it was later reported that it did not take place in front of NBC News cameras.

Following the Hamas attack on Israel on October 7, 2023, it was reported by Semafor that a number of Muslim hosts (including Mehdi Hasan, Mohyeldin, and Ali Velshi) were sidelined from covering the war.

=== Coverage of the 2020 Democratic primary ===
On February 2, 2019, NBC ran a story about Tulsi Gabbard, the third office holding Democrat to enter the presidential primaries, claiming that her campaign was benefiting from Russian state media. Specifically, it stated that she had received twice as many mentions on RT, Sputnik News and Russia Insider compared to expected front-runners Bernie Sanders and Joe Biden. The following day, Glenn Greenwald, known for his time with The Guardian and for founding The Intercept criticized the sourcing of the article whose claims were cited to a programmer who tracks troll accounts as a "hobby" and what Greenwald called the "disgraced firm" New Knowledge. The article in The Intercept discussed the fact that New Knowledge admitted to performing a "false flag" operation to discredit former Republican politician Roy Moore — a move which led to the firm's suspension from Facebook and a request for an investigation by Moore's Democratic opponent Doug Jones. Greenwald also condemned one of the original authors Ben Popken for tweeting that "the Kremlin already has a crush on Tulsi Gabbard". Popken subsequently defended New Knowledge against accusations that he called "wild conflation and hyperbole" while Gabbard alleged that NBC was using guilt by association to target her foreign policy stances.

The following March, Yashar Ali, a journalist for The Huffington Post accused Dafna Linzer, a managing editor at MSNBC, of ceding editorial control to the Democratic National Committee. Ali, who planned to announce the locations of the DNC debates in advance of MSNBC, received a call attempting to dissuade him with the phrase "let them make a few phone calls," referring to party leaders. A source quoted by CNN stated that this approach was necessary for any network that has enough of a relationship with the DNC to host its debates.

MSNBC has also received criticism for its treatment of Andrew Yang, who has been excluded from candidate graphics on multiple occasions. On June 9, 2019, MSNBC cited a poll from RealClearPolitics and did not display Yang — who was polling at 8th — yet included a total of 20 candidates. The Daily Wire's Ryan Saavedra called out MSNBC for the omission in a tweet, which was picked up by Fairness and Accuracy in Reporting (FAIR). On November 18, 2019, MSNBC once again cited a poll (the November 17 DM Register/CNN poll) and again did not display Yang among the 11 top polling candidates even though Yang was tied at 6th place. MSNBC received further criticism when part of Yang's speech at the Poor People's Campaign Presidential Forum was cut from the broadcast for a live discussion with the correspondent; however, the footage has since been removed. In November 2019, Yang's campaign manager dismissed an apology by MSNBC for leaving Yang off of an infographic, which according to a compilation from Yang supporter and UBI writer Scott Santens, was the 15th time in the campaign cycle MSNBC or its related networks had excluded Yang.

During the November debate hosted by MSNBC Yang received the least speaking time of any candidate, and was not given any time to speak for the first 32 minutes of the 2 hour debate. Yang's short total speaking time and the long period of time before he was brought in sparked accusations from critics of MSNBC suppressing the speaking time of Yang and other outsider candidates. The incident sparked protests outside of the debate studio from Yang's supporters, who chanted "M-S-N-B-C, hands off our democracy!". On November 23, 2019, following the November debate, Yang publicly rejected a request to appear on MSNBC unless the network would "apologize on-air, discuss and include our campaign consistent with our polling, and allow surrogates from our campaign as they do other candidates'"

=== Alison Morris report on Kobe Bryant's death ===
On January 26, 2020—as MSNBC reported on the death of retired basketball player Kobe Bryant—Alison Morris quickly called Bryant's former team, the Los Angeles Lakers, what sounded like "the Los Angeles Niggers", immediately self-correcting to "Los Angeles Lakers". Morris herself claims to have verbally stumbled and said "Los Angeles Nakers", claiming she had stuttered, combining the words "Knicks" and "Lakers" into "Nakers", rather than the racial slur.

The incident caused many people to accuse her of being racist, which Morris quickly denied. The controversy led to the starting of a petition to have Morris fired, which was signed by over 184,000 participants.

=== Kyle Rittenhouse trial ban ===
On November 18, 2021, Kenosha County Judge Bruce Schroeder banned MSNBC and everyone affiliated with the network from the courthouse for the duration of the trial of Kyle Rittenhouse. The judge explained that on the previous night, Kenosha police noticed a car following the jury bus, and stopped it when it ran a red light. Schroeder identified the driver in court as "James J. Morrison, who claimed he was a producer with NBC News, employed by MSNBC" and that Morrison alleged to police that he had been instructed by his supervisor, New York-based producer Irene Byon, to follow the jury bus. Police took Morrison into custody on suspicion of photographing jurors, but after they found no pictures of jurors, he was "issued traffic related citations" and released.

"This is a very serious matter and I don't know what the ultimate truth of it is," Schroeder said. "But absolutely it would go without much thinking that someone who is following the jury bus, that's an extremely serious matter and it will be referred to the proper authorities." In a statement the same day, NBC News promised to fully cooperate with any investigation of the matter. The network referred to the vehicle driver as a "freelancer" and denied that he intended to photograph jurors or contact them during deliberations.

== Criticism of individuals ==
- Chris Matthews: Matthews, host of the MSNBC TV show Hardball with Chris Matthews has made many disparaging comments about women in politics over his career, including Hillary Clinton, Sarah Palin and Melania Trump, often based on their appearance or private lives.
- Alec Baldwin: On November 14, 2013, Baldwin, host of Up Late with Alec Baldwin, allegedly called a reporter who was following him a "cock-sucking fag". Baldwin would be suspended the next day and was fired on November 23, 2013.
- Joy Reid: In 2018, Reid's old blog was exposed for containing homophobic posts. At first, Reid blamed hackers even though the Internet Archive, which hosts archived web pages, denied this. Reid finally apologized after BuzzFeed found further archived posts in which Reid promoted a 9/11 conspiracy theory, and an image of John McCain photoshopped onto the body of mass murderer Seung-Hui Cho. Meghan McCain, daughter of John McCain, called the post "beyond disgusting and disgraceful", and Reid again apologized, this time not mentioning anything about "hackers".
- Joe Scarborough: On January 7, 2021, Scarborough, co-host of Morning Joe, demanded the arrest of Donald Trump, Rudy Giuliani and Donald Trump Jr. for insurrection, following the January 6 United States Capitol attack, criticizing law enforcement's response to the rioters.
- Mehdi Hasan: During the Gaza war in 2023, Hasan has gained substantial attention due to his outspoken opinions and viewing techniques. Hasan has also been challenging Israeli officials in response to the war following his views as anti-Israel. MSNBC later announced in a revamped programming lineup that it would be cancelling both his MSNBC and Peacock shows. Hasan later left the network in January 2024.
- Viktor Orbán: MSN has referred to the Hungarian Prime Minister as a "dictator" on numerous occasions, since he was re-elected in 2010. However, others dispute the label of dictator, emphasizing that Orbán has been democratically reelected as the Hungarian Prime-Minister 3 times in a row (he has served 5 terms total with a long-break between 2002 and 2010). U.S. conservatives, in particular, have expressed admiration for Orbán’s leadership style, rejecting claims of autocracy.

== See also ==
- Al Jazeera controversies and criticism
- BBC controversies
- CNN controversies
- Fox News controversies
- CBS News controversies and criticism
- List of The New York Times controversies
- Military–industrial complex
