= CBS News controversies and criticism =

CBS News, the news division of the television and radio broadcaster CBS, has faced several notable controversies throughout its history. This includes the resignation of CBS News president Fred Friendly in 1966 to protest against Vietnam War coverage, the 2004 Killian documents controversy involving Dan Rather presenting improperly verified documents, accusations of bias and plagiarism, and several instances of misrepresented or erroneously attributed footage.

== 1960s ==
In 1964, Rep. Jimmy Utt (R-CA) filed a libel suit against CBS regarding a CBS Reports "Case History of a Rumor" program. He claimed the defendants had "'entrapped' him into giving a television interview that turned out to be a 'cross examination' by Roger Mudd, who acted as 'prosecutor, judge, and jury.'" The case was dismissed. Utt died in office in 1970 and was succeeded by John G. Schmitz.

On February 15, 1966, CBS News president Fred Friendly resigned in protest after the network declined to show hearings of the Senate Foreign Relations Committee regarding the expanding Vietnam War in favor of reruns of I Love Lucy. The decision, made by the network's vice president of broadcasting, John M. Schneider, specifically related to the testimony of George F. Kennan not being shown, in contrast to NBC News, which was showing it live.

== Subsidization of Haitian invasion ==
In 1971, the FCC and the House Commerce Committee issued reports claiming that CBS News financially subsidized Project Nassau, a planned 1966 invasion of Haiti intended to overthrow then-dictator François Duvalier; CBS News allegedly became involved in the plot in order to shoot the invasion for a television documentary. However, the participants in the invasion were arrested by the FBI before it could be carried out. In a deposition, Atlanta Journal reporter Tom Dunkin claimed that Jay McMullen, a CBS producer, told him that he had "spent a lot of time and money on this project and had nothing to show for it." CBS was denounced by Vice President Spiro Agnew, who accused the network of disseminating "self-serving propaganda".

== Alleged conservative bias ==
Following editorial changes by owner Larry Ellison and editor-in-chief Bari Weiss that same year, CBS News faced allegations of a conservative, pro-Trump, pro-MAGA bias. In October 2025, Bari Weiss was appointed editor-in-chief of CBS News. This announcement was interpreted by critics as a mark of the organization shifting rightward and more pro-Israel in response to the Trump era, and was likewise praised by Trump himself. Federal Communications Commission chair Brendan Carr, speaking of approval of the Paramount-Skydance merger, stated in an interview to The Wall Street Journal that "The new owners of CBS came in and said, 'It's time for a change'" and that they said "'We're going to reorient it towards getting rid of bias.'" Carr added: "At the end of the day, that's what made the difference for us." In 2025, CBS News President Wendy McMahaon and 60 Minutes executive producer Bill Owens resigned; Owens stated his departure was due to a loss of journalistic independence.

As the FCC required the appointment of an ombudsman to monitor "bias" at CBS News for agency approval of the Paramount–Skydance merger, Paramount Skydance CEO David Ellison appointed Kenneth R. Weinstein (the former CEO of the Hudson Institute, a conservative foreign policy think tank) to the position in September 2025. After the appointments of Weiss and Weinstein as editor-in-chief and ombudsman respectively, the head of the Standards and Practices department for CBS News resigned in October 2025.

In early 2026, under newly appointed editor-in-chief Bari Weiss, CBS Evening News' Tony Dokoupil introduced "5 simple values", a set of principles that inform how the show presents news. The principles, which espoused American-centric values, led to increased speculation that Weiss's appointment was aimed at gaining approval from MAGA supporters, including Donald Trump. Amid the editorial changes being undertaken by Bari Weiss, new CBS Evening News anchor Tony Dokoupil released a promo promising that the newscast planned to remain objective and editorially independent from politicians, advertisers, and corporate interests (including those of CBS itself). He argued that news media coverage at CBS on topics such as the Iraq war, COVID lockdowns, Hillary Clinton's emails, and Hunter Biden's laptop was "skewed" in favor of "political and academic elites and away from the concerns of normal people". CBS reported its 38-page handbook of principles was reduced to "5 simple values", of which one was "we love America". Variety reported the pro-America pledge "reinforce[d] speculation that Ellison put Weiss in charge of CBS News in an effort to boost its appeal among MAGA supporters generally — and with President Trump specifically".

In April 2026, David Ellison and CBS News' Bari Weiss; Norah O'Donnell; Tom Cibrowski, CBS News president; Makan Delrahim, Paramount's chief legal officer; Jan Crawford, the network's chief legal correspondent; chief White House correspondent Nancy Cordes; and Weijia Jiang, White House correspondent and president of the White House Correspondents' Association; all attended a party "honoring" Donald Trump and the First Amendment with Trump, acting attorney general Todd Blanche, Secretary of State Marco Rubio and Stephen Miller, a deputy White House chief of staff. The DOJ's antitrust division was in the process of reviewing a merger by Ellison to acquire Warner Bro. Discovery which would give him ownership of CNN. The New York Times reported that party invitations sent to guests said the event was for "honoring the Trump White House" and that several CBS News journalists expressed surprise and consternation over the dinner, and worried that the event had the "potential to create a perception of coziness between the news division and the Trump administration".

== Alleged liberal bias ==
In his 2001 book Bias: A CBS Insider Exposes How the Media Distort the News, former CBS News correspondent Bernard Goldberg extensively criticized Dan Rather's management of CBS News and what he claimed was Rather's combative efforts to skew the network's coverage.

== 2004 Killian documents ==
On September 8, 2004, two months before the 2004 presidential election, 60 Minutes II broadcast a report by Dan Rather claiming that a series of memos had surfaced criticizing President George W. Bush's service record in the Texas Air National Guard, purportedly discovered in the personnel files of Bush's then-commanding officer, Lt. Col. Jerry B. Killian. However, independent analysis of the documents in question—particularly analysis of their anachronistic typographic conventions—strongly suggested that they were actually forgeries.

Despite initially defending the authenticity of the documents, Rather and CBS eventually admitted that they were misled about how they were obtained; Rather, however, has continued to insist that the documents weren't conclusively proved to be forged. After an internal investigation, CBS dismissed four producers and allegedly hastened Rather's retirement as anchor of the CBS Evening News. Rather filed a $70 million lawsuit against CBS in 2007, claiming that the network and its management had made him a "scapegoat" in the Killian story. In 2009, Rather's lawsuit was dismissed.

== Plagiarism ==
On the April 4, 2007, broadcast of the CBS Evening News, Katie Couric gave a one-minute commentary about the importance of reading. However, it was later discovered that Couric's commentary was substantially lifted from a column by Jeffrey Zaslow in The Wall Street Journal. Despite the personal flavor of the piece—with Couric saying how she still remembered receiving her first library card—it was later determined that a producer had written the commentary instead of Couric, and that she had plagiarized from Zaslow's column. CBS quickly fired the producer and promised changes to its procedures.

== Benghazi incident ==
Steve Kroft, co-editor of 60 Minutes, interviewed Barack Obama immediately following the noted Rose Garden press conference held in response to the 2012 Benghazi attack. CBS withheld significant parts of the interview that confirm the President's refusal to acknowledge the attack as a confirmed act of terror, despite the prominence that arose following the second presidential debate. CBS released the footage just two days before the 2012 United States presidential election.

On 10 March 2014, reporter Sharyl Attkisson resigned from CBS News, citing what she saw as the network's liberal bias, an outsized influence by the network's corporate partners, and a lack of dedication to investigative reporting. In her book Stonewalled, Attkisson also reports about how her computer was hacked, deleting stories about the Benghazi attack.

== Misrepresentation of 2017 Chicago torture incident ==
In January 2017, after the events of the 2017 Chicago torture incident took place, CBS Radio News reported, "The viral video of a beating and knife attack in Chicago suggests the assault had racial overtones. CBS's Dean Reynolds tells us the victim is described as a mentally challenged teenager. In the video he is choked and repeatedly called the n-word. His clothes are slashed and he is terrorized with a knife. His alleged captors repeatedly reference Donald Trump." This description, which implied that a black victim was tortured by white Trump supporters, was criticized by conservatives, including Jack Armstrong and Joe Getty at the San Francisco CBS Radio News affiliate KCBS (AM).

== Misattributed footage of a hospital during the COVID-19 pandemic ==
On March 25, 2020, the CBS This Morning news program aired a segment described in a teaser called "Desperation in New York as coronavirus cases there continue to skyrocket", which featured a clip of hospital personnel, equipment, and patients after a short clip featuring Deborah Birx, who was at the time serving as the White House Coronavirus Response Coordinator. However, the footage shown was actually that of a hospital in Bergamo, Italy aired three days earlier by Sky News and not from New York. CBS News later acknowledged the error, with a spokesperson from CBS attributing the error to "an editing mistake." and added that "We took immediate steps to remove it from all platforms and shows." One week later, CBS News used a short clip of the same Italian footage while referencing COVID-19 cases in Pennsylvania.

== Inside CECOT ==
In December 2025, the 60 Minutes segment "Inside CECOT" on the Terrorism Confinement Center by correspondent Sharyn Alfonsi was postponed just before the scheduled broadcast within the US, generating widespread criticism in the US. Alfonsi stated in an e-mail to colleagues that "our story was screened five times and cleared by both CBS attorneys and Standards and Practices. It is factually correct" and "In my view, pulling it now—after every rigorous internal check has been met is not an editorial decision, it is a political one."

Despite the last minute attempt to stop the broadcast, the segment continued to be released per schedule via a Global Television Network streaming service and was downloaded and distributed across other Internet services despite CBS News efforts to prevent distribution using DMCA take down notices.

Some news commentators stated that killing the story was part of a larger shift from David Ellison.

== Firing of Scott Pelley ==
On June 2, 2026, Pelley was fired by CBS News, following his strong criticism of CBS News editor-in-chief Bari Weiss and newly-named 60 Minutes executive producer Nick Bilton during a contentious staff meeting. Relations between Pelley and Weiss had been tense for months, long before Bilton took the helm in late May 2026. During the meeting, Pelley had accused Weiss of "murdering" the show, and told Bilton that he would "never be welcome" there.

When CBS fired Pelley, Bilton wrote a cover letter, which was obtained by The New York Times. Bilton stated as follows: "Your antipathy to the future of the show has come through loud and clear. And I have heard you. I therefore write on behalf of CBS News, Inc. ('CBS') to inform you that your employment with CBS is terminated for cause effective immediately." The next day, Weiss said, "I'm only interested in working in a newsroom that is built on trust and mutual respect." That night on the CBS Evening News, anchor Tony Dokoupil described Pelley as a "journalist who valued truth at all costs".

In response, Pelley issued a statement accusing the new CBS leadership of instructing him to insert falsehoods into a political story, and to include assertions that were not verified – instructions he says he ignored. "The collapse of values at the top has become untenable. The leadership of 60 Minutes is no longer recognizable. The principles I hold dear are gone, and so I must leave as well," Pelley wrote. In a later interview with the New York Times, Pelley clarified that the story CBS management intervened in was a report about the 2026 ICE protests in Minnesota, and that the falsehood CBS had asked for was to describe protester Renée Good as driving her car toward the officer who killed her, which Pelley said contradicts video evidence of the event.

== See also ==
- Al Jazeera controversies and criticism
- BBC controversies
- CNN controversies
- Fox News controversies
- MSNBC controversies
- The New York Times controversies
- Media bias in the United States
