= Andrew Kaczynski =

American journalist

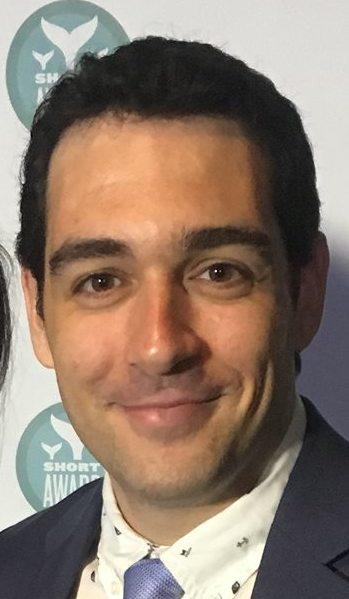
- Kaczynski in 2017
- Born: November 30, 1989 (age 36); Cleveland, Ohio, U.S.
- Education: Ohio University (attended); St. John's University (attended)
- Spouse: Rachel Ensign
- Children: 3

Andrew Kaczynski (born November 30, 1989) is an American journalist and a political reporter for CNN. He became well known in 2011 by posting old video clips of politicians, often of them making statements contrary to their current political positions, to YouTube. He was described as "the [2012] Republican primaries' most influential amateur opposition researcher".

He was hired by BuzzFeed in 2012. He has appeared on MSNBC, Fox News, CNN, NPR, PBS, and C-SPAN. On October 3, 2016, Kaczynski announced he was leaving BuzzFeed and joining CNN.

== Early life ==
Kaczynski grew up in the suburbs of Cleveland. His father Stephen served in the Army and was a lawyer at the firm Jones Day and his mother Theresa was a stay-at-home mother. His parents were raised in New York City and both his grandparents served in the city's police and fire departments. He is of Polish and Arbëreshë (or Italo-Albanian) heritage.

Kaczynski attended Benedictine High School in Cleveland. Following high school, he attended college at Ohio University for two years, but got involved with political reporting, and then transferred to St. Johns University to study early American history. He enrolled in online courses to meet his degree requirement, but did not graduate.

He has worked as an intern for the Republican National Committee, and was an intern in 2011 in the office of Congressman Bob Turner.

Kaczynski got his start by e-mailing reporters' tip boxes with clips he found of politicians contradicting themselves.

== Career ==
=== Work at Buzzfeed ===
Kaczynski began working for Buzzfeed at the start of 2012 while he was still studying at St. Johns University. In March 2012, Kaczynski uncovered numerous clips of Mitt Romney supporting an individual mandate, contradicting his then-current campaign position. He also uncovered a clip of Barack Obama protesting at Harvard while at law school over a lack of faculty diversity.

In November 2013, Kaczynski reported that Kentucky Senator Rand Paul had plagiarized sections of a speech he gave in June 2013 on immigration from the Wikipedia article of the movie Stand and Deliver. Kaczynski subsequently reported Paul's 2012 book Government Bullies also contained passages that were plagiarized from articles from The Heritage Foundation and from the Cato Institute. Further reports by Kaczynski revealed another four instances of plagiarism from an article by Case Western Reserve University professor Jonathan H. Adler and Pacific Legal Foundation attorney Timothy Sandefur. Another section of the book was discovered to be plagiarized from an article written in Forbes Magazine. The next year, Kaczynski continued with a series of articles chronicling politicians' plagiarism. Kaczynski found more than a dozen examples of politicians running for office in 2014 copying their plans and issues pages verbatim from other candidates. In January 2017, Kaczynski reported that Monica Crowley had plagiarized large sections of her 2012 book What The (Bleep) Just Happened. The publisher, HarperCollins, announced they would stop selling the book. The Trump Administration tapped Crowley to serve as senior director of strategic communications for the National Security Council. In May 2017, he reported that Sheriff David Clarke had plagiarized portions of his master's thesis.

Following the Boston Marathon bombings of 2013, he played a role in spreading unsubstantiated misinformation about the identities of the suspected bombers when he retweeted false reports made by Reddit user Greg Hughes.

In 2015, Politico reported Kaczynski was leading internal opposition research at BuzzFeed looking to dig up dirt on politicians. NPR reported Kaczynski's team dug up clips of Donald Trump saying he supported – despite statements to the contrary – the Iraq War; a clip of Hillary Clinton referring to some children as "super predators"; a video of Ben Carson saying he believed the pyramids were used to store grain; and a video of Bernie Sanders proclaiming his support for Fidel Castro and the Sandinistas in Nicaragua. Kaczynski subsequently found clips of Donald Trump supporting the 2011 American intervention in Libya, the toppling of Egyptian president Hosni Mubarak, and pushing for U.S. action to protect Iranian protesters. Clips Kaczynski found of Donald Trump on the Howard Stern Show were used in both Democratic and Republican attack ads against Trump and as the basis of a question in the first general election Presidential debate of 2016. During the U.S. campaign for president in 2016, Kaczynski brought to attention a statement by the chairman of the American Nazi Party in support of Republican candidate Donald Trump on the grounds that "if Trump does win ... it's going to be a real opportunity for people like white nationalists."

=== Work at CNN ===
On October 3, 2016, Kaczynski and his team announced they were leaving BuzzFeed and joining CNN.

In January 2017, Kaczynski surfaced audio of Donald Trump's nominee for secretary of labor, Andrew Puzder, describing the employees hired at his restaurants as the "best of the worst". Puzder later withdrew due to other reasons, and did not join the administration.

On July 4, 2017, Kaczynski controversially reported he used "identifying information" to find the identity of a Reddit user who created an anti-CNN video meme President Donald Trump tweeted two days prior, using a Facebook search to find them. The Reddit user had a history of racist, anti-Muslim, and antisemitic postings. Kaczynski reported the creator's identity would be withheld by CNN, since the creator was a private citizen, and because he had issued an "extensive apology". CNN executive editor of standards, Rick Davis, then added the disclaimer "CNN reserves the right to publish his identity, should any of that change". The disclaimer was subject to criticism that it created the appearance of blackmail, while, conversely, the article was also criticized for not revealing the subject's name. Kaczynski stated that the line was "misinterpreted", and that the user said that he was not threatened prior to his apology.

In 2017 and 2018, a number of Trump administration officials such as Carl Higbie, Jamie Johnson, Todd Johnson, Christine Bauserman, and Brute Bradford resigned over controversial comments Kaczynski uncovered.

In March 2019, Kaczynski reported on a 1993 Senate speech in which Joe Biden referred to "predators on our streets" and proposed that new legislation was required to utilize prisons to remove them from society.

In September 2024, Kacynski and Em Steck reported that the Republican nominee for the 2024 North Carolina gubernatorial election, Mark Robinson, had made comments on a porn site named Nude Africa, where he made numerous racist comments such as referring to himself as a "black NAZI", and admitting to "peeping" into a women's gym shower when he was a teenager.

During the 2024 presidential campaign, Kacynski reported on Democratic nominee Kamala Harris's responses to a 2019 ACLU presidential candidate survey, including an answer indicating that Harris "supported taxpayer funding of gender transition surgeries for detained immigrants and federal prisoners." This stance would come into sharper focus following the Trump campaign's October "Kamala is for they/them" advertisements, which the campaign spent more money on airing than any other in the election.

== Recognition ==
Time named Kaczynski's Twitter feed one of "The 140 Best Twitter Feeds of 2013", one of ten in the Politics category. Slate political reporter Dave Weigel called him "the Oppenheimer of archival video research".

In 2013, he was listed on the Daily Beast website's "Beast Best" awards for his Twitter Feed. In 2014, New York magazine named him the 13th most influential Tweeter in New York City.

Politico named him one of the breakout stars of the 2016 election. In 2017, he was nominated for the Shorty Award for Best Journalist. In 2018, Kaczynski was named to Forbes's 30 Under 30 Media list.

== Personal life ==
Kaczynski is married to Wall Street Journal banking reporter Rachel Louise Ensign.

On December 25, 2020, Kaczynski announced the death of his nine month old daughter Francesca. She died the day prior after a battle with an atypical teratoid rhabdoid tumor in her brain. In the year following her death, Kaczynski started the Team Beans Infant Brain Tumor Fund at Dana–Farber Cancer Institute and raised more than $1,700,000 for infant brain tumor research. In April 2021, he raised more than $240,000 by running the Boston Marathon.

Kaczynski's second daughter was born on January 27, 2022.

He was described as a moderate Republican in a New York magazine profile. It was later revealed Kaczynski was misquoted, and called himself "a political moderate".

Kaczynski is a New York Yankees, Cleveland Browns and Brooklyn Nets fan. At 19, Kaczynski had a bout of pancreatitis, leading him to eschew smoking and alcohol.
