= Octavia Nasr =

Lebanese-American journalist (born 1966)

- اوكتافيا نصر
- Born: 13 March 1966 (age 60); Beirut, Lebanon
- Education: MA Communication
- Occupations: Scholar, Yogi, Journalist
- Notable credit: The Identity of Yoga: Contemporary Vs. Traditional Yogic Discourse (MA Thesis)

Octavia Nasr (Arabic: اوكتافيا نصر) (born 13 March 1966) is a Lebanese-American Rhetoric scholar and author whose research focuses on Yoga's identity and ethical code and how they apply to journalism and other fields. Based in Atlanta, Georgia, Nasr currently serves as Journalism Professor and Yoga Editor. She is a certified yoga instructor who teaches in the U.S. and India. She began her journalism career as a war correspondent for Lebanon's LBCI in the 1980s before moving to the US in 1990 and working for CNN in various on-air and off-air roles until her departure in 2010.

== Career ==
Nasr was born and raised in Lebanon in a Christian Maronite family to a Lebanese mother and Palestinian father who was born in Haifa and migrated to Lebanon with his family when he was 8 years old.

She completed her master's degree at Georgia State University in 2022. Her thesis, The Identity of Yoga: Contemporary Vs. Traditional Yogic Discourse, investigates yoga's modern postural identity. She links the truncation of yoga's limbs to teacher training curricula as set by the Yoga Alliance in the U.S. She offers a prescriptive curriculum to preserve yoga's traditional identity while building on its modern postural popularity.

She founded Bridges Media Consulting in 2010 after her departure from CNN. In her role as Principal, she helps broadcasters and individuals be more diverse and make the best use of technology and the federated universe.

As a certified yoga instructor, she teaches and lectures about yoga in the U.S. and India.

At Georgia State University, she serves as GSUTV's Managing Director and Journalism Professor.

For more than 20 years, Nasr covered major stories involving the Middle East, as an on-air and off-air expert for CNN's global platforms. Her work at the network started just after Saddam Hussein’s invasion of Kuwait where she coordinated network coverage of the award-winning Gulf War coverage as part of CNN’s international assignment desk. Nasr won an Overseas Press Club Award in 2002 for CNN's coverage of 9-11 and its aftermath. In 2003, she managed a 15-member Arab desk which coordinated coverage of the Iraq War and was executive producer of CNN's Arab Voices. She received the Edward R. Murrow for Continuing Coverage of the 2006 war in Lebanon.

She is the recipient of the 2006 Excellence in Journalism award from the Lebanese-American Chamber of Commerce and was awarded CNN World Report’s 2003 Achievement Award.

== Fadlallah comments controversy ==
Following the death of Mohammad Hussein Fadlallah on 4 July 2010, Nasr tweeted, "Sad to hear of the passing of Sayyed Mohammad Hussein Fadlallah.. One of Hezbollah's giants I respect a lot..."

Nasr fell victim of an astroturfing attack for this perceived show of sympathy and support for Hezbollah amid claims that her stated position was incompatible with her role at CNN as editor of news on the Middle East.

In response to reactions to her comment, Nasr wrote on 6 July an explanation of what she meant with her tweet.

I used the words "respect" and "sad" because to me as a Middle Eastern woman, Fadlallah took a contrarian and pioneering stand among Shia clerics on woman's rights. He called for the abolition of the tribal system of "honor killing." He called the practice primitive and non-productive. He warned Muslim men that abuse of women was against Islam.

Nasr concluded her statement by saying:

Sayyed Fadlallah. Revered across borders yet designated a terrorist. Not the kind of life to be commenting about in a brief tweet. It's something I deeply regret.

A CNN spokesman responded saying that "CNN regrets any offense her Twitter message caused. It did not meet CNN’s editorial standards." The following day, on 7 July, an internal CNN memo announcing Nasr's departure, CNN International’s senior vice president for newsgathering, Parisa Khosravi, wrote, "We believe that her credibility in her position as senior editor for Middle Eastern affairs has been compromised going forward."

On the Huffington Post, columnist Magda Abu-Fadil wrote about coordinated online efforts to protest Nasr's comments and push for her dismissal. In a 2012 interview, Nasr noted, "Without an upfront commitment from the employer to stand by and protect employees from astroturfing and negative publicity, my advice to employees is not to use social media on behalf of their employer, period."

=== Reaction ===
Articles and commentaries following Nasr's sacking expressed shock and dismay from the journalism community. Thomas Friedman was among many who were troubled by the decision, writing in The New York Times that the decision undermined the network's credibility and sent the wrong signal to young people entering journalism. He wrote "I find Nasr's firing troubling." He questioned CNN's reaction by asking, "To begin with, what has gotten into us? One misplaced verb now and within hours you can have a digital lynch mob chasing after you—and your bosses scrambling for cover". Glen Greenwald in Salon.com wrote, "That message spawned an intense fit of protest from Far Right outlets, Thought Crime enforcers, and other neocon precincts, and CNN quickly (and characteristically) capitulated to that pressure by firing her." Greenwald referred to Fadlallah as "one of the Shiite world's most beloved religious figures", highlighting how the world viewed him including many in the west as shown in the Time Magazine's choice of Man of the year 2010 Fond Farewell. On the other hand, agenda-driven commentators celebrated. Mediaite's Dan Abrams asked "Can you imagine what would happen to a U.S. journalist expressing admiration for an Al Qaeda leader who had other, better, attributes?" Others expressed concern over what they viewed as similar incidents, most notably Hearst syndicated columnist Helen Thomas retiring under criticism one month earlier.

Media outlets from around the world protested the firing and faulted CNN for its decision. Stephen Walt of NPR called it "a mistake for CNN." Many wrote in support of Nasr and warned that her firing constituted a new trend in the political climate for journalists and journalism covering politically sensitive issues in general, and the Middle East in particular. Those who agreed with CNN's decision stated that it had a right to enforce standards of objectivity in its reporting. Dr. James Zogby, the president of the Arab American Institute, said, "the very public nature of Nasr’s firing was unwise for a network attempting to build a global audience." Describing Nasr as "often the lone voice of reason" at CNN during Middle East crisis coverage, he warned that her firing sends a message "to Arabs around the world that their viewpoint doesn’t matter."

Orthodox Rabbi Shmuley Boteach wrote: "For people like... Nasr..., an imam like Fadlallah who wants to kill Americans and Israelis but who is unexpectedly nice to women has taken a giant leap forward from the Dark Ages, deserving respect and praise. This attitude is, of course, not only deeply amoral and patronizing nonsense but historically false." In contrast, Time Person of the Year 2010 recognized Fadlallah and listed him under "Fond Farewells." Author Thanassis Cambanis, who interviewed Fadlallah for his book A Privilege to Die: Inside Hezbollah's Legions and Their Endless War Against Israel, explained that "by the time of his death (of natural causes), Fadlallah had broken with Hizballah and the toxic legacy of his early edicts." The author goes on to explain that Fadlallah "criticized Iran's clerical rule, supported women's rights and insisted on dialogue with the West." Cambanis concluded that "his passing marks a step backward for reform in the combustible world of Islamist militancy."

Huffington Post article with title "CNN's Octavia Nasr: Another Victim of America's Thought Police" writes: "Since 9/11 America's redline has conflated terrorism and Israel's security, flattening all difference and particularity. As Stephen Walt and John Mearsheimer pointed out, this has dangerous consequences for both the implementation of policy and the policing of public thought (they were called anti-Semites for this)." While The Guardian writes: "Nasr is one of the more high-profile victims of a phenomenon known as "twittercide", comparing the incident with another controversy surrounding death of Fadlallah, namely a tribute to him which came from the UK ambassador to Beirut.

Expressing a contrary opinion, Robert Fisk derided CNN and its credibility over the firing, saying "Poor old CNN goes on getting more cowardly by the hour. That's why no one cares about it any more."

== See also ==
- CNN controversies
