= Don Lemon =

American television journalist (born 1966)

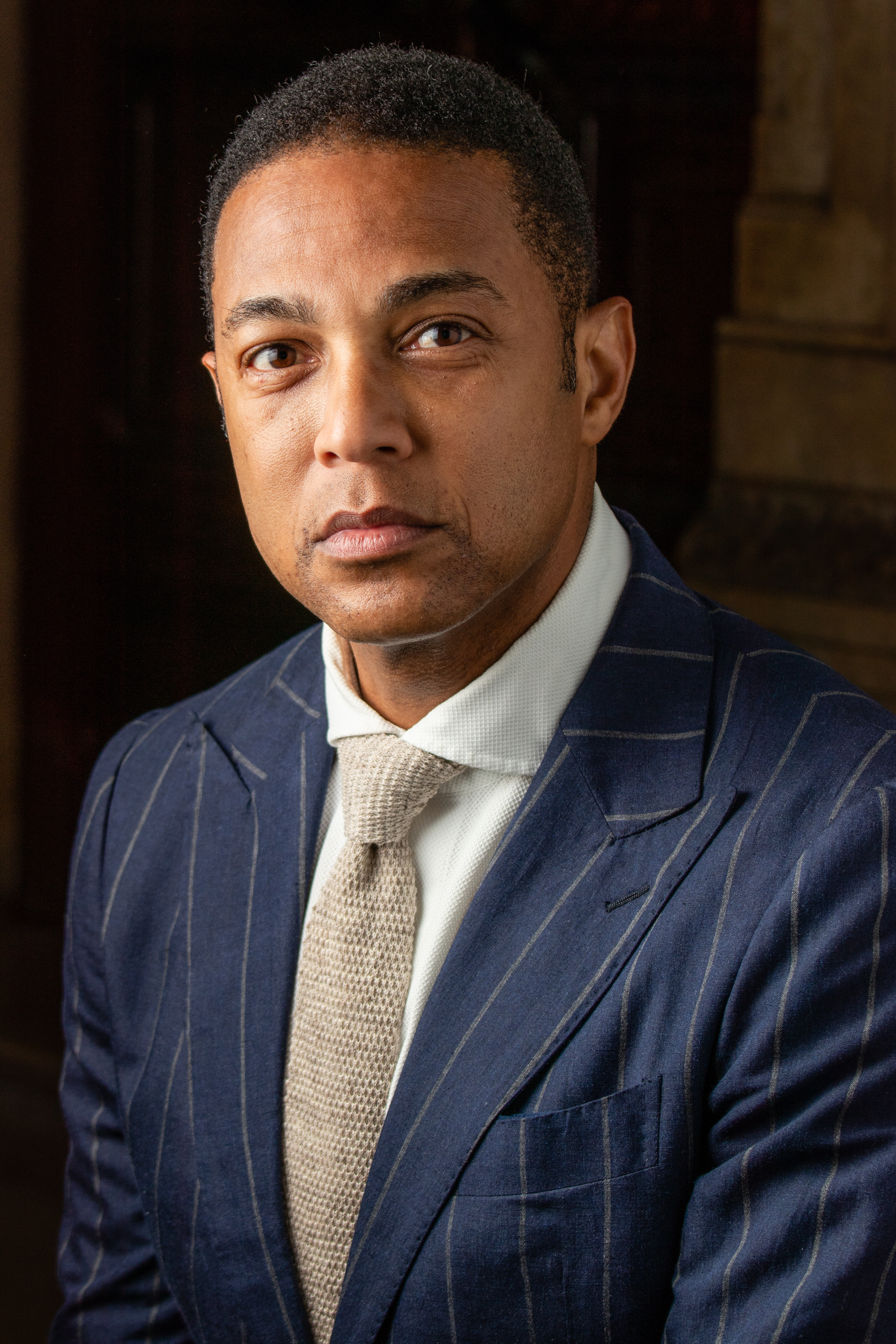
- Lemon in 2018
- Born: Don Renaldo Lemon-Clark; March 1, 1966 (age 60); Baton Rouge, Louisiana, U.S.
- Education: Brooklyn College (BA)
- Occupation: Journalist
- Employer(s): CNN (2006—2023); Independent (2024—present)
- Political party: Independent
- Other political affiliations: Republican (c. 1980s)
- Spouse: Tim Malone (m. 2024)
- Awards: Regional Emmy Award; Edward R. Murrow Award
- Website: donlemon.com

Don Renaldo Lemon-Clark (born March 1, 1966) is an American political commentator and former television journalist best known for being a host on CNN from 2014 until 2023. He anchored weekend news programs on local television stations in Alabama and Pennsylvania during his early days as a journalist. Lemon worked as a news correspondent for NBC on its programming, such as Today and NBC Nightly News. Shortly after leaving CNN, Don Lemon created The Don Lemon Show, which now operates independently and has its own YouTube channel with approximately 1.25 million subscribers as of March 2026.

Lemon is a recipient of an Edward R. Murrow Award in 2002 for his coverage of the capture of the Washington, D.C. snipers. He also received three regional Emmy Awards for his special report on real estate in Chicago and a business feature on Craigslist.

He joined CNN in 2006, also as a correspondent and later achieved prominence as the presenter of Don Lemon Tonight from 2014 to 2022. He was a co-host of CNN This Morning, alongside Kaitlan Collins and Poppy Harlow. He was fired by CNN in April 2023.

== Early life and education ==
Don Renaldo Lemon-Clark was born March 1, 1966, in Baton Rouge, Louisiana, the son of Katherine Marie (Bouligney) and Wilmon Lee Richardson. His father was a prominent attorney whose firm was party to a lawsuit that successfully challenged racial segregation of public transportation in Baton Rouge. Lemon was born under the surname of his mother's then-husband, and discovered that Richardson was his father when he was five.

He is of mostly African-American ancestry, along with Creole; his maternal grandmother was the daughter of a black mother and a white father, who had French and Scots-Irish ancestry. Lemon has stated he was sexually molested as a child by a teenage boy who lived nearby, and that he knew he was gay prior to this incident. He attended Baker High School, a public high school in the town of Baker in East Baton Rouge Parish. He was voted class president during his senior year.

Lemon attended Louisiana State University, where he was a Republican and voted for Ronald Reagan. He later graduated from Brooklyn College with a major in broadcast journalism in 1996 at the age of 30. While at Brooklyn College, he interned at WNYW. He worked for Fox affiliates in St. Louis and Chicago for several years, and was a correspondent for NBC affiliates in Philadelphia and Chicago.

== Career ==
=== Regional reporter ===
Early in his career, Lemon reported as a weekend news anchor for WBRC in Birmingham, Alabama, and for WCAU in Philadelphia, Pennsylvania. For several years he was an anchor and investigative reporter for Fox affiliate KTVI in St. Louis, Missouri, and Fox's Chicago affiliate. Lemon reported for NBC News' New York City operations, including working as a correspondent for both Today, and NBC Nightly News; and as an anchor on Weekend Today and programs on MSNBC. In 2003, he began working at NBC owned-and-operated station WMAQ-TV in Chicago, and was a reporter and local news co-anchor. He won three Emmys for local reporting while at WMAQ.

=== CNN (2006−2023) ===
Lemon joined CNN in September 2006. He has been outspoken in his work at CNN, criticizing the state of cable news and questioning the network publicly. He has also voiced strong opinions on ways that the African American community can improve their lives, which has caused some controversy.

In 2014, CNN began to pilot prime time shows hosted by Lemon, including The Eleventh Hour and The Don Lemon Show. Following the disappearance of Malaysia Airlines Flight 370, Lemon began to host a special, nightly program featuring discussion and analysis of the event by aviation experts. After a realignment of CNN's schedule following the cancellation of Piers Morgan Live, this hour was replaced by the news program CNN Tonight; Lemon would later become the permanent host of the hour as CNN Tonight with Don Lemon. Lemon has also participated in CNN's New Year's Eve Live as a correspondent from a city in the Central Time Zone, most often alongside fellow CNN anchor Brooke Baldwin.

In May 2021, it was announced that Lemon, along with fellow CNN journalist Chris Cuomo, would launch a podcast named The Handoff centering around "politics and personal". On May 17, CNN Tonight with Don Lemon was retitled to simply Don Lemon Tonight; Lemon apologized for how he teased the rebranding on his show, stating that he "didn't mean to set the internet on fire"—in reference to viewers who thought that Lemon would be departing CNN.

In February 2022, CNN announced Lemon would be hosting a talk show for CNN's then-forthcoming streaming service CNN+ called The Don Lemon Show. Two episodes were released in the service's sole month of operation in April 2022.

On September 15, 2022, it was announced that Lemon would co-anchor a new CNN morning show with Kaitlan Collins and Poppy Harlow later in the year. On October 12, 2022, it was announced that the morning show would be named CNN This Morning. Lemon's tenure on the show ended with his April 2023 firing.

==== Political commentary ====
Lemon's outspoken criticism of Donald Trump made him a target of the president. In January 2018, after Trump controversially referred to countries such as El Salvador, Haiti, and Honduras as "shitholes" during a meeting on immigration, Lemon opened CNN Tonight with a proclamation that "The president of the United States is racist. A lot of us already knew that." In March 2016, Lemon was interviewing Omarosa Newman and Kellyanne Conway about the Republican presidential primary. Lemon cut to a commercial break after calling for Newman's microphone to be turned off because she did not want to begin the interview with his original question about a tweet comparing the physical appearances of Trump's wife and US Senator Ted Cruz's wife, which Trump had retweeted.

In October 2018, during a discussion with Chris Cuomo on Cuomo Prime Time amid the Jeffersontown shooting, Lemon argued that Americans should not "demonize any one group or any one ethnicity", and that domestic terrorism by white supremacist Americans, "most of them radicalized to the right", were a bigger threat to the safety of the country than foreigners. He went on to ask, "there is no travel ban on [white people], they have the Muslim ban, there is no white guy ban, so what do we do about that?" Lemon's remarks were criticized by conservative figures, who felt that it was "race baiting" and contradicted his suggestion that Americans should not "demonize any one group or any one ethnicity." In response to the criticism, Lemon cited data from a report by the Government Accountability Office stating that there had been 255 fatalities between September 12, 2001, and December 31, 2016, involving domestic extremists, and that killings by far-right extremists outranked those by Islamic extremists in 10 of the 15 years tracked. In the same period, no deaths were credited to attacks by far-left extremists.

==== Involvement in Jussie Smollett case ====
Lemon faced accusations of unethical journalism during the trial of the Jussie Smollett hate crime hoax case. It was revealed during court testimony that Lemon had sent Smollett messages informing him that the Chicago Police Department did not believe his account of what had happened on the night in question. Lemon, who covered the trial on his CNN show Don Lemon Tonight, did not disclose his involvement or his interactions with Smollett.

==== Allegations of misogyny ====
On February 19, 2023, after Nikki Haley called for "mandatory mental competency tests for politicians over 75 years old", Lemon said "this whole talk about age makes me uncomfortable, I think it is the wrong road to go down", before continuing "She says people, you know, politicians or something are not in their prime. Nikki Haley isn't in her prime, sorry. A woman is considered to be in her prime in her 20s and 30s and maybe 40s." His remarks were criticized online as sexist; Lemon later apologized, and did not appear on CNN This Morning on February 20; he returned on February 22.

In April 2023, Variety published a report alleging that Lemon had a history of misogynistic behavior towards his colleagues, including Soledad O'Brien, Kyra Phillips and Nancy Grace, dating back to 2008. This reportedly included questioning whether O'Brien was black, threatening Phillips, and mocking Grace. A spokesperson for Lemon denied the allegations, saying, "The story, which is riddled with patently false anecdotes and no concrete evidence, is entirely based on unsourced, unsubstantiated, 15-year-old anonymous gossip."

==== Firing from CNN ====
On April 24, 2023, CNN fired Lemon; his contract would have expired in 2026. According to The New York Times, CNN had experienced difficulty in booking guests willing to appear on-air with Lemon, and polls had shown his popularity among viewers had declined. Lemon said that the firing came as a surprise, and that the network had failed to inform him in person, which CNN denied. This coincidentally occurred on the same day that Tucker Carlson was fired by Fox News.

=== The Don Lemon Show (2024) ===
Lemon at the 2026 Status Summit

On January 9, 2024, Lemon announced plans for a new show on X, The Don Lemon Show. X owner Elon Musk was the show's first guest. The interview topics included lawsuits filed by and against Musk, his usage of drugs, his political leanings, and his perspective on immigration and the Great Replacement theory. However, after filming but before airing, Musk canceled the partnership. The interview then appeared on YouTube and as a podcast instead. The show now operates independently, with episodes streaming live and on-demand via its official YouTube channel @TheDonLemonShow. The channel delivers unfiltered discussions on current events like U.S. politics, the Trump administration, international crises such as Iran tensions, economic issues, and media freedom.

=== Cities Church protest and arrest on federal charges (2026) ===
On January 18, 2026, Lemon livestreamed an anti-ICE protest inside Cities Church in Saint Paul, Minnesota, during a worship service. Activists alleged that a pastor associated with the church also held a leadership role within U.S. Immigration and Customs Enforcement (ICE). Lemon interviewed protesters and congregants during a multi-hour livestream.

Following the protest, officials within the U.S. Department of Justice sought to bring federal charges against Lemon and Georgia Fort, an independent journalist from Minnesota who also covered the protest. According to reporting, prosecutors considered charging him under the Freedom of Access to Clinic Entrances Act (FACE Act), codified at 18 U.S.C. §248, which prohibits the use of force, threat of force, or physical obstruction to interfere with a person's exercise of religious worship; and under 18 U.S.C. §241, a Reconstruction-era civil rights conspiracy statute commonly associated with the Ku Klux Klan Act.

A federal magistrate judge declined to approve the proposed criminal complaint, saying the government had not presented sufficient probable cause at that stage. Lemon said he was present as a journalist, and his attorney argued his conduct was protected by the First Amendment. Speaking on Jimmy Kimmel Live!, he said that his attorney had told authorities he would turn himself in, but that offer went unacknowledged.

On January 29, 2026, a federal grand jury returned an indictment and federal law enforcement surprised Lemon in a hotel lobby and took him into custody. Four others linked to the protest, including Georgia Fort, were arrested separately. Lemon was released without being required to post a bond on January 30, 2026 and said that "he will not be silenced". On February 13, 2026, while appearing before Minnesota-based Magistrate Judge Douglas L. Micko, Lemon pled not guilty.

==== Reactions to the arrest ====
Don Lemon's arrest has drawn a strong response from free speech advocacy groups and press freedom groups, with the National Press Club and PEN America saying, "journalism is not a crime".

The ACLU described the move as a serious threat to freedom of the press and the First Amendment. Isha Bhandari, director of the ACLU's Speech, Privacy, and Technology Project, said the prosecution of the journalists, after a federal judge denied their arrest warrants, sends a chilling message of pressure and intimidation.

Former US Vice President Kamala Harris referred to the arrest of Don Lemon and other independent journalists by the Trump administration as an "affront to rights and freedoms". Harris said the arrest of the journalists by the Trump administration represented the suppression of a critical press.

Licensed attorney Eric Rassbach of the Becket law firm expressed skepticism of Lemon's defense in The Wall Street Journal. He said, "neither journalists nor protesters enjoy any constitutional right to invade someone else's private space to report on the news or proclaim their message."

== Honors and awards ==
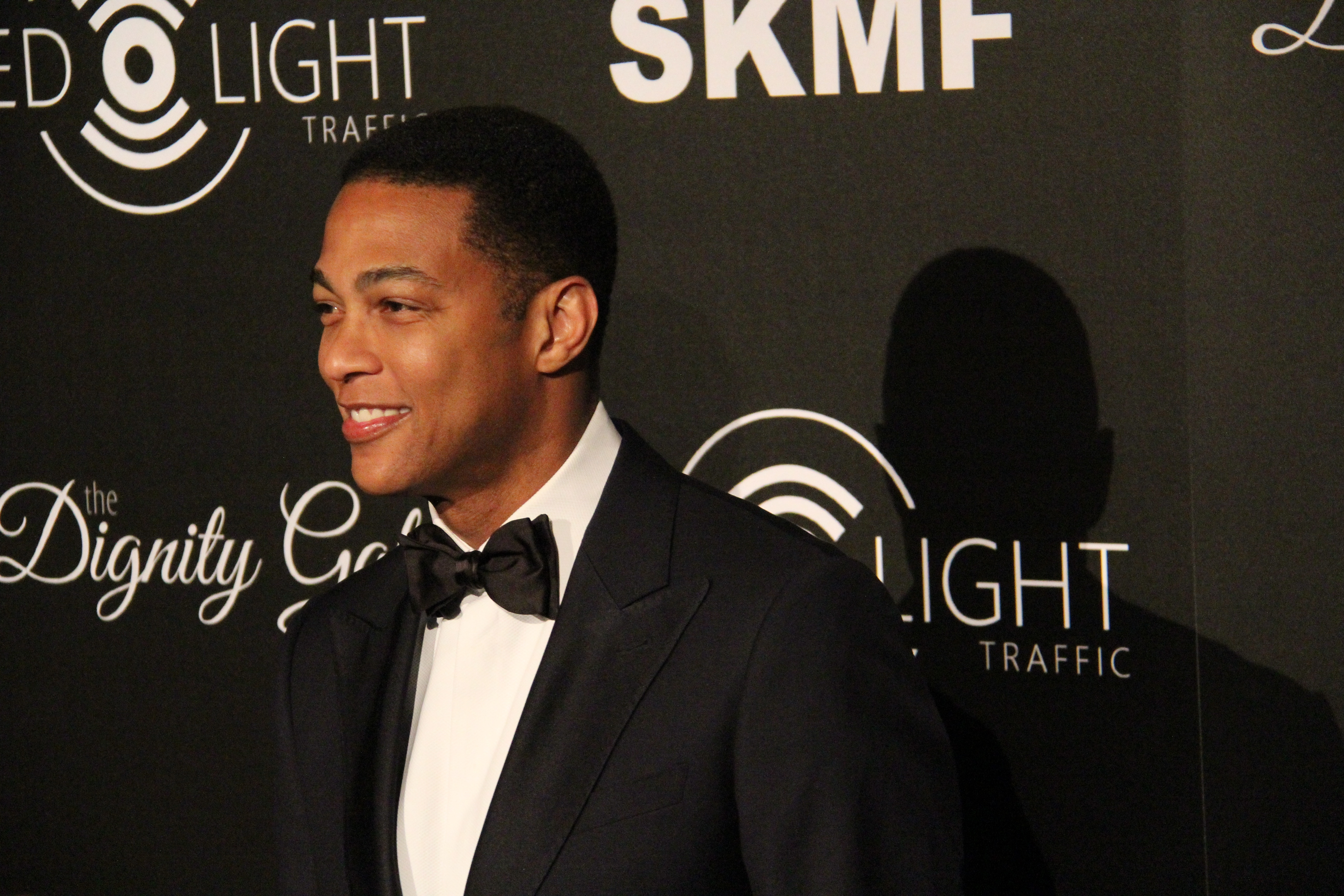
Lemon at Redlight Traffic's inaugural Dignity Gala in October 2013

Organizations	Year	Notes	Result	Ref.
Edward R. Murrow Award	2002	For his coverage of the capture of the D.C. area sniper	Honored	
Chicago / Midwest Emmy Awards	2006	For business feature about Craigslist real estate listings, "Life on Craigslist", (Note: For Outstanding Achievement within a Regularly Scheduled News Program – Specialty Report: Business/Consumer.)	Won	
Chicago / Midwest Emmy Awards	2006	Reporting on the HIV/AIDS pandemic in Africa, "Journey to Africa" (Note: For Outstanding Achievement within a Regularly Scheduled News Program – Soft News Feature Series and Outstanding Achievement for Alternate Media/New Media Interactivity) for WMAQ-TV.	Won	
Ebony Magazine	2009	Voted as one of the 150 most influential African Americans	Honored	
The Advocate	2014	Listed as one of the 50 Most Influential LGBTQ People in Media	Honored	
Native Son Award	2016	To "encourage the increased visibility and impact of black gay men in society"	Honored	
Out Magazine	2017	Named as one of "the most influential LGBTQ people in the USA."	Honored	
Queerty Magazine	2019	Named him one of the "Pride50" "trailblazing LGBT individuals"	Honored	

== Personal life ==
Lemon lives in an apartment in Harlem, New York, and has another home in Sag Harbor on Long Island.

In his 2011 memoir, Transparent, Lemon publicly came out as gay—having been out in his personal life and with close colleagues—becoming "one of the few openly gay black men in broadcasting". He also discussed colorism in the black community and the sexual abuse he suffered as a child. He dedicated the book to Tyler Clementi, a college student who killed himself after his roommate outed him online.

On January 31, 2018, Lemon's sister, L'Tanya "Leisa" Lemon Grimes, died at the age of 58; police concluded that her death was an accidental drowning in a pond while fishing. After being absent for approximately a week, he opened his show on February 6, 2018, by thanking everyone who wished him "prayers and words of encouragement".

Lemon met real estate agent Tim Malone in 2016, after which the two began dating. The couple married on April 6, 2024, in New York City.

== Published works ==
- Lemon, Don (2011). Transparent. Farrah Gray Publishing, Inc. ISBN 978-0-9827027-8-9.
- Lemon, Don (2021). This Is the Fire: What I Say to My Friends About Racism. Little, Brown and Company. ISBN 9780316257572.

== See also ==
- Cable news in the United States
- LGBTQ culture in New York City
- List of LGBTQ people from New York City
- List of United States over-the-air television networks
- New Yorkers in journalism
- NYC Pride March
