= Press gaggle =

Informal press briefing

A press gaggle (as distinct from a press conference or press briefing) is an informal press briefing. The term has been used to refer to a briefing by the White House press secretary on the record, but disallowing videography. The term can refer to the informal interactions between the press and the press secretary that occur before a videotaped press briefing. During the Biden administration the term has been used to refer to informal contact between the press and President Biden.

A former member of the White House press corps provided the following historical context:

"Gaggles" historically refer to informal briefings the press secretary conducts with the press pool rather than the entire press corps. ...they were more or less off the record, and their purpose was mostly to exchange information - the president's schedule and briefing schedule, from the administration side; heads-up on likely topics or early comment on pressing issues, from the news side. Briefings were what everybody knows them to be.

In previous administrations, when the President traveled, sometimes the press secretary would hold a gaggle with the press pool that travels on Air Force One - not every time, but sometimes, and always informally. In this administration, Ari [i.e. Ari Fleischer] does a gaggle on the plane every time the President goes out of town, and a transcript is made available for press corps members who weren't on the plane. These mid-air mini-briefings are the "gaggles" you can find transcripts of on the White House website.

The blog maintained by Newsweek magazine's political reporters is called The Gaggle; on their main page, their definition for "gaggle" when used to refer to the Washington, D.C. press, is "a flock of reporters pecking at a politician."

According to longtime dean of the White House press corps Helen Thomas, the term was coined by Dee Dee Myers, the White House press secretary in 1993–94 during the Clinton administration.

About mid-morning, the press corps heads into its first briefing in the press secretary's office. Dee Dee Myers began calling it the morning "gaggle" and the name seems to have stuck.... We gather around the press secretary's desk, ask our questions and then head back to our offices to write our stories.

"Gaggle" was prominently in the news on February 24, 2017. The Trump White House excluded several major news organizations, including CNN, the New York Times and Politico, from a regular press gaggle. Favorable press outlets were not excluded.
