= Kaitlan Collins =

American journalist (born 1992)

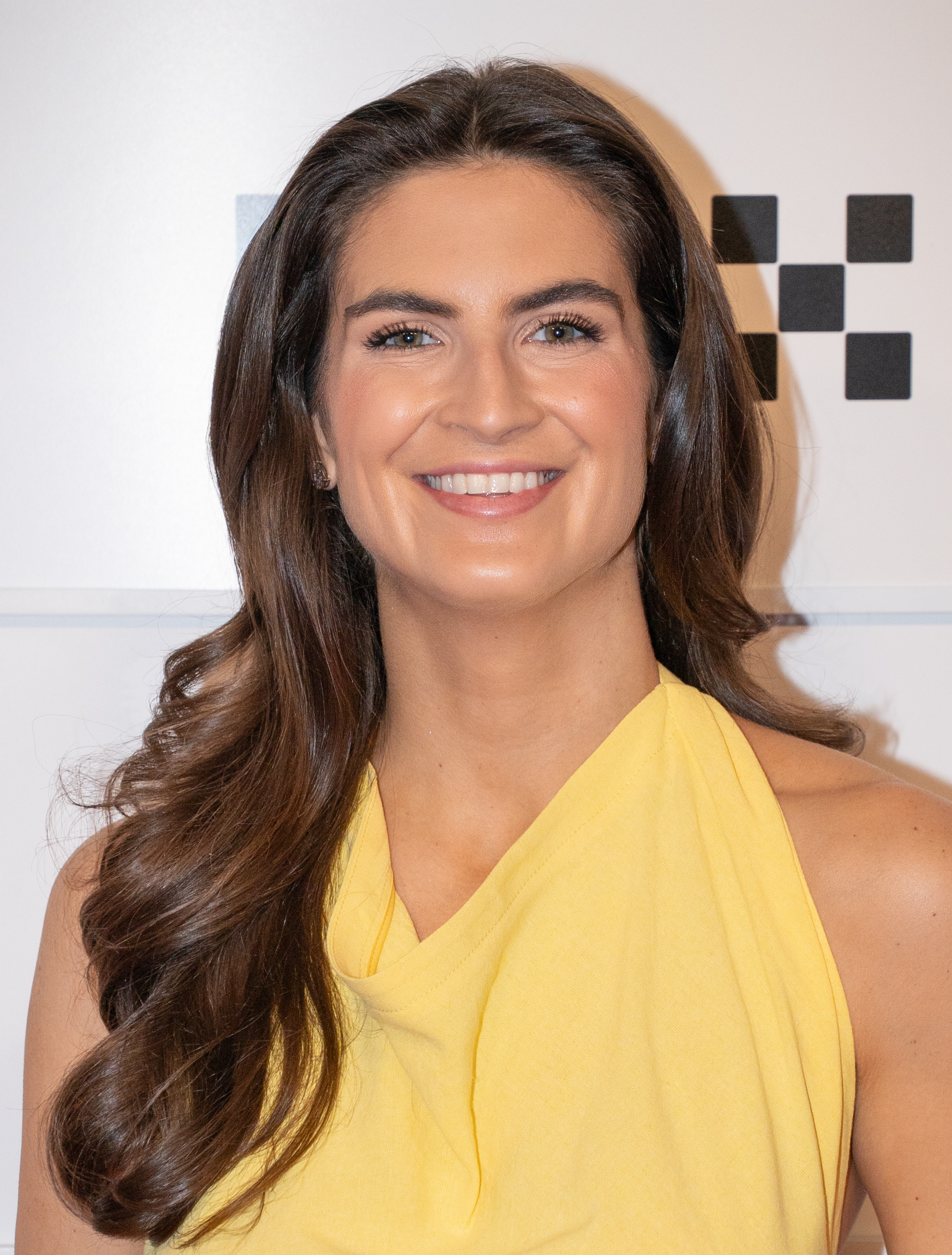
- Collins in 2026
- Born: April 7, 1992 (age 34); Prattville, Alabama, U.S.
- Education: University of Alabama (BA)
- Occupations: Journalist; TV anchor
- Employers: The Daily Caller (2014–2017); CNN (2017–present)
- Known for: The Source with Kaitlan Collins

Kaitlan Collins (born April 7, 1992) is an American journalist and news anchor at CNN. She is the former co-anchor of CNN This Morning. She has hosted The Source at 9 p.m. since July 10, 2023. She also served as the network's chief White House correspondent from January 2021 until November 2022. Previously, she was the White House correspondent for the website The Daily Caller. She resumed her role as CNN's chief White House correspondent for the second Trump presidency.

== Early life and education ==
Collins was born on April 7, 1992, in Prattville, Alabama, a suburb of Montgomery. She has four siblings. Her father, Jeff Collins Sr., is a retired mortgage banker who now sells mobile homes. She earned a black belt in karate while she was growing up. She has said that she does not recall her parents voting or expressing strong opinions about political candidates. Collins graduated from Prattville High School and went on to attend the University of Alabama. She initially chose to major in chemistry, before majoring in journalism. She earned a Bachelor of Arts in political science and journalism in May 2014. Collins was a member of the Alpha Phi sorority.

== Career ==
=== The Daily Caller (2014–2017) ===
After graduating from college, Collins moved to Washington, D.C., for an internship with the website The Daily Caller. In June 2014, she was hired by The Daily Caller as an entertainment reporter. After she covered the 2016 U.S. presidential election, The Daily Caller named her its White House correspondent in January 2017, and she began covering the first Trump administration. While she was still with The Daily Caller, Collins was invited to make several appearances on CNN. At a White House correspondent event in spring 2017, she met network president Jeff Zucker and thanked him for having her on despite the ideological nature of her employer at the time.

=== CNN (2017–present) ===
In July 2017, CNN hired Collins as part of its efforts in covering presidential news. As a member of the press corps, Collins reported on six or more of Trump's international presidential trips. Collins was involved in an incident with the Trump administration on July 25, 2018, when she attended a photo op in the Oval Office as the day's pool reporter. As the event concluded, Collins asked Trump a series of questions about Vladimir Putin and about Trump's former attorney Michael Cohen. Trump ignored her questions.

Collins was subsequently barred from a Trump administration press conference in the White House Rose Garden that afternoon, and was told by senior White House officials that such questions were "inappropriate for that venue". Trump's press secretary Sarah Huckabee Sanders said that Collins had "shouted questions and refused to leave"; Trump's advisor Kellyanne Conway said that the action was about "being polite". Trump's deputy chief of staff for communications, Bill Shine, objected to the characterization of the White House's action as a "ban" but "declined to tell reporters what word he would use to characterize the White House's decision to block her from attending the event". CNN stated that Collins' ban was "retaliatory" and "not indicative of an open and free press". The White House Correspondents Association called the ban "wholly inappropriate, wrong-headed, and weak." Jay Wallace, president of Fox News, issued a statement in support of Collins, saying that his organization "[stood] in strong solidarity with CNN for the right to full access for [its] journalists as part of a free and unfettered press."

Collins was the CNN White House correspondent for a large part of the written and televised live coverage of the 2020 election, and was subsequently promoted to chief White House correspondent for the incoming Biden administration on January 11, 2021. At a briefing that took place a few weeks after the election, Trump's Press Secretary Kayleigh McEnany refused to take a question from Collins and called her an "activist". At 28, she was the youngest chief White House correspondent in CNN's history, and one of the youngest chief correspondents for a major media network.

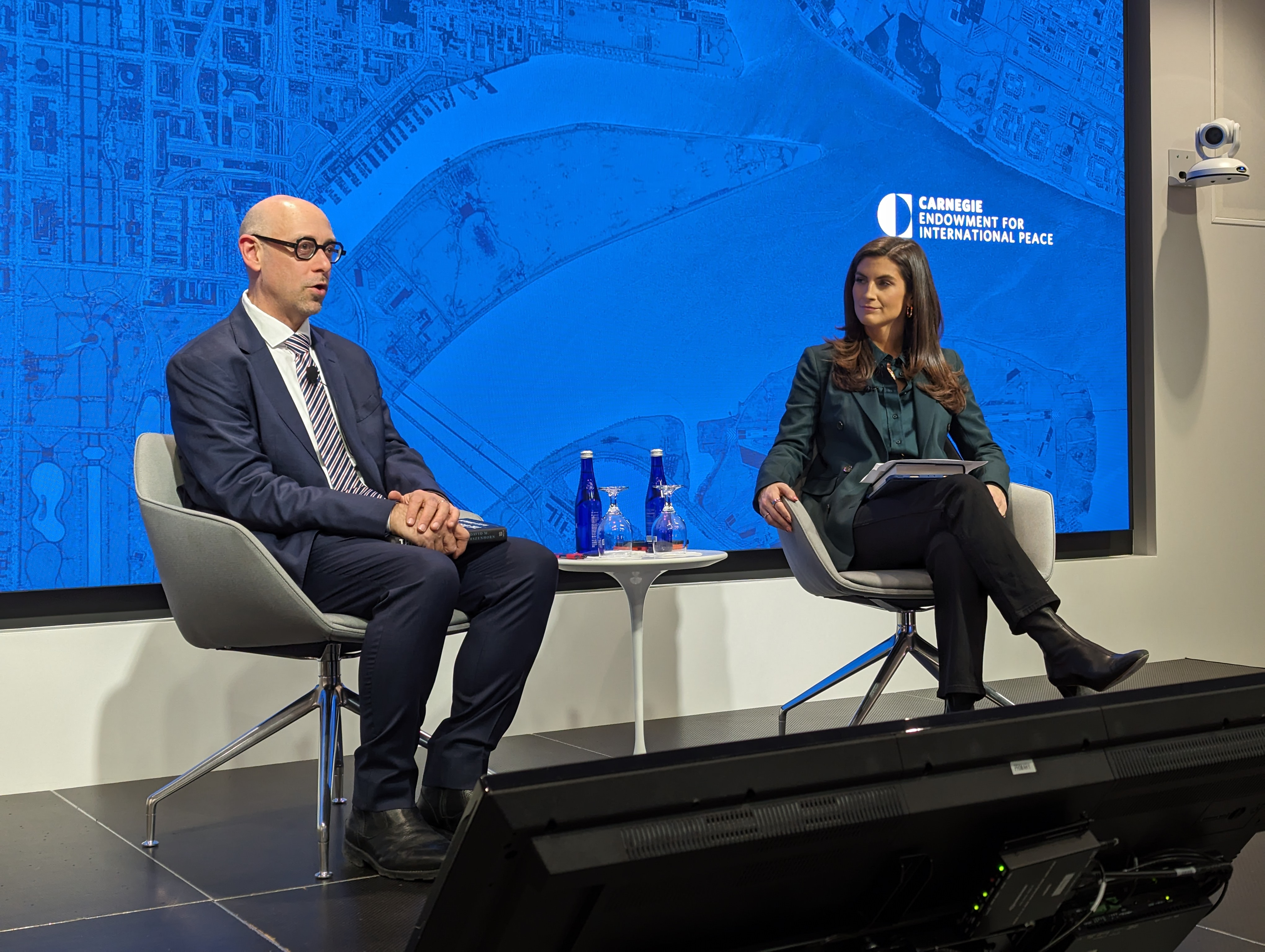
Collins interviewing author David Herszenhorn in 2024

On September 15, 2022, CNN announced that Collins would move to co-anchoring a revamped CNN morning show with Don Lemon and Poppy Harlow, ending her tenure as chief White House correspondent. Before landing the morning show job, Collins was elected to serve as President of the White House Correspondents Association for the 2024-2025 term, a position she relinquished when moving to New York. On October 12, 2022, CNN announced that the morning show would be named CNN This Morning.

Collins moderated a town-hall–style event with Donald Trump on May 10, 2023. The event included questions from Republican primary voters in New Hampshire. During that event, while Collins pointed out that Joe Biden—whose home was also searched when classified documents were discovered at the Penn Biden Center—did not defy a subpoena, Trump asked Collins whether she would let him answer the question. Collins said, "Yes, that's why I asked it", prompting Trump to call her a "nasty person".

On May 17, 2023, Collins was named CNN's new 9 p.m. ET host, which had been vacant since the firing of Chris Cuomo in December 2021, and her program was scheduled to begin in June. She left CNN This Morning on May 25, 2023; her place there was taken by a rotation of CNN anchors. On November 26, 2024, CNN announced that Collins would return as the network's chief White House correspondent for the second Trump administration while keeping her primetime post.

During the second Trump presidency, Collins received attacks and insults from President Donald Trump for her reporting. In December 2025, Trump called her "stupid and nasty" in a Truth Social post. In February 2026, after asking a question about the victims of Jeffrey Epstein, Trump called her "the worst reporter" and said "I don't think I've ever seen you smile". CNN defended Collins in a statement as "an exceptional journalist" who reports "with real depth and tenacity". Collins responded on The Lead with Jake Tapper by calling the topic of Epstein no "laughing matter". During the White House Correspondents Dinner on July 24, Trump compared Collins to transgender actress Dylan Mulvaney and later posted an AI-generated image of Mulvaney's Bud Light ad with Collins' face on Truth Social. Collins posted the Eleanor Roosevelt quote "No one can make you feel inferior without your consent" on Instagram in response.

==== The Source with Kaitlan Collins ====
On July 5, 2023, it was announced that Collins' new 9 p.m. program would be titled The Source with Kaitlan Collins. The show premiered on July 10. She has been hosting the prime time hourly show on weekdays between Anderson Cooper 360° and CNN NewsNight with Abby Phillip.

== Awards ==
Collins was included on Forbes's "30 Under 30: Media" list in 2019. In late 2024, Collins was named one of America's 10 best TV news journalists by GALECA: The Society of LGBTQ Entertainment Critics. The organization, purveyors of the Dorian Awards to mainstream and LGBTQ-themed content, praised Collins for "fact-checking leaders when they spewed misinformation", and for how she "calmly holds the powerful accountable" on her CNN program The Source with Kaitlan Collins.

In 2025, Collins was ranked sixth on Mediaite's Most Influential in News Media list, calling her a "defining voice in the industry." During that year, she concurrently anchored The Source with Kaitlan Collins and served as CNN's Chief White House Correspondent, a dual role that Mediaite noted enhanced both her nightly broadcast and her political reporting. The publication highlighted her reporting depth, on-air interviewing style, and ability to attract a wide range of guests, including figures across the political spectrum. Mediaite also cited her series of high-profile political scoops in 2025 as evidence of her access, credibility, and influence within U.S. news media.

On July 24, 2026, Collins received the Award for Excellence in Presidential News Coverage under Deadline Pressure (broadcast category) at the White House Correspondents' Dinner (WHCD). Presented by Wolf Blitzer, the award was for her coverage of what CNN labeled a "Tense Exchange between Vance, Zelensky", that took place in the Oval Office on February 28, 2025. The award had been scheduled for presentation at the WHCD on April 25, 2026, but the dinner was suddenly canceled after shots rang out.
