= CNN This Morning (2022 TV program) =

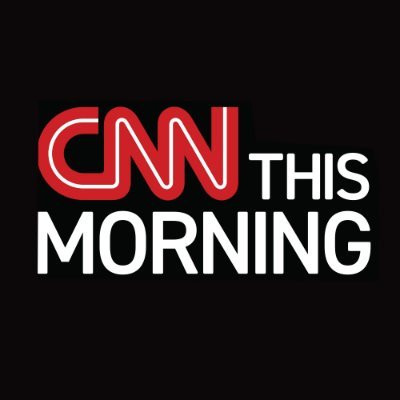
- Genre: News; Talk
- Created by: Chris Licht
- Presented by: Poppy Harlow; Phil Mattingly
- Country of origin: United States
- Original language: English

Production
- Production locations: 30 Hudson Yards; New York City
- Camera setup: Multi-camera
- Running time: 3 hours

Original release
- Network: CNN; HLN (simulcast)
- Release: November 1, 2022 – February 23, 2024

CNN This Morning is an American morning show that formerly aired on CNN. The program first aired on November 1, 2022 succeeding New Day as CNN's morning show. The program was established as part of programming changes led by short-lived CNN president Chris Licht. For contractual reasons, the program also aired in simulcast on HLN, replacing that network's long-time morning show Morning Express with Robin Meade.

It was initially hosted by Don Lemon, Poppy Harlow, and Kaitlan Collins from CNN's New York City studios. Turnover began in April 2023 with the firing of Lemon from the network, and Collins departing in May 2023 to host the new CNN primetime show The Source. Their positions were filled by a rotating co-anchor until August 2023, when former CNN White House correspondent Phil Mattingly was named Harlow's permanent co-anchor.

In February 2024, new CNN CEO Mark Thompson announced that CNN This Morning would be cancelled; its final episode aired on February 23, 2024, and the daytime edition of CNN News Central would be moved up into its former timeslot beginning February 26. The CNN This Morning branding would be concurrently relocated to CNN's early-morning newscast Early Start. CNN's weekend morning show (which was held over from New Day) also continues to carry the CNN This Morning branding,

== History ==
A promotional image featuring the three original hosts.

Chris Licht became the head of CNN in April 2022, succeeding Jeff Zucker following WarnerMedia's merger with Discovery Inc. to form Warner Bros. Discovery. During the company's first upfronts in May 2022, Licht announced plans for a new CNN morning show, stating that "we are seeking to be a disruptor of broadcast morning shows in the space, we believe we have the people and resources to do this."

Licht had prior experience with establishing morning shows at his past employers, with a particular emphasis on formats focusing upon panel discussions. He launched Morning Joe at MSNBC in 2007, and CBS This Morning in 2012; the latter was initially CBS's most successful format in the timeslot in years, but began to see instability and declines in 2017 after the dismissal of Charlie Rose due to sexual harassment allegations, and was rebooted as CBS Mornings in 2021.

On September 15, CNN announced that Don Lemon would leave his primetime show Don Lemon Tonight and move to the new morning show, joined by fellow CNN anchors Poppy Harlow and Kaitlan Collins. On October 12, it was announced that the show would be titled CNN This Morning, and would premiere on November 1 ahead of the U.S. midterm elections. In March 2023, it was announced that Derek Van Dam would be joining as the program's meteorologist.

On December 1, 2022, it was announced that the show would also be simulcast on HLN beginning on December 6, replacing Morning Express with Robin Meade. CNN This Morning was the only news program remaining on HLN, and reports indicate it is being retained solely to fulfil contractual obligations to provide news content, as that channel otherwise shifts to a full-time true crime format.

On April 24, 2023, Lemon was fired from CNN. On May 17, 2023, Collins was announced as the network's 9 p.m. ET anchor, with her new program set to begin in June 2023. Her position with CNN This Morning would be filled on a rotating basis by current CNN staffers. On August 14, 2023, CNN named Phil Mattingly, who had been the network's chief White House correspondent, as Harlow's permanent co-anchor.

On February 5, 2024, new CNN CEO Mark Thompson announced that CNN This Morning had been cancelled, and would air its final broadcast later that month; it aired its final edition on February 23. Thompson stated that CNN would no longer produce any dayside programming out of New York. On February 26, the morning block of CNN News Central with John Berman, Kate Bolduan, and Sara Sidner was moved up from 9 a.m. ET to 7 a.m. ET as a replacement, while CNN's early-morning program Early Start took on the CNN This Morning branding, relocated to Washington, D.C., and expanded back to two hours. Both programs are produced from CNN's headquarters in Atlanta. Mattingly was promoted to CNN's chief domestic correspondent.

== Personnel ==
=== Notable former staff ===
Anchors

- Poppy Harlow (November 1, 2022 – February 23, 2024); left network after show cancellation.
- Phil Mattingly (August 14, 2023 – February 23, 2024); promoted to Chief Domestic Correspondent.
- Don Lemon (November 1, 2022 – April 24, 2023); fired after the April 24 airing of the program. Lemon was replaced with rotating fill-in anchors. It was later decided to have only two co-anchors.
- Kaitlan Collins (November 1, 2022 – May 25, 2023); departed the program after being named permanent host of CNN's 9 p.m. current affairs and talk show hour. It was later titled The Source with Kaitlan Collins.

Meteorologist

- Derek Van Dam (March 27, 2023 – February 23, 2024)

Preceded by Early Start with Kasie Hunt	CNN This Morning; 6:00 AM – 9:00 AM	Succeeded by CNN News Central
