= Poppy Harlow =

American journalist (born 1982)

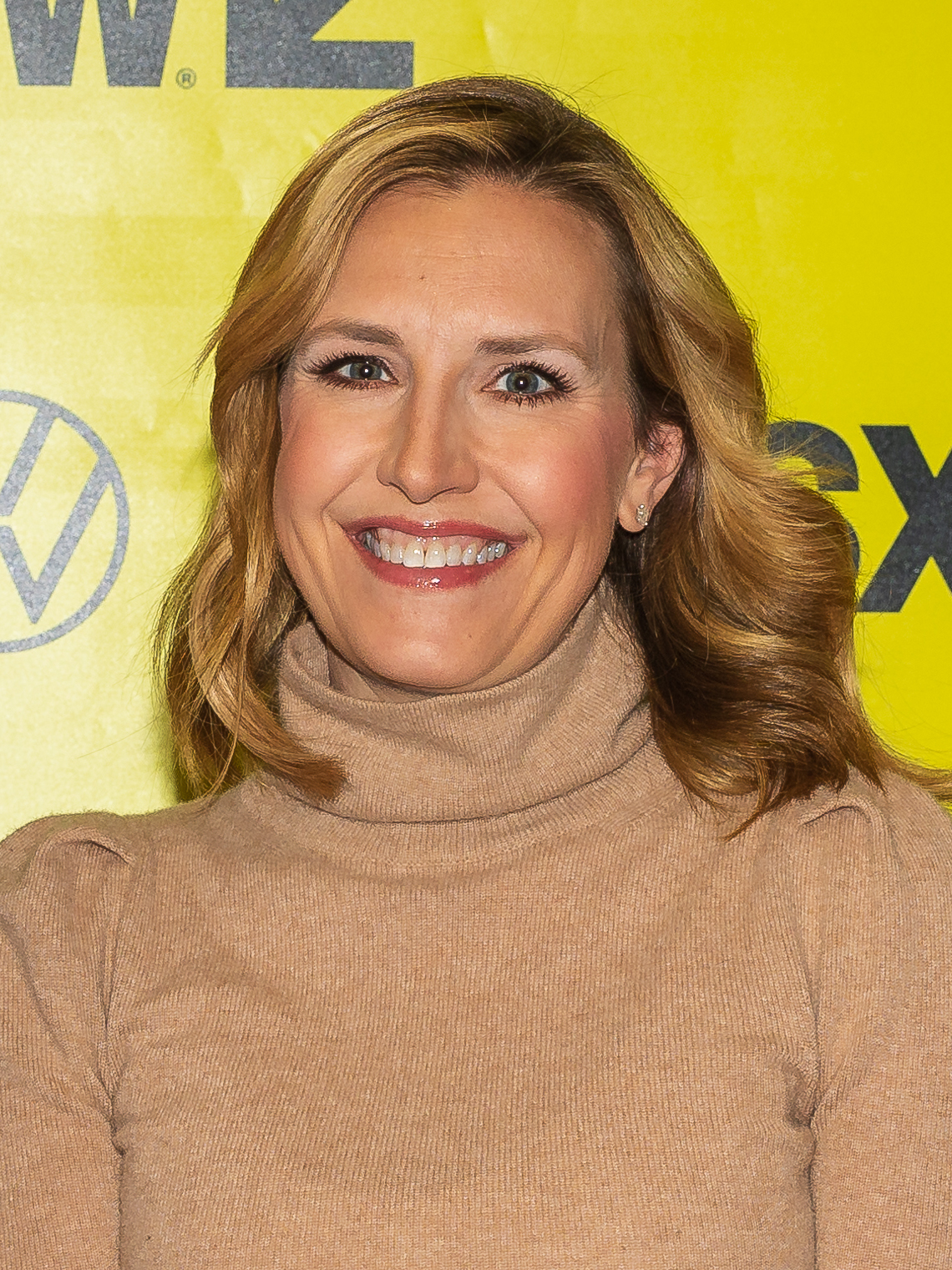
- Harlow in 2022
- Born: Katharine Julia Harlow; May 2, 1982 (age 44); Minneapolis, Minnesota, U.S.
- Education: Columbia University (BA); Yale University (MSL)
- Occupation: Anchor
- Notable credit(s): CNN; CNNMoney; Forbes
- Television: CNN Newsroom
- Spouse: Sinisa Babcic
- Children: 2

Poppy Harlow (born Katharine Julia Harlow; May 2, 1982) is an American journalist and media executive. She is the Founder and CEO of Day 2 Media, Chair of the WSJ Board of Directors Council, permanent member of the Council on Foreign Relations, and Aspen Institute Henry Crown Fellow. She was the co-anchor of CNN This Morning and was based at CNN's New York news bureau. She was previously co-anchor of CNN Newsroom weekdays from 9 A.M. to 11 A.M., a business correspondent at CNN, CNN International and HLN; an anchor for CNNMoney.com; the creator and host of CNN's Boss Files podcast; and a Forbes.com Video Network anchor, reporter and producer.

== Early life and education ==
Harlow was born and raised in Minneapolis, Minnesota. Her father, attorney James Lee Harlow, died when she was 15. Her mother is Mary Louise Baird. Harlow's nickname "Poppy" is a childhood nickname that stuck.

Harlow graduated from The Blake School, a private co-educational college preparatory school in Minneapolis, in 2001. She then graduated magna cum laude and Phi Beta Kappa from Columbia University with a bachelor's degree in Political Science and Middle Eastern studies. She earned a Master of Studies in Law (M.S.L.) degree from Yale Law School in 2022.

== Career ==
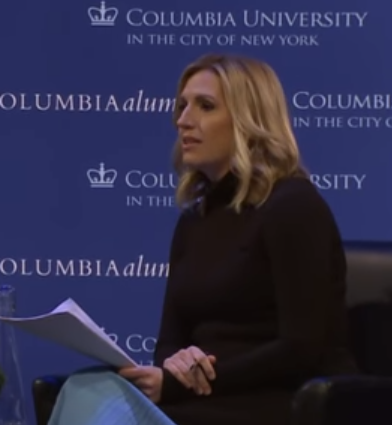
Harlow in 2018

After interning at CBS while in college, Harlow continued working for CBS MarketWatch and as an assistant producer for CBS Newspath after graduation. She then became an anchor and reporter for NY1 News' Local Edition. While at NY1, her news beat covered Staten Island and New Jersey, including reports on local politics, the economy and local cultural events.

In September 2007, Harlow was hired by Forbes.com Video Network, where her area of coverage expanded to fashion, entertainment and business topics.

Harlow joined CNN in 2008 and served as the anchor for CNNMoney.com and reported for CNN, CNN International and HLN. She was named a New York-based CNN correspondent in April 2012. She has won the Gracie Award for best online investigative program or feature and SABEW's Best in Business award.

In 2013, while reporting on the conviction of two Steubenville, Ohio, high school football players for the rape of a 16-year-old, Harlow stated that it was "incredibly difficult, even for an outsider like me, to watch what happened as these two young men that had such promising futures, star football players, very good students, literally watched as they believed their lives fell apart ... [Ma'lik Richmond] collapsed [and told his attorney,] 'My life is over. No one is going to want me now.'" This apparent expression of sympathy for the rapists provoked widespread criticism. A petition requesting that CNN apologize on the air for sympathizing with the Steubenville rapists received over 250,000 signatures within two days of CNN's report.

Harlow also filled in for Richard Quest on CNN International.

Beginning on February 6, 2017, Harlow and Jim Sciutto took over as the new co-anchors of CNN Newsroom from 9 A.M. to 11 A.M. every morning due to Carol Costello's move to HLN. During this time, Harlow created and hosted CNN's Boss Files, a podcast exploring the journeys of business and global leaders. Boss Files released regular episodes through October 12, 2020.

Harlow was selected as a Class of 2019 Henry Crown Fellow at the Aspen Institute.

On September 15, 2022, it was announced that Harlow would co-anchor the new CNN revamped morning show with Don Lemon and Kaitlan Collins later in the year. She would also leave her 9 a.m. to 11 a.m. ET role on CNN Newsroom. On October 12, 2022, it was announced that the morning show would be named CNN This Morning.

In April 2024, Harlow announced she was leaving CNN. She had been moved out of the anchor position for the morning show for Kasie Hunt and had discussions about other roles at the network before deciding to move on. She did not announce new professional plans at the time. On May 14, 2024 Harlow delivered the keynote speech for Columbia College’s Class Day.

Following her departure from CNN, Harlow and her family moved to Paris. In 2025 she founded Day 2 Media and is based between Paris and New York City.

== Awards ==
- 2015 Emmy Nominee - Outstanding Live Coverage of a Current News Story - Long Form for "Ukraine: Shooting in Independence Square"
- 2015 Emmy Nominee - Outstanding Business and Economic Reporting in a Regularly Scheduled Newscast, Anderson Cooper 360° for "GM Blamed for Death"
- 2016 Emmy Nominee - Outstanding Business and Economic Reporting - Long Form, CNN Newsroom for "Hunger Games: Feeding America's Most Vulnerable Children"
- 2019 Emmy Nominee - Outstanding Coverage of a Breaking News Story in a Newscast, CNN Newsroom for "CNN New York Bomb Evacuation"
- 2022 John Jay Award recipient from her alma mater, Columbia College

== Personal life ==
Harlow is married to Sinisa Babcic. The couple have two children; a daughter born in April 2016 and a son born in February 2018.

== Works ==
- Harlow, P.; Kaulitzki, R. (2021). The Biggest Little Boy: A Christmas Story. Penguin Young Readers Group. ISBN 978-0-593-20457-3.
- Harlow, P.; Jarrett, L.; Chavarri, E. (2024). The Color of Love. Penguin Young Readers Group. ISBN 978-0-593-52710-8.
