= 2023 notable events in American television =

The following is a list of notable events in American television in 2023.

== January ==
Date	Event	Source
2	During the first quarter of that night's Monday Night Football game against the Cincinnati Bengals at Paycor Stadium, Buffalo Bills safety Damar Hamlin went into cardiac arrest and collapsed midfield after tackling Bengals wide receiver Tee Higgins. Hamlin received treatment (including CPR and automated external defibrillation) on-field by stadium medical personnel, who were able to restore his heartbeat, and was subsequently taken to University of Cincinnati Medical Center in critical condition. (Hamlin came out of his induced coma on January 5, with his neurological functions determined to be intact; he was released from UCMC on January 9 and returned to Buffalo, where he underwent two additional days of evaluation at Buffalo General Medical Center before being released there.) After being suspended for roughly 45 minutes with 5:58 remaining in the quarter, the game (which was simulcast on ABC, in addition to its regular broadcasts on ESPN, ESPN2, ESPN Deportes and ESPN+) was postponed. On January 6, the NFL announced that the game would not be completed; playoff seeding that was to be determined by the Bills–Bengals game was instead decided by winning percentage (factoring this, the Bengals would clinch the AFC North championship title), and matchups were determined through Wild Card games (involving the Miami Dolphins against the Bills, and the Baltimore Ravens against the Bengals) scheduled for January 14 and 15, respectively. The Bills and Bengals would each advance to the Divisional Playoffs, which saw the Bengals qualify for the AFC Championship, 27–10, in a January 22 rematch against the Bills.	
3	For The View's first episode of the year, current and former hosts (including original panelists Star Jones, Debbie Matenopoulos and Meredith Vieira, the latter appearing via phone call due to illness) reunite to honor Barbara Walters. Walters, who died on December 30, 2022, at age 93, created and produced the ABC daytime talk show, and was among its panelists from its August 1997 debut until her retirement in May 2014.	
5	CBS West Coast flagship KCBS-TV and independent KCAL-TV, both in Los Angeles and owned by the network, jointly rebrand their news department as KCAL News. The change takes effect with the launch of a six-hour local morning newscast on KCAL-TV, with a one-hour simulcast on KCBS-TV (which begins carrying CBS Mornings live at 4 a.m. PT along with the West Coast feed at 7 a.m. PT). Local and network management agreed to the KCAL News rebrand as a way to leverage KCAL-TV's stronger identity in the market, having been the first station to launch a three-hour primetime newscast in 1990.	
6	Dish Network removes 32 stations collectively owned by Mission Broadcasting (including WPIX/New York City, WXXA/Albany, WYOU/Scranton–Wilkes Barre, KWBQ–KASY/Albuquerque–Santa Fe, WNAC/Providence, KAMC/Lubbock, and KLRT–KASN/Little Rock) and White Knight Broadcasting (owner of WVLA/Baton Rouge and KFXK/Longview), after the satellite provider and the two Nexstar Media Group affiliate companies fail to renew a carriage agreement that expired that day. The blackout effectively leaves the affected Mission and White Knight stations without satellite distribution as both groups have been involved in separate carriage disputes with DirecTV (and co-owned DirecTV Stream and U-verse TV) that began in October 2022.	
10	The 80th Golden Globe Awards air on NBC and stream on Peacock from The Beverly Hilton in Beverly Hills, with Jerrod Carmichael hosting. It follows a one-year absence from the network after NBC declined to air the previous year's ceremony in support of boycotts by various media companies, actors, and other creative individuals in the entertainment industry over the Hollywood Foreign Press Association's lack of action to increase the diversity of the organization's board membership. Among television awards, Abbott Elementary was the top winner with three awards each ("Best Television Series – Musical or Comedy", "Best Actress in a Television Series – Musical or Comedy" for Quinta Brunson, and "Best Supporting Actor in a Television Series – Musical-Comedy or Drama" for Tyler James Williams), tying with top film winner The Banshees of Inisherin (which won for "Best Motion Picture – Musical or Comedy", "Best Screenplay", and "Best Actor – Motion Picture Musical or Comedy" for Colin Farrell) for the most wins overall among the ceremony's awards. The 80th Golden Globe Awards is the final ceremony to air on NBC before HFPA was rebranded to Golden Globe Foundation on June 12, 2023.	
12	Nexstar Media Group discontinues live streams of local programming (including newscasts) produced by its stations on their websites and mobile apps, instituting a two-hour delayed feed of each station's local programs in its place. The change is an apparent effort to obtain leverage in contractual negotiations with linear pay TV providers, amid Nexstar's carriage disputes with providers such as DirecTV, Dish Network and Verizon FiOS (see January 6 entry as an example). Three of the group's major-market stations (WGN/Chicago, KTLA/Los Angeles and KRON/San Francisco), and live breaking news and severe weather events covered by the affected stations are exempt from the change, which deviates from the now-standard practice of offering live newscasts online for the convenience of viewers who are unable to view them at home or who live outside of the station's home market.	
15	The 28th Critics' Choice Awards airs on The CW from the Fairmont Century Plaza Hotel in Century City, with Chelsea Handler as host. Among television nominees, Better Call Saul had the most wins with three awards ("Best Drama Series", "Best Actor in a Drama Series" for Bob Odenkirk, and "Best Supporting Actor in a Drama Series" for Giancarlo Esposito), while Abbott Elementary won two awards ("Best Comedy Series", and "Best Supporting Actress in a Comedy Series" for Sheryl Lee Ralph). Everything Everywhere All at Once won five awards (including "Best Picture", and "Best Supporting Actor" for Ke Huy Quan) to become the ceremony's top winner overall and among film nominees. Special honors went to Jeff Bridges (Lifetime Achievement Award) and Janelle Monáe (#SeeHer Award).	
17	The Daily Show begins its post-Trevor Noah era, returning from a five-week hiatus with Leslie Jones beginning a week-long stint as guest host. Jones is the first in a series of guests who anchors the Comedy Central nightly program while the network determines a permanent successor for Noah, who departed from the show after a seven-year run as host in December 2022.	
19	LIV Golf signs a multi-year deal with The CW to broadcast and stream its events beginning with the 14-tournament 2023 season (the first event being the LIV Golf Mayakoba tournament at the El Camaleón Mayakoba Golf Course in Solidaridad, Quintana Roo from February 24 to 26). The deal is the golf organization's first U.S. broadcast deal (its inaugural year in 2022 was available only through YouTube) and the CW's entry into live sports telecasts. This deal was criticized by the National Press Club as an attempt by Saudi Arabia's monarchy (which finances LIV through a sovereign wealth fund) to sportwash its unflattering reputation after their alleged involvement in the October 2018 assassination of journalist Jamal Khashoggi. As CW stations are only contractually obligated to air the network's prime time schedule, 14 affiliates (eight owned by CBS, five owned by Tegna, and Weigel-owned WCIU/Chicago) declined to air the LIV telecasts; CW majority owner Nexstar leased airtime on other stations in those markets.	
23	CBS News Detroit, a localized extension of CBS News's streaming service, formally launches in Detroit. CBS-owned WWJ-TV simulcasts the 6 and 11 p.m. newscasts, with additional newscasts debuting on both platforms in the coming weeks. This marks a return to local news on WWJ-TV since a partially-outsourced morning drive newscast was cancelled in 2012. (An 11 p.m. newscast, produced by co-owned WKBD-TV, ran from 2001 to 2002, when the entire news service was shuttered.) The launch of CBS News Detroit was delayed throughout much of 2022 due to pandemic and supply chain-related delays. WKBD-TV's 10 p.m. news, originally produced remotely from KTVT/KTXA in Dallas–Fort Worth, had already been relaunched as Detroit Now News, a hybrid national-local newscast featuring CBS News Detroit reports and content.	
23	The Association of Pickleball Professionals, now the Association of Pickleball Players, signs multiplatform deals with CBS Sports and ESPN to broadcast and stream its tournaments beginning with the league's 2023 season. In addition to coverage on APP's standalone outlet, APP TV, the agreements encompass eleven of the 22 APP Tour events scheduled for the 2023 season, covering streaming coverage of eight events on ESPN+ (beginning with the Daytona Beach, Florida event held from February 8–12) and accompanying hour-long recap shows airing on ESPN2, and linear broadcasts of three additional events and recap programs on CBS Sports Network.	
24	In the wake of felony charges of domestic abuse against him being made public following a court hearing on January 12, Adult Swim announces that it has fired Rick and Morty co-creator Justin Roiland. The single-count charges of domestic battery and false imprisonment, to which Roiland pled not guilty in October 2020, were related to a complaint involving an alleged incident that occurred ten months prior with an unidentified woman. Following Roiland's exit, production of the animated series continues with co-creator Dan Harmon remaining as its lone showrunner, while the title characters, which had been voiced by Roiland, being recast. Hulu would follow suit the next day, firing him from Solar Opposites (the lead character of which he also voiced, in addition to handling showrunning duties) and the recently premiered Koala Man.	
24	The FCC issues a fine of $504,000 against Fox for "willfully violating" regulations prohibiting the sounding of Emergency Alert System tones or the simulation of an EAS alert during television programming in the absence of an emergency for a November 2021 promotional segment that aired during Fox NFL Sunday for a game telecast involving the New York Giants and Philadelphia Eagles that followed the pre-game show. (The Giants won that game, 13–7.) The promo mimicking an emergency broadcast, described by Fox as a "short comedic advertisement", began with a three-second excerpt of the 853 Hz and 960 Hz tones used to precede EAS alert transmissions, which the network admitted had been downloaded or recorded from a YouTube video.	
25	DirecTV removes Newsmax TV from the namesake satellite provider, and sister services DirecTV Stream and U-verse TV, after the company and network parent Newsmax Media fail to agree on a new contract. Although DirecTV cites aggressive carriage fee demands for the removal (while noting the wide availability of the network's content on its website and free streaming platforms), Newsmax accused the company of "deplatforming" it and fellow archconservative news and commentary channel One America News Network (which DirecTV removed in April 2022), inferring an ideological motive for the decision, even though DirecTV continues to carry their main conservative rival Fox News, and dishonesty about the network's fee increase offers. A group of 41 Republican congressmen led by representative Wesley Hunt (R-TX) sent a letter to the CEOs of DirecTV and shareholders AT&T and TPG Capital the week before, warning them of possible House committee hearings over the impasse should the provider drop the network. Newsmax TV, as with OAN, has challenged the 2020 presidential election, earning support from former president Donald Trump (who is a personal friend of Newsmax CEO Christopher Ruddy) amid his criticism of Fox News for being the first television news outlet to call Arizona for Democratic challenger Joe Biden in that election. DirecTV reached an agreement to resume carriage of Newsmax on March 22.	
25	As part of a multi-year agreement that also extends their carriage contract for Court TV, the E. W. Scripps Company and YouTube TV announce that the vMVPD service will add Ion and digital multicast networks Bounce TV and Scripps News to its lineup, effective on this date. Under the terms of the deal, YouTube TV has the option of adding fellow Scripps-owned multicast networks Grit, Ion Mystery and Laff at a later date.	
27	ABC News officially fire Amy Robach and T. J. Holmes. The two hosts of GMA3: What You Need to Know, who had respectively been with the network since 2012 and 2014, had been off the air since December 5, 2022, after a Daily Mail exposé revealed they had been in a romantic relationship (and had left their respective spouses), an affair ABC described then as "an internal and external disruption" but not a violation of company policy (although an internal investigation would commence). On May 11, the news division named Good Morning America weekend co-anchor Eva Pilgrim and correspondent Demarco Morgan to co-host GMA3, while transportation correspondent Gio Benitez (who was among those acting as substitute hosts on the program following Holmes and Robach's departure) replaced Pilgrim's GMA weekend anchor slot.	
27	Deadline reports that CNBC would discontinue producing original entertainment content for its prime time block, emphasizing instead on reruns of reality and documentary shows (e.g. Shark Tank, American Greed). The business news-oriented network's prime time had been home to first-run unscripted content that focused on wealth and lifestyle, including Jay Leno's Garage (whose cancellation had been announced earlier in the week) and the Kevin O'Leary-hosted Money Court.	
30	Paramount Global announces plans to fully integrate its Showtime network with the premium tier of the Paramount+ streaming service, beginning on 2024. The combined service would be branded as Paramount+ with Showtime, replacing a bundle of the same name that launched in mid-2022.	
30	FuboTV removes CBS stations in 160 markets after their respective owners (including Nexstar Media Group, Sinclair Broadcast Group, the E. W. Scripps Company, Hearst Television, Cox Media Group and Tegna) declined to accept the terms of a renewed master affiliate carriage agreement negotiated between network parent Paramount Global and the vMVPD. A national CBS feed, offering most of the network's base schedule (excluding some live sports events) and news content from the CBS News Streaming Network, was provided to substitute the affected affiliates. (CBS's owned-and-operated stations were not affected by the impasse as they were carried on a different carriage agreement.) Three weeks after the affiliate board approved a revised carriage deal, the affected stations began returning to Fubo on March 31.	
30	Longtime KSAT-TV/San Antonio sports director Greg Simmons resigns after 42 years, a decision made after his being charged for DWI. Weekend sports anchor Larry Ramirez would serve as KSAT's interim sports director.	
31	YouTube TV removes MLB Network from its channel lineup after failing to reach a contract renewal agreement. Subscribers were able to continue watching select national Major League Baseball games on Fox, ESPN and TBS.	

== February ==
Date	Event	Source
3	For the first time since 2015, Paul Shaffer reunites The World's Most Dangerous Band (the house band for David Letterman's Late Night and Late Show) to fill in for The Tonight Show's regular house band The Roots, who were in Los Angeles preparing for a performance at the Grammys.	
5	The 65th Annual Grammy Awards airs on CBS from the Crypto.com Arena in Los Angeles. Trevor Noah serves as host of a ceremony that sees notable winners including Lizzo, whose "About Damn Time" wins Record of the Year; Harry Styles, whose Harry's House wins Album of the Year; and Beyoncé, whose four wins on the night (including Renaissance as Best Dance/Electronic Album) push her career Grammy mark to 32, making her the most-lauded artist in Grammy history.	
7	NFL Network removes analyst and former player Michael Irvin from its coverage of Super Bowl LVII following allegations of sexual misconduct toward a woman at a hotel he was staying at in the Phoenix area, where the game was held. Though surveillance video showed him interacting with the woman, Irvin told Dallas–Fort Worth radio station KRLD-FM and The Dallas Morning News that he had no recollection of any incident because he had been inebriated, and denied any wrongdoing. Irvin would file a $100 million defamation suit against the anonymous accuser and the hotel on February 9.	
8	The Wall Street Journal reports Warner Bros. Discovery would continue to operate Discovery+ as a standalone streaming service, a pivot from the company's initial plans to shutter it entirely following the May 13 launch of its combination service Max, which features most of Discovery+'s existing content library in addition to the full HBO Max library. WBD cites concerns about Discovery+ subscribers opting out of moving to the pricier offering for the decision. (WBD has indicated that the combined service's ad-supported and ad-free tiers will be set at a higher price point than those of HBO Max and Discovery+.)	
8	NewsNation correspondent Evan Lambert is arrested on disorderly conduct and criminal trespassing complaints for allegedly disrupting a news conference by Ohio Governor Mike DeWine on the February 3, derailment of a Norfolk Southern freight train containing hazardous chemicals that prompted residential evacuations in East Palestine. The D.C.-based correspondent was conducting a live report for the Nexstar-owned cable news channel's Rush Hour program when police officers inside the gym of the village's elementary school, where the news conference was held, told him to conclude the report while DeWine was speaking, and subsequently pushed Lambert to the ground and handcuffed him after acceding to their request. DeWine later condemned the officers' actions, clarifying he did not authorize Lambert's arrest. Lambert was released from the Columbiana County Jail later that evening on an $850 bond; he is scheduled to be arraigned on February 23.	
12	The Kansas City Chiefs defeat the Philadelphia Eagles, 38–35, in Super Bowl LVII at State Farm Stadium in Glendale, Arizona, which was broadcast on Fox (in English) and Fox Deportes (in Spanish), and streamed on the Fox Sports app and NFL+. It was the first Super Bowl assignment for play-by-play announcer Kevin Burkhardt and color analyst Greg Olsen, who succeeded Joe Buck and Troy Aikman as Fox's NFL broadcast team in 2020 after they were hired by ABC/ESPN to call its Monday Night Football and NFL playoff telecasts. The Fox telecast averaged 115.1 million viewers according to Nielsen data, becoming the most-watched program in American television history (just ahead of Super Bowl XLIX), with viewership reaching 118.7 million during the halftime show (headlined by Rihanna, who revealed her second pregnancy with the performance); the Fox Deportes telecast was watched by 951,000 viewers, becoming both the most-watched Super Bowl broadcast and the most watched non-soccer sports telecast in Spanish-language cable history.	(Note: Viewership for Super Bowl LVII was initially estimated at 113 million across Fox, Fox Deportes and streaming platforms; errors in Nielsen's audio encoding and out-of-home viewing methodologies were later determined to have undercounted viewership by two million viewers (one million misattributed to NFL Network's Super Bowl coverage and one million undercounted in out-of-home viewership tallies).)
15	Gray Television sells Fox affiliate KNIN in Boise, Idaho (operated by the E. W. Scripps Company) to Marquee Broadcasting in exchange for MeTV affiliate WPGA in Macon, Georgia. When completed, the deal will result in Gray owning at least one full-power station in nine of Georgia's eleven television markets. The deal was completed on May 1.	
16	Ryan Seacrest announces he would resign as co-host and executive producer of Live with Kelly and Ryan, which he has hosted alongside Kelly Ripa since 2017, to concentrate full-time on other projects (including his hosting duties on American Idol and his syndicated radio program). Ripa's husband, Mark Consuelos, who has frequently served as guest host since she became co-host of the Disney/ABC-produced syndicated morning talk show in 2001, succeeds Seacrest on April 17 as permanent co-host of the renamed Live with Kelly and Mark. Seacrest (who returns occasionally to guest co-host) continues hosting Live through April 14, at which time he relocated to Los Angeles to host Idol's live performance shows.	
22	Spectrum News 13 reporter Dylan Lyons is killed, and colleague and photojournalist Jesse Walden critically injured, in a shooting incident in the Orlando suburb of Pine Hills, Florida that also killed a nine-year-old girl and critically injured her mother. Lyons and Walden were at the scene of a homicide that killed of a woman earlier that day. A teenager was taken into custody as a suspect in both incidents.	
23	Ellen Pompeo makes her last appearance as a cast regular on Grey's Anatomy as her character, Meredith Grey, leaves Seattle and Grey Sloan Memorial Hospital for Boston in the episode "I'll Follow the Sun." Pompeo has been with the ABC medical drama since its 2005 premiere, and remains attached as an executive producer and narrator, in addition to making occasional on-screen guest appearances, the next of which was the current 19th season finale in May.	
23	Dish Network is hit by a cyberattack that resulted in data being extracted from its IT networks; and the company's internal servers, customer support systems and company websites being knocked offline, with service disruptions affecting its co-owned vMVPD service Sling TV and wireless provider Boost Mobile. Dish and Sling subscribers also experienced difficulties accessing streaming apps (such as its Dish Anywhere service, OTT services purchased through Dish and TV Everywhere apps of various networks carried by the Dish satellite service and Sling) using their provider logins. Some employees continued to be paid during the outage despite it preventing them from performing their jobs. Although Dish restored "many of the systems," including its websites, customer service operations and self-service applications within weeks of the attack, service disruptions and technical issues lingered into March as customers continued to report call center backlogs (some lasting up to 14 hours) and problems processing payments. Several Dish investors filed a class action lawsuit over the breach on March 30, accusing the company of negligence in failing to properly secure customer data.	
24	Warner Bros. Discovery informs the teams whose games air on its AT&T SportsNet channels based in Denver, Houston, and Pittsburgh that the company would exit the regional sports network business, and that its AT&T Sports Networks unit will file for Chapter 7 liquidation bankruptcy unless the channels are sold or the teams take back their broadcast rights by March 31. Teams that air on Seattle-based Root Sports Northwest are not part of the proceedings as WBD only holds a minority stake in that network.	
24	Warner Bros. Discovery files a breach of contract lawsuit with the New York Supreme Court, accusing Paramount Global of violating a 2019 agreement that gave HBO Max rights to stream the first 23 seasons of South Park as well as three subsequent seasons that had yet to air at the time on Paramount-owned Comedy Central. The suit alleges Paramount diverted most of the animated series' post-2019 episodes to Paramount+ under a separate $900-million deal between ViacomCBS Domestic Media Networks (now Paramount Media Networks) and series creators Trey Parker and Matt Stone reached in August 2021, despite WBD holding streaming exclusivity over the series under their $596.7-million (or $1.7 million per episode) deal, and only produced 14 of the 30 additional episodes promised to fill out the WBD–Paramount contract. Paramount countersued WBD on April 19, alleging the contract did not define a specified episode commitment for future seasons or required it to license made-for-streaming South Park movies to HBO Max. WBD and Paramount both claim they are owed $52 million in unpaid license fees.	
25	The 54th NAACP Image Awards airs from the Pasadena Civic Auditorium.	
26	The 29th Screen Actors Guild Awards are presented at the Fairmont Century Plaza in Century City, California, with notable winners including the motion picture Everything Everywhere All At Once (four awards) and TV series Abbott Elementary and The White Lotus (wins for comedy and drama ensembles, respectively). The ceremony airs live on Netflix's YouTube channel, a one-year arrangement between SAG and Netflix before the streamer, once its live-streaming capabilities are worked out, carries the ceremony exclusively beginning in 2024. (The SAG Awards' former broadcast homes, TNT and TBS, announced in 2022 that they would no longer broadcast the ceremony.)	

== March ==
Date	Event	Source
4	The 2023 Kids' Choice Awards airs on Nickelodeon and was simulcast on six Paramount-owned sister networks (including the Nick Jr. Channel, Nicktoons, TeenNick, TV Land and MTV2) from the Microsoft Theater in Los Angeles, with Nate Burleson and Charli D'Amelio (who won "Favorite Female Creator") as hosts. Harry Styles won the most awards among all nominees with three each: for "Favorite Male Artist", "Favorite Global Music Star", and "Favorite Song" (for "As It Was"). High School Musical: The Musical: The Series (with Olivia Rodrigo and Joshua Bassett winning both "Favorite Kids TV Star" categories) and Wednesday (which won "Favorite Family TV Show" and "Favorite Female Family TV Star" for Jenna Ortega) were the top winners among TV nominees with two each. Other major winners include Sonic the Hedgehog 2 ("Favorite Movie"), SpongeBob SquarePants ("Favorite Animated Series"), and Adam Sandler ("King of Comedy Award"). Also on this day, Nickelodeon receives its first major rebrand in almost six years.	
8	Fremantle, the production company behind The Price Is Right, announces that the CBS game show will relocate from Los Angeles' Television City to Haven Studios, a Fremantle-co-owned facility in nearby Glendale, California, when its 52nd season begins taping in the summer. The game show has originated from Studio 33 at Television City (renamed in 1998 as the Bob Barker Studio, in honor of the former longtime host) since premiering in 1972; its move, and the pending relocations of several other shows from the facility (among them The Young and The Restless and Real Time with Bill Maher), comes before the start of a $1.25 billion renovation of the property, which Hackman Capital Partners bought from CBS in 2018.	
8	Hulu removes 34 ABC stations operated by Sinclair Broadcast Group from its vMVPD service in 32 markets, after the streaming service reportedly declined Sinclair's offer to add Tennis Channel as part of a renewed agreement for the stations. Unlike the earlier FuboTV master agreement dispute between CBS and several of its affiliate operators (see January 30 entry), Hulu, which is majority owned by ABC parent Disney, did not substitute the affected Sinclair stations with a linear ABC national feed. (A feed was provided to the affected markets exclusively for the network's telecast of the 95th Academy Awards four days later.) The dispute lasted until April 21, when Hulu and Sinclair agreed to reinstate the affected stations through a new contract.	
8	WLBT/Jackson removes longtime morning anchor and chief meteorologist Barbie Bassett (who is white), after she quoted the Snoop Dogg-coined slang, "Fo shizzle, my nizzle" ("nizzle" referring to the Black term of endearment vernacular for "nigger"), when a collaboration with another WLBT reporter was jokingly raised during the Gray-owned NBC affiliate's 11:00 a.m. newscast, after a report on the introduction of a new wine to the rapper's Cali Wine Collection line. Although WLBT, which had its license revoked by the FCC in 1969 from original owner Lamar Life Insurance, due to the station's advocacy of racial segregation and omission of civil rights movement coverage during NBC News broadcasts, has not formally disclosed Bassett's status, her biography was removed from its website. Bassett previously apologized for a similar incident in October 2022, in which she suggested reporter Carmen Poe (who is Black) ask her grandmother, whom Bassett referred to as "grandmammy", for a pie recipe to get a scoop on a then-upcoming ESPN College Gameday telecast from Jackson State University.	
12	The 95th Academy Awards airs on ABC from the Dolby Theatre in Hollywood, with Jimmy Kimmel as host. Everything Everywhere All at Once was the top winner with seven awards, including Best Picture, Best Actress (Michelle Yeoh, who became the first Asian woman to win the honor), Best Supporting Actor (Ke Huy Quan), and Best Supporting Actress (Jamie Lee Curtis). Other major winners included All Quiet on the Western Front with four awards (including Best International Feature Film) and The Whale with two (including Brendan Fraser for Best Actor). The telecast was seen by an estimated 18.7 million viewers, up 12% from the previous year.	
13	As part of a multi-year agreement that also extends their existing carriage contracts for the group's 40 CBS stations and NewsNation, Nexstar Media Group and YouTube TV announce that the vMVPD service will add 59 Nexstar-operated stations serving 56 markets (consisting of 29 CW, 26 MyNetworkTV and four independent stations, including WPIX/New York City, KTLA/Los Angeles, WGN-TV/Chicago, KRON/San Francisco, WPHL/Philadelphia, and WDVM–WDCW/Washington, D.C.) to its lineup. The deal fills a major affiliate coverage gap for The CW on YouTube TV, as Nexstar was the largest group without a carriage deal for its CW stations (CBS and Sinclair Broadcast Group were the largest CW station operators to offer their affiliates on the service); it also expands local MyNetworkTV carriage on YTTV (beyond affiliates operated by Fox and Sinclair) for the first time.	
14	Diamond Sports Group files for Chapter 11 bankruptcy protection with the U.S. Bankruptcy Court for the Southern District of Texas. The operator of the Bally Sports group of regional sports networks, which carry local broadcasts for nearly half of the teams in the NBA, NHL and MLB (42 teams in total across 19 channels), had been struggling to reduce around $8 billion in debt acquired through its 2019 purchase of the former Fox Sports Networks from The Walt Disney Company. Diamond's financial health, which was impacted by cord-cutting as well as carriage disputes earlier in the decade that significantly reduced Bally Sports' vMVPD distribution, became an issue after announcements that it had missed a $140 million payment to its lenders in February, and a scheduled rights payment to MLB's Arizona Diamondbacks on March 10. Diamond separates from majority parent Sinclair Broadcast Group as part of the reorganization, and plans to continue to produce and air games. Diamond president Steve Rosenberg subsequently resigned on March 20, succeeded by CFO David DeVoe.	(Note: As part of the restructuring, Diamond Sports Group is expected to terminate less-profitable team contracts, particularly involving MLB teams for which it has been unable to acquire regional streaming rights for its Bally Sports+ service. MLB intends to acquire television rights for any teams contracted to air on selected Bally Sports networks in the event Diamond is unable to make its broadcast rights fee payments or terminates individual deals outright, distributing games from any affected clubs via MLB.tv and a traditional pay television network to be determined. On March 11, the Texas Rangers informed Diamond that it would terminate its media rights deal with Bally Sports Southwest (which syndicates its Rangers telecasts to its sister channels in Oklahoma and New Orleans) in the event of the company's insolvency; Diamond stated it would contest the declaration on grounds it has not missed rights fee payments with the team. Diamond later missed fee payments due to the Cleveland Guardians (carried by Bally Sports Great Lakes) and Minnesota Twins (carried by Bally Sports North) on April 1, and to the Cincinnati Reds (carried by Bally Sports Ohio) due on April 17. On April 20, the U.S. Bankruptcy Court for the Southern District of Texas (which is overseeing Diamond's Chapter 11 restructuring) instructed Diamond to pay half of the payments owed to the Diamondbacks, the Guardians, the Rangers and the Twins before the May 1 grace period deadline; it submitted a fee payment to the Reds on May 2, one day after the team indicated it would reclaim its broadcast rights effective May 6 unless Diamond paid out its 2023 contract before the end of its 15-day grace period. On February 20, Sports Business Journal reported that the NBA quietly renewed its broadcast and streaming contracts with Diamond in June 2022, extending them through the 2024-25 season. Diamond's $10.8 billion purchase of the Fox Sports Networks (renamed Bally Sports in March 2021) was necessitated due to antitrust concerns with Disney's purchase of certain 21st Century Fox assets related to its controlling interest in competitor ESPN Inc.)
14	DirecTV files a lawsuit against Nexstar Media Group, Mission Broadcasting and White Knight Broadcasting with the U.S. District Court for the Southern District of New York, accusing the groups of price fixing through an "illegal conspiracy" to collectively bargain in retransmission fee negotiations using "sidecar" arrangements between Nexstar and the latter two companies meant to skirt FCC regulations (including its local station ownership caps). The suit is in relation to a broader carriage dispute involving 23 Mission and two White Knight stations that were removed from DirecTV, DirecTV Stream and U-verse TV during separate negotiations in October 2022. District Judge P. Kevin Castel dismissed the antitrust lawsuit on standing grounds on March 20, 2024.	(Note: Nexstar Media Group has long maintained outsourcing agreements with affiliate companies like Mission and White Knight, through which Nexstar handles certain operational responsibilities—including advertising sales, newscast production and engineering services—for stations owned by the licensees.)
15	Sports Business Journal reports that Greg Gumbel has signed a contract extension with CBS Sports that would allow the veteran sportscaster to remain studio host for its NCAA basketball coverage while departing from his role as play-by-play announcer for its NFL broadcasts. Outside of the period when the network did not have the NFL (1994–97), Gumbel has been with CBS since 1990 and is the first African-American to handle play-by-play for the Super Bowl. Gumbel did not serve his contract extension, as he was absent from 2024 NCAA basketball coverage and died on December 27, 2024.	
17	Tyra Banks discloses in an interview with TMZ that she resigned as co-host of Dancing with the Stars after three seasons to focus on her business and television production projects. Banks succeeded Tom Bergeron (who had hosted DWTS since its 2005 debut on ABC) and Erin Andrews as sole host of the reality competition series in 2020. On March 20, Julianne Hough (who served as a pro dancer from 2007 to 2009 and as a judge from 2014 to 2017) was named to succeed Banks, alongside returning co-host Alfonso Ribiero, who joined the series in 2022 (coinciding with its move to Disney+).	
17	NBC and the post-production editing staff of Saturday Night Live announce a tentative labor agreement that averts a strike against the variety series that was set for April 1. The staff of 12–20 editors and film managers, who edit pre-taped sketches for SNL, unionized in October 2022, sent contract proposals to NBCUniversal that December, and approved a strike authorization with the Motion Picture Editors Guild on January 23. The deal, whose ratification was announced on March 23, gives the team pay boosts, healthcare benefits, employer-paid meals, and accommodations for those who work long shifts with short turnarounds.	
18	KCBS–KCAL/Los Angeles weekend morning meteorologist Alissa Carlson Schwartz faints on-air just prior to presenting a weather segment during the CBS-owned duopoly's Saturday morning newscast. The rest of the broadcast was preempted following the incident, with both stations (which simulcast portions of the newscast) airing pre-recorded and paid programming in its place. Carlson (who, while employed at NBC affiliate KGET/Bakersfield, was diagnosed with a heart valve leak after vomiting on-set during a weather report in 2014) was treated for a head injury, and later revealed in a March 21 interview with CBS Mornings that the fainting spell was induced by vasovagal syncope likely triggered by dehydration.	
24	Sinclair Broadcast Group lays off 30+ news department employees and cancels certain local newscasts produced by NBC affiliates WPMI/Mobile (operated under an SSA with Deerfield Media) and WEYI/Saginaw–Flint (operated under an SSA with Howard Stirk Holdings), Fox affiliate WACH/Columbia, and Fox/ABC affiliate WGXA/Macon, and shuts down the news department of ABC affiliate KAEF/Arcata–Eureka, California. WPMI cut more than 20 members of its approximately 30-person news staff, and discontinued its weekday morning and noon newscasts as well as the lifestyle program Gulf Coast Today; WEYI cut six production staffers, and cancels its weekday morning and weekend evening newscasts; WACH cancels its four-hour morning newscast; and WGXA cut nine production staffers, reduces its hour-long weeknight 5:00 p.m. newscast to a half-hour and cancels its Sunday–Thursday 10:00 p.m. newscast. On April 3, most of the affected stations replaced some or all of the affected newscasts with Sinclair's syndicated national newscast, The National Desk (with WACH replacing the first hour of its morning newscast with a repeat of its 10:00 p.m. newscast, and WPMI replacing its local midday programs with additional runs of Family Feud), while KAEF began simulcasting newscasts from Redding parent station KRCR (retaining two Eureka-based reporters to file reports for those broadcasts).	(Note: WPMI continues to produce early- and late-evening newscasts seven nights a week, WACH continues to produce half-hour 5:00 and 11:00 p.m. newscasts on weekdays and an hour-long 10:00 p.m. newscast seven nights a week, WGXA continues to produce a half-hour 5:00 p.m. newscast as well as weekday morning and evening newscasts for its ABC-affiliated DT2 subchannel, and WEYI continues to produce 6:00 and 11:00 p.m. newscast on weekdays as well as a nightly 10:00 p.m. newscast for Fox-affiliated sister WSMH.)
26	The United States Army pauses its recently launched advertising campaign featuring on-screen narrator Jonathan Majors, which revives its classic "Be All You Can Be" ad slogan, one day after the actor's arrest on misdemeanor domestic violence charges in connection to a March 24 domestic dispute, in which Majors allegedly physically assaulted a woman he was dating, resulting in her sustaining minor head and neck injuries. New ads in the campaign, which do not feature Majors, would premiere the following weekend.	
27	Chanel West Coast announces her departure from MTV's Ridiculousness after signing a deal to develop, produce, and star in unscripted projects for MTV parent Paramount Media Networks and its MTV Entertainment Group subsidiary. Chanel had co-presented the comedic clip show, alongside Steelo Brim and lead host Rob Dyrdek, since its premiere in 2011.	
27	The 2023 iHeartRadio Music Awards airs from the Dolby Theatre.	
28	One day after The Bachelor's 27th season concludes, Mike Fleiss announces his departure from the Bachelor franchise he created and had produced since the first Bachelor season on ABC in 2002. Claire Freeland, Jason Ehrlich, and Bennett Graebner are immediately appointed to oversee the dating game show franchise, which also includes The Bachelorette and Bachelor in Paradise. Though Fleiss, ABC, and Warner Bros. Television Studios (the franchise's producer) were tight-lipped as to the reason for his departure, a Variety report later indicated that Fleiss was the subject of an investigation, conducted by an outside party, into allegations of bullying and racially discriminatory behaviors.	

== April ==
Date	Event	Source
2	The LSU Tigers defeat the Iowa Hawkeyes to win the championship of the 2023 NCAA Division I women's basketball tournament. Simulcasts of the game on ABC and ESPN2 drew a combined 9.9 million viewers, the largest ever television audience for a women's college basketball game.	
2	The 2023 CMT Music Awards airs on CBS from the Moody Center in Austin, Texas, with Kane Brown and Kelsea Ballerini as hosts. In addition to co-hosting, Kane Brown won the Video of the Year award for his collaboration with wife Katelyn Brown, "Thank God". Jelly Roll was the top winner of the night, with three awards (all for his single "Son of a Sinner").	
3	The UConn Huskies top the San Diego State Aztecs in the title game of the 2023 NCAA Division I men's basketball tournament. The CBS broadcast attracted 14.693 million viewers, a record low for the championship event. The broadcast is also Jim Nantz's last college basketball assignment for CBS; though he remains the network's lead play-by-play announcer for NFL and PGA golf events, Nantz retires from college basketball after calling 32 consecutive tournaments for CBS and Turner Sports. Ian Eagle succeeds Nantz as CBS' lead college basketball announcer in the 2023–24 season. This also marks the first Men's Final Four to be overseen by Charlie Baker, who was appointed president of the NCAA in December 2022 to succeed Mark Emmert (who announced his retirement in April of that year).	
3	Frontier Communications removes three networks (Newsmax Media-owned Newsmax TV, and Fuse Media-owned Fuse and FM) from its systems, after declining to negotiate new agreements with their respective parent companies. The dispute involving Newsmax comes two weeks after DirecTV ended a two-month dispute with the conservative news and commentary channel, and 4 1/2 months after Frontier removed its archconservative competitor One America News Network in a similar dispute.	
3	American Idol season 21 contestant Sara Beth Liebe abruptly quits during the Hollywood Week round, citing the need to be with her children. Liebe called out Katy Perry on social media two weeks prior for a controversial "mom-shaming" joke that the singer made during her initial audition, in which she remarked that Liebe, after revealing she was a mother of three at age 25, had been "laying on the table too much."	
5	Hearst Television announces it would purchase NBC affiliate WBBH/Fort Myers from Waterman Broadcasting for $220.54 million, pending FCC approval. The purchase, which includes the LMA rights to Montclair Communications-owned ABC sister WZVN, marks the family-owned Waterman's exit from broadcasting (the group, originally founded in 1956 as a radio station operator, had owned WBBH since 1978), and gives Hearst its fifth station in Florida, alongside its existing properties in Orlando (WESH/WKCF), West Palm Beach (WPBF) and Tampa (WMOR). The sale was completed on June 30.	
12	As part of a multi-year agreement that also extends their existing carriage contracts for the group's 25 CBS and 16 MyNetworkTV stations as well as Comet, Sinclair Broadcast Group and YouTube TV announce that the vMVPD service will add Tennis Channel and its companion AVOD streaming channel T2, and digital multicast networks Charge! and TBD to its lineup, effective June 1. This would later be followed on July 19 by a similar deal between Sinclair and Hulu to add the three networks as well as Comet to the service's vMVPD offering in January 2024.	
12	PBS and many of its member stations suspend activity on Twitter after the social messaging platform labeled the service's accounts as "government-funded media." The designation had earlier been given to NPR, which suspended posts the day prior amid a broader dispute that began on April 4, when Twitter first relabeled the counterpart radio service under the "state-affiliated media" classification previously given only to news agencies influenced or controlled by autocratic governments. PBS and NPR, which are editorially independent, consider both labels to be misleading and meant to undermine their credibility; both public broadcasters are funded primarily through donations from viewers as well as corporate and philanthropic donors, while government appropriations to the Corporation for Public Broadcasting account for >1% of their overall funding. (Other public broadcasters, including the BBC and CBC/Radio-Canada, have also criticized or paused activity on Twitter after being assigned the label.)	
13	The studios of WWMT/Kalamazoo–Grand Rapids were evacuated around 2:30 p.m. ET, after a Greenville man with a history of mental illness threatened to kill himself with a bomb he claimed to have in his backpack. (Authorities later confirmed that they only found an iPhone charger and wiring in the backpack.) The suspect (who initially said he was submitting a news tip) forced his way through the front door of the Sinclair-owned CBS/CW affiliate's lobby when chief engineer George Markle moved to barricade the suspect between both lobby doors, and helped evacuate station staff from the building. After two hours, the suspect surrendered to police and was taken to the Kalamazoo County Jail.	
16	Due to a 90-minute delay over what is later revealed to be an overlooked technical bug, Netflix aborts plans to live-stream the Season 4 reunion special of dating series Love is Blind. The special would have been the streamer's second-ever live event (after Chris Rock: Selective Outrage, which ran without error on March 4). The reunion is recorded and released on a tape delay the following day.	
18	Avoiding a trial in Delaware Superior Court that already had a jury empaneled and sworn in, Dominion Voting Systems and Fox News announce a $787.5 million settlement agreement in the former company's defamation lawsuit over the latter's airing of baseless claims that Dominion's voting machines switched votes cast for Donald Trump in the 2020 presidential election to Joe Biden, one of several conspiracy theories spread by Trump, his supporters and many conservative media outlets to explain his defeat by Biden. Dominion had been seeking $1.6 billion in damages. Though the settlement does not require them to apologize on-air, Fox News does acknowledge in a statement that "the Court's rulings [found] certain claims about Dominion to be false."	
19	The news-gathering helicopters of Griffin Media's two Oklahoma CBS affiliates sustain damage from a supercell thunderstorm that spawned at least nine tornadoes across the central section of the state. While covering an EF3 tornado that caused extensive damage in Cole, three-inch hailstones knocked out the windshield of a Bell 407 operated by Oklahoma City flagship KWTV; pilot Jim Gardner and photographer Rich Kriegel, who were both on board, were not injured. An EF2 tornado which struck Shawnee later that evening damaged the tail rotor and roof of a Bell 206 B3 JetRanger operated by Tulsa sister KOTV (which was being housed in a hangar for maintenance and required inspection) at the city's airport.	
20	The WNBA announces a multi-year deal with the E. W. Scripps Company that would see Ion Television air regular season doubleheaders, along with regional telecasts (airing in early- or late-evening broadcast windows) carried on selected Ion O&Os, on Friday nights starting with the 2023 season. Ion's initial slate of 44 WNBA-produced games airs over 15 weeks from May 26 to September 8. The deal gives Ion its first national sports telecasts since a three-event UFC preliminary fight deal in 2010–11, and marks the first rights deal ever signed by Scripps Sports, which was formed in December 2022 to acquire sports events for Ion and Scripps's local television stations.	
20	Fox News announces it has fired conservative commentator Dan Bongino, who hosted the Saturday prime time show Unfiltered for the network as well as the Fox Nation program Canceled in the USA. According to Bongino, the move was due to a breakdown in contract negotiations and not related to Fox's settlement with Dominion Voting Systems.	
21	Paramount Global agrees to a $167.5 million settlement of a case stemming from the 2019 merger of CBS Corporation and Viacom filed by former CBS shareholders against some of the company's former officers and directors (including vice-chairperson Shari Redstone and acting CEO Joseph Ianniello) over alleged breaches of fiduciary duties related to the merger negotiation and approval.	
23	NBCUniversal CEO Jeff Shell departs the company following a third-party investigation into a complaint relating to an inappropriate relationship that Shell had with a female employee. Comcast president Michael J. Cavanagh would assume management responsibilities for the division until a successor is appointed. CNBC anchor and senior international correspondent Hadley Gamble (who lodged the complaint alleging sexual harassment by Shell, and allegations of bullying and discrimination by members of CNBC World's management team in March that led to investigations into both matters) would subsequently reach an agreement with NBCUniversal to depart the network on May 9.	
24	Fox News fires Tucker Carlson, permanently ending Tucker Carlson Tonight with the April 21 broadcast (which ended with the expectation that it would be back the following Monday). The dismissals of Carlson and senior executive producer Justin Wells, reportedly directed by Fox Corporation executive chairman/CEO Lachlan Murdoch and Fox News Media CEO Suzanne Scott to Fox chairman Rupert Murdoch, are tied to a discrimination lawsuit by producer Abby Grossberg (who was fired in March, and would go on to settle the litigation for $12 million on June 30), alleging she was subjected to bullying and antisemitic comments while working on the program, and was coerced by company lawyers to provide misleading testimonial answers in the Dominion Voting Systems defamation lawsuit settled six days prior. Private text messages that Carlson sent to colleagues (expressing skepticism of election fraud claims made by former president Donald Trump's attorneys, criticizing the network for "jeopardizing" its credibility by amplifying the claims, and revealing that he hated Trump "passionately") were among the internal messages made public through the Dominion lawsuit that were widely seen as exposing Fox to greater legal liability. Carlson's former 8:00 p.m. ET slot was temporarily filled by Fox News Tonight, which was hosted by a rotation of network personalities; Jesse Watters Primetime took over the hour on July 17, as part of a broader prime time realignment that also saw timeslot changes for The Ingraham Angle and Gutfeld! (with Ingraham being moved to Watters' former 7:00 p.m. ET slot). Carlson would debut a conservative commentary video series on Twitter on June 6, prompting a cease and desist notice issued by Fox News one week later, citing a non-compete clause in his former contract that runs until early 2025.	
24	CNN fires anchor Don Lemon, following a series of controversies over his on-air remarks and treatment of network colleagues, and an April 5 Variety report that outlined allegations of mistreatment toward several former female colleagues (including Nancy Grace, Kyra Phillips and Soledad O'Brien) and instances of "diva-like behavior" during his 17-year career at CNN. Lemon was earlier criticized for remarks about Nikki Haley, which were widely perceived as sexist, on the February 16 edition of CNN This Morning, suggesting the former United Nations ambassador and South Carolina governor was not a viable presidential candidate because she "isn't in her prime", referencing a comment Haley made during her declaratory speech the day prior that implied President Joe Biden and her rival for the 2024 Republican nomination, Donald Trump (then 80 and 76, respectively), were too old to hold office.	(Note: Lemon had co-anchored CNN This Morning since its November 2022 debut, after being moved from his prime time show, Don Lemon Tonight (originally titled CNN Tonight with Don Lemon from 2014 to 2021).)
24	The Walt Disney Company conducts a second round of layoffs affecting hundreds of employees, including ABC Current Programming SVP Stacey Adams, Freeform programming development SVP Julie Jarmon, and Disney Branded Television unscripted programming VP Marc Buhaj, and 20th Television SVP and Current Programming co-chief Dana Sharpless; FiveThirtyEight founder/CEO Nate Silver would also depart at the end of his contract later this year as part of cuts to the ABC News unit. The company would also combine the current programming and development teams of Disney Television Animation, and dissolve digital content division 20th Digital Studio, Disney Media Distribution's first-run syndication unit and Disney Television Studios's marketing division (marketing responsibilities for programs produced by its studio units would be handled by the company's television and streaming properties).	
24	Concluding an expansion that began on April 1 (when it replaced overnight drama series and infomercials with repeats of its evening talk and analysis shows), NewsNation permanently switches to a 24-hour all-news schedule on weekdays: the Nexstar-owned network debuts a four-hour rolling afternoon news block, NewsNation Now (replacing crime dramas in that slot), and an hour-long political news show, The Hill (a broadcast extension of the co-owned publication, replacing an hour of NewsNation Rush Hour). The expansion coincides with the unveiling of a new studio at its New York bureau in the Daily News Building (where co-operated CW affiliate WPIX also christened a separate studio on that date). Syndicated scripted series acquired before the former WGN America began its gradual format shift from entertainment to news in February 2021 (such as Blue Bloods and Last Man Standing) and time-brokered programs will continue to air on weekends outside of prime time until late 2024, when NewsNation plans to switch to all-news programming full-time.	
25	A man carrying an electric guitar and a handwritten sign (reading "Free Billie Eilish", and referencing a dark web conspiracy theory regarding the CIA's infamous MKUltra experimentation program and ex-Illuminati "insider" Donald Marshall) climbed onto a digital billboard on KTLA/Los Angeles's landmark auxiliary transmission tower outside its Sunset Bronson Studios facility. (The Nexstar-owned CW affiliate's promotional billboard was subsequently turned off temporarily for safety reasons.) The man descended from the tower after about three hours, as firefighters and LAPD crisis negotiators sought to get him down an adjacent ladder. He was arrested on a suspicion of trespassing complaint.	
26	Facebook Watch announces the cancellation of Red Table Talk, the streaming service's last remaining original program, with its producers seeking a new service for future episodes of the talk show. The move comes amid ongoing layoffs at Facebook Watch parent Meta Platforms (which included that of Mina Lefevre, Facebook Watch's head of development and programming) and a shift in emphasis by Meta toward content for its Horizon Worlds virtual reality service.	
26	ESPN fires baseball reporter Marly Rivera for calling fellow reporter Ivón Gaete a "fucking cunt" in a heated caught-on-tape exchange on April 18, after Rivera alleged Gaete tried to interview Aaron Judge, despite the former having had been scheduled to interview the New York Yankees outfielder.	
26	Oklahoma Governor Kevin Stitt vetoes H.B. 2820, a bill that would extend authorization for the Oklahoma Educational Television Authority, the state's PBS member network, through July 1, 2026. Although Stitt later alleged the veto was over objections to LGBTQ+ content on certain PBS programs that he claims "indoctrinat[es]" and "overly sexualizes" children (harkening rhetoric of a broader ongoing culture war over LGBTQ+ rights), the bill is one of over 20 measures (some passed unanimously by the state's House and Senate) that he elected to veto in a broader impasse with Senate leaders over his education and tax proposals, which, in addition to increasing education funding and teacher salaries, would also create a voucher-like tax credit program. The veto of H.B. 2820 (which, had it not received the required two-thirds support of both legislative chambers to override it, would have resulted in OETA's agency authorization expiring on July 1 and the member network shutting down when its existing funding appropriations lapsed in July 2024) was overridden by the legislature on May 25 (the penultimate day of its 2023 session), passing the House, 73–23, and the Senate, 38–6.	(Note: The legislation grants authority to OETA in accordance with the Oklahoma Sunset Law, which includes provisions that would allow the Oklahoma Legislature to allocate funding for the namesake OETA state agency through July 2024, independently of securing its full authorization to operate. Stitt (who approved funding for OETA four times during his first term, including one passed in 2020 that runs through July 1) previously vetoed House Bill 1009XX, a bill that would have provided $8.1 million to fund the replacement of transmitters used to relay emergency alert messages via its Warning, Alert and Response Network (WARN), in October 2022.)
26	A red-tailed hawk fatally collided with a Bell 206 JetRanger operated by WPLG/Miami as the helicopter flew over Pembroke Pines en route to cover a story during the BH Media-owned ABC affiliate's noon newscast. Pilot Mark Lewis and photographer Joe Brennan were not injured, and the helicopter (which sustained damage to its cockpit window) landed safely.	
27	Just shy of a year after announcing his departure, James Corden hosts The Late Late Show for the 1,193rd and final time. Will Ferrell and Harry Styles are the guests on the finale, which also featured a pre-recorded farewell message from President Joe Biden and a dream sequence sketch that included appearances by fellow current and former late night hosts Stephen Colbert, Jimmy Fallon, Jimmy Kimmel, Seth Meyers, David Letterman and Trevor Noah. The last episode of Corden's 8 1/2-year run as host (which was preceded earlier that night by the show's final prime time Carpool Karaoke special) also served as the series finale of the CBS late night talk franchise, which debuted in January 1995 with Tom Snyder as its original host. After airing reruns of The Late Late Show for the remainder of spring and summer, the timeslot was filled by reruns and unaired episodes of the comedy panel show Comics Unleashed starting in September until mid-January of the next year.	
27	Sinclair Broadcast Group announces it would cancel full-length newscasts and lay off all news department staff at CBS affiliate KTVL/Medford, Oregon, and CBS/Fox affiliate KPTH/Sioux City, and discontinue partially outsourced newscasts on NBC affiliate WNWO/Toledo (co-produced by CBS sister WSBT/South Bend since March 2017), CBS affiliate WGFL/Gainesville, Florida (co-produced by CBS sister WPEC/West Palm Beach since October 2019), and Fox affiliate KPTM/Omaha (co-produced by Fox sister KMPH/Fresno since 2013), effective May 12. The National Desk replaced newscasts on all five stations starting May 15. The cuts, as well as reductions in news production at five other stations (see March 24 entry), are believed to be related to the recent bankruptcy of Sinclair-controlled Bally Sports parent Diamond Sports Group.	(Note: KTVL will continue to provide local weather updates presented by meteorologists from Eugene-based NBC sister KMTR during the Sinclair-syndicated national newscast and CBS Mornings.)
27	CNN announces that Dana Bash would be the new anchor for the weekday edition of Inside Politics, while John King who had anchored the program since its revival in 2014, would be moved to a reporting project for the 2024 presidential election. Dash continues to anchor State of the Union on Sundays with Jake Tapper. Dash's first Inside Politics broadcast aired on June 12.	
28	Phoenix's professional basketball teams, the NBA's Suns and the WNBA's Mercury, reach agreements with Gray Television to air their regionally televised games on independents KTVK and KPHE-LD, and with interactive video provider Kiswe to livestream their games on team-specific subscription streaming services. The deal (which was slated to begin with a Mercury-Minnesota Lynx preseason game on May 25 and last five years for the Suns and two for the Mercury) would see the Gray stations maintain exclusivity over certain Suns and Mercury games, feature team-related programs on KTVK and KPHE, and have the content distributed throughout Arizona across KTVK's translator network and Gray-owned KPHE repeaters in Tucson (KOLD-DT5) and Yuma–El Centro (soon-to-launch KAZS). The Suns and Mercury are the first major-league teams to end their television partnerships with Bally Sports since the March 14 bankruptcy of parent Diamond Sports Group, whose Bally Sports Arizona has carried Suns and Mercury games since 2003 and 2006, respectively. (The Suns were last on over-the-air local TV when the team ended its contract with MyNetworkTV O&O KUTP in 2011.) U.S. Bankruptcy Court Judge Christopher Lopez, who is overseeing Diamond's bankruptcy proceedings, would void the Gray deal on May 10, on the basis that the Suns and Mercury violated rules that froze Diamond's rights with the teams and gave them a right of first refusal to match the deal, while in bankruptcy. Diamond effectively reversed course on July 13, declining to submit an offer matching the Gray deal to retain the Suns/Mercury rights before that day's deadline.	(Note: Although all Phoenix Suns games will require a subscription to stream live, under the terms of the deal, the Phoenix Mercury will stream its games free of charge for its 2023 season. KUTP acquired local over-the-air rights to broadcast Phoenix Suns games in 1987, taking over the contractual rights from then-Fox affiliate KNXV-TV (now an ABC affiliate).)
30	During ABC's coverage of Game 1 in the Miami Heat–New York Knicks playoff series, a bumper shown during the telecast included stock footage with the original towers of the World Trade Center in the background. After complaints from viewers, ESPN said it "mistakenly used an old stock image and we apologize."	

== May ==
Date	Event	Source
1	Two days after the conclusion of the 2023 NFL draft, Xfinity removes NFL Network from its systems after failing to reach a contract renewal agreement prior to its expiration. The blackout ends the following day, reportedly resolved after a phone discussion between NFL Commissioner Roger Goodell and Comcast CEO Brian Roberts conducted the previous afternoon.	
1	As part of a multi-year agreement that also extends their existing carriage contracts for the company's 90 ABC, NBC, CBS and Fox stations and NewsNation, Nexstar Media Group and Hulu announce that the latter will begin carrying additional Nexstar-run stations serving 32 markets (consisting of 26 MyNetworkTV and four independent stations, including WGN-TV/Chicago, KRON/San Francisco, WPHL/Philadelphia, WTTA/Tampa–St. Petersburg, KAUT/Oklahoma City and WDVM/Hagerstown–Washington, D.C.) to its vMVPD service's lineup. Although some of Nexstar's 29 CW affiliates were reportedly added to Hulu beginning in February, the terms of the deal do not specify whether carriage of other CW stations operated by Nexstar were included as part of the agreement.	
2	The Writers Guild of America commences a strike against television and film studios, its first labor stoppage since 2007 and the largest production stoppage for the American entertainment industry since 2020, after the union and the Alliance of Motion Picture and Television Producers failed to agree on a new contract by the WGA's May 1 renewal deadline. The WGA sought increases in compensation and residuals, and greater protections for over-scale pay (citing a decline in pay despite the expansion of content with the rise of streaming services in recent years that effectively created a "gig economy" for unionized writers), staffing requirements for television shows to employ a certain number of writers for a specified period of time (regardless of need for specific episodes), curbs on mini-rooms (where groups of writers outline story breakdowns and write scripts), and restrictions on chatbot scriptwriting. The strike immediately halted production of late night talk and variety shows; and, just as how the Fall network schedules were impacted by the 1981 and 1988 strikes in addition to being compounded by the concurring SAG–AFTRA strike that would begin on July 14, halted or delayed development and production of scripted series for the 2023–24 network schedule (resulting in unscripted programs, and acquired foreign, cable and streaming series occupying much of the Fall schedule), along with cable and streaming programs that have uncompleted episodes. At the outset, prime time network schedules were not significantly disrupted at the strike's commencement (after production on most scripted network shows for the 2022–23 season had already concluded). As well, some shows that employed paerticipating WGA members continued production, either without pre-written material (including talk shows The View, The Kelly Clarkson Show and Gutfeld!) or using fi-core and non-union writers to continue ongoing and planned storylines (as soap operas had done during previous strikes). The WGA would declare the strike over effective at 12:01AM on September 27, three days after the Guild and AMPTP reached a tentative agreement that was approved by Guild leadership on September 26, and allowing its rank and file to return to work while they perform a ratification vote.	(Note: At 148 days, the 2023 Writers Guild of America strike was the second longest in the union's history (only the 153-day strike in 1988 was longer).)
2	A man fires an automatic-style rifle into a glass door panel outside the front lobby of WHBQ/Memphis around 11:30 a.m. CT. The suspect, who had a history of mental illness, and was in the midst of a mental episode that family and friends reportedly intended to seek help for that day, had earlier informed an employee of the Imagicomm-owned Fox affiliate that he was carrying a gun while talking to them outside the studio's front gate. Employees were evacuated to a back parking lot for around 30 minutes as police secured the area; no one was injured. The suspect was arrested about two hours later at a nearby burger restaurant, where he was barricaded inside a bathroom and posted a Facebook Live video, in which he insisted on speaking with "news people" about alleged evidence into corruption in the Memphis Police Department.	(Note: The suspect, Jarrad Nathan, was identified to Memphis police officers as the shooter by family members.)
4	The NHL's Vegas Golden Knights sign a multi-year agreement with the E. W. Scripps Company's Scripps Sports division to air their regionally-televised games on Ion O&O KMCC/Laughlin–Las Vegas (which becomes an independent station). The deal, effective with the 2023–24 season, replaces AT&T SportsNet Rocky Mountain as the Knights' television partner and expands the team's local relationship with Scripps (KMCC sister station KTNV has carried the Knights' preseason and ABC-televised regular season games since the team's inaugural 2017–18 season, concurrent with its AT&T SportsNet contract). Scripps syndicates the Knights telecasts to stations across the team's broadcast territory, including the company's stations in Boise, Salt Lake City and Montana. The Knights are the first major-league team to depart from AT&T SportsNet since its parent, Warner Bros. Discovery, announced its intent to exit the RSN business.	
4	Gray Television fires South Dakota State Capitol reporter Austin Goss (who filed reports for KOTA–KEVN/Rapid City and KSFY–KDLT/Sioux Falls) following his arrest on charges of making "threatening, harassing or misleading contacts" tied to a January 23 prank call he made to former South Dakota State Senator and Republican Party chairman Dan Lederman by spoofing the personal cell phone number of Governor Kristi Noem, which a state investigation found that Goss may have obtained during "personal and professional" communications with her.	
5	NBC Sports California suspends veteran Oakland Athletics play-by-play announcer Glen Kuiper, after he appeared to refer to the Negro Leagues Baseball Museum as the "nigger league museum" during the pre-game show for that night's away game against the Kansas City Royals at Kauffman Stadium. Kuiper apologized for the remarks (which he made while discussing a visit he and broadcast partner Dallas Braden made to the museum earlier that day) following a commercial break at the top of the sixth inning. The A's denounced Kuiper's remarks in a statement on Twitter, calling his use of the slur "unacceptable." Kuiper was fired by NBC Sports California on May 22.	
6	The coronation of King Charles III and Queen Camilla is televised on all major broadcast networks, cable news channels and BBC America. The ceremony was watched cumulatively by 10.9 million viewers according to Nielsen, with ABC's coverage leading all networks with 3.04 million viewers.	
7	The 2023 MTV Movie & TV Awards are broadcast on MTV and its sister networks, with Scream VI (Best Movie) and The Last of Us (Best Show) among the notable winners. Originally planned as a live ceremony (from the Barker Hangar in Santa Monica, California), the event airs instead as a prerecorded presentation in the wake of several attendees, and previously announced emcee Drew Barrymore, withdrawing in solidarity with striking WGA members, as well as plans by the Guild to picket the event. (Barrymore, who still appeared on the broadcast in pre-recorded skits, has agreed to host the ceremony in 2024.)	
8	Nexstar Media Group announces it would acquire independent station KUSI/San Diego from McKinnon Broadcasting for $35 million. The deal would create a duopoly with Fox affiliate KSWB (the first such duopoly in the San Diego market), and marks the family-owned McKinnon's exit from broadcasting (McKinnon, which was founded in 1962, had launched KUSI in 1982 and the station was its last television property following the 2010 sale of KIII/Corpus Christi to London Broadcasting Company). Nexstar plans to turn KUSI into a CW affiliate once its contract with Tegna-owned KFMB-DT2 (which runs through September 2026) expires or is terminated early.	(Note: Prior to the elimination of the rule through a 2021 Supreme Court decision that upheld modifications to media ownership rules made by the agency four years prior, the San Diego market—largely because several full-power channel allocations were reserved by Mexico's Federal Telecommunications Institute (and the predecessor Federal Commission of Telecommunications) to the nearby Tijuana area—did not have enough full-power television stations to permit a duopoly under the FCC's "Eight Voices test" requirement.)
9	Paramount Media Networks announces it would shut down MTV News as part of broader layoffs and cost-cutting at the company, affecting 25% of the company's U.S.-based staff. Launched in 1987 but affected by downsizing in its later years, MTV's news and documentary division was noted for its coverage of music, politics, lifestyle, and pop culture that was geared toward the network's younger audiences. Paramount Global also announces the consolidation of Showtime Networks and MTV Entertainment Studios into a single "studio" unit, and the nine separate operations teams of the Paramount Media Networks cable channels into one portfolio group.	
10	CNN's Kaitlan Collins moderated a town hall with Donald Trump at Saint Anselm College in Goffstown, New Hampshire, in front of an audience primarily made of likely Republican primary voters. The former president and 2024 Republican presidential candidate made numerous false claims (including repeating voter fraud allegations in his 2020 presidential election loss); reiterated his support of the 2021 U.S. Capitol attack; credited himself for appointing three of the six Supreme Court justices who overruled the landmark Roe v. Wade abortion ruling in the 2022 Dobbs v. Jackson Women's Health Organization decision; and sidestepped questions about whom he supported in the Russian invasion of Ukraine and if he supported a national abortion ban during the event. Warner Bros. Discovery CEO David Zaslav and CNN Global CEO Chris Licht defended the decision to hold the town hall; however, media observers, CNN staffers, and Trump critics across the political spectrum denounced it for appearing to "normalize" his candidacy, despite Trump being the subject of multiple criminal and civil cases (including federal and state investigations into his attempts to overturn the 2020 election, and a New York civil trial that concluded the day prior, in which he was found liable of sexually abusing and defaming former Elle columnist E. Jean Carroll, remarks about whom Trump made during the event were amended into a separate defamation lawsuit against Trump, filed by Carroll in 2019, on May 22), and his tendency to make false claims and spread disinformation. In response to the event, legal commentator Tristan Snell said he would no longer appear on CNN under its current leadership. The town hall was watched by 3.1 million viewers according to Nielsen, lower than that of the network's July 2022 town hall with President Joe Biden (3.7 million).	
11	The 58th Academy of Country Music Awards airs on Prime Video from the Ford Center at The Star.	
15	WideOpenWest announces it would discontinue its in-house pay television services, Ultra TV (a traditional pay-TV service relying on QAM/IP-based set-top boxes that launched in 2011) and WOW TV+ (an IPTV service using Android TV infrastructure that launched in March 2020), and migrate its remaining video customers (totaling 117,100 subscribers as of Q1 2023, a 6.2% decline from Q4 2022) to YouTube TV, under a partnership that wo3 see the Alphabet-owned vMVPD provider be offered as part of WOW!'s Internet bundle, beginning that Summer.	(Note: WideOpenWest ceased active marketing of WOW! tv+ in June 2020, in favor of marketing YouTube TV and rival vMVPD providers fuboTV, Sling TV and Philo to its subscribers.)
15	Country singer Reba McEntire, who earlier served as an advisor in the Knockout rounds for the 23rd season of The Voice, was announced to succeed outgoing coach Blake Shelton (the last of the NBC music competition series' four original coaches, who earlier announced his departure prior to the Season 23 premiere) for the 24th season. The semifinals, which followed a real-time voting structure without an "Instant Save" feature for the first time since Season 5, saw both artists coached by Shelton, Grace West and NOVIAS, advancing to the following week's final round; both artists would go on to lose to eventual winner Gina Miles, who was coached by former One Direction member and debuting coach Niall Horan, making him the series' tenth overall winning coach and the third coach to win on their first attempt.	
17	Mission Broadcasting announces it would acquire MyNetworkTV affiliate WADL/Mount Clemens, Michigan from Adell Broadcasting Corp. for $75 million. Clinton Township-based Adell, which signed on WADL in May 1989, will retain ownership of religious broadcaster The Word Network and radio station WFDF/Farmington Hills. Upon closure, Mission intends to contract with partner company Nexstar Media Group to provide operational services for WADL, which it planned to turn into Detroit's affiliate of The CW (a network majority owned by Nexstar); the station briefly affiliated with the network on September 1 (replacing WKBD), before moving to Scripps-owned WMYD due to a dispute between Adell and Mission/Nexstar over their affiliation contract. The sale was approved eleven months later on April 23, 2024; however because of issues concerning Nexstar's management of Mission-owned WPIX/New York City (which resulted in a $1.82-million fine, and a requirement for Mission to sell the station to Nexstar or an independent third-party to comply with FCC ownership rules that the LMA's structure had purportedly violated due to attributable interests in the latter's involvement with WPIX), the approval was conditioned on Nexstar not being involved in financing Mission's purchase of the station, Mission enforcing limits to performance bonuses and ad revenues provided to Nexstar under any LMA between the two groups, the station limiting carriage of Nexstar-provided programming to no more than 15% of the station's weekly programming time (a clause normally applied to local programming provided by a station operator under LMA rules that likely constrains WADL from carrying the full CW schedule as intended, particularly as Scripps plans to disaffiliate from WMYD in September 2024 as part of a chain-wide disaffiliation from the network), and that any SSA cannot include an option for Nexstar to purchase WADL outright.	
17	CNN announces that Kaitlan Collins would become the new permanent host in the weeknight 9:00 p.m. ET timeslot, vacant since the December 2021 firing of Chris Cuomo (see December 4). The Source with Kaitlan Collins debuted on July 9, which replaced the CNN Tonight, later CNN PrimeTime guest host rotation in place from the beginning of December 2021 to May 2023.	
19	Citadel Communications announces that it would sell independent station WSNN-LD/Sarasota, Florida to Nexstar Media Group for $1 million. The transaction, which is expected to be completed by the end of the year, will combine the station with Nexstar's existing Tampa–St. Petersburg duopoly of WFLA (NBC) and WTTA (MyNetworkTV), and marks Citadel's exit from broadcasting; the company—which acquired WSNN in 2009—had owned nine major-network stations in the Midwest and New England (including current Nexstar properties WHBF/Rock Island–Davenport, KCAU/Sioux City and WIVT/Binghamton) at various points from its founding in 1982 until 2019. The sale was finalized on July 20.	
22	Fifteen months to the date after it was first announced, Tegna announces it has terminated its deal to be acquired by hedge fund Standard General. The $8.6-billion deal, which was originally slated to be completed in the second half of 2022, had faced regulatory hurdles (the FCC's Media Bureau had designated the deal for a hearing by an administrative law judge in February), scrutiny from lawmakers and labor unions concerned over job losses (in part because the deal did not address conflicts with stations operated by Cox Media Group—whose majority owner, Apollo Global Management, helped finance the deal—in four markets), and a deadline for Standard General to arrange financing for the deal on this date. As a result of the deal's termination, Tegna (which owns and operates 68 stations in 54 markets) announces a share repurchase plan and the collection of a $136 million termination fee from Standard General.	
23	Netflix begins cracking down on unauthorized password sharing between subscribers and non-paying customers in the U.S. by introducing an $8/month "extra member" option to permit access to users who do not live in the account holder's household, and intending to block devices attempting to access a user's Netflix account without paying over a certain timeframe. Netflix initially tested the "extra member" program (which resulted in account cancellations in countries where paid-sharing has been implemented) to primary account holders in Chile, Costa Rica and Peru in 2022, and formally commenced paid-sharing in Canada, New Zealand, Portugal and Spain In February 2023.	(Note: The restrictions will not apply to Netflix subscribers that access the service on their personal tablets or laptops, or log into a TV (such as at hotels or vacation rental properties) while traveling.)
24	Gray Television files a lawsuit in the Eleventh Circuit Court of Appeals that requests to vacate a $518,283 fine issued by the FCC in July 2021 (which was upheld on appeal in a 3–1 vote by the FCC Media Bureau in October 2022), pertaining to a July 2020 non-license asset deal between Gray and Denali Media Holdings that saw the former acquire and transfer the CBS affiliation rights for Anchorage from KTVA (now a Rewind TV affiliate) to Gray-owned KYES (now KAUU). Because Gray already owned NBC affiliate KTUU, the FCC considered the transaction as equivalent to purchasing a second top-four station in violation of FCC duopoly regulations. Gray—which acquired KAUU (then a lower-rated MyNetworkTV affiliate) in 2016—contends the FCC had no authority to regulate the affiliation purchase as it did not involve a license transfer, that its regulation of a "functional equivalent" to the agency's Top-4 Rule via the fine exceeds the agency's regulatory authority, and that the fine violates the First Amendment by penalizing Gray's programming decisions without furthering a "legitimate" government interest.	
29	Silver Chalice acquires majority control of Stadium from Sinclair Broadcast Group (which co-founded the broadcast/streaming sports network with the Chicago White Sox subsidiary in 2017, as a reconfiguration of Sinclair's American Sports Network syndication service). Sinclair cites that the decision to sell its controlling stake in Stadium was due to insufficient viewership to justify continued financing, refuting a report by Front Office Sports disclosing the purchase that it was tied to financial issues related to the recent bankruptcy of its Diamond Sports Group unit. Stadium would maintain its affiliation agreements with Sinclair-run stations, while Sinclair would continue to supply some programming for the network.	
30	One week after failing to make a rights payment before the end of its fee grace period, Diamond Sports Group informs the San Diego Padres that it would no longer provide financing to Bally Sports San Diego that would enable the regional sports network to continue paying fees to the team. The Padres' local television rights consequently reverted to the team and Major League Baseball following that evening's game against Miami (the first of a three-game away series), marking the first instance since Diamond's March 14 bankruptcy filing that it returned the local MLB broadcast rights to a franchise. The league took over production of the Padres' regional telecasts starting with the May 31 Padres–Marlins game, and began carrying them on alternate channels on Cox, Spectrum, U-verse, DirecTV and Fubo within the team's home market, along with, for the first time ever, a blackout-free, direct-to-consumer option via MLB.tv. Game announcers Don Orsillo, Mark Grant and Bob Scanlan remains on the broadcasts as they are directly employed by the Padres.	(Note: YurView California—which airs the team's MLB-produced telecasts on Cox Communications' San Diego-area systems—previously acquired local cable rights to broadcast San Diego Padres games in 1997 (as Channel 4 San Diego, which shared the contractual rights with independent station KUSI until 2003). The Padres moved its regional telecasts to Bally Sports San Diego (then Fox Sports San Diego) when the network launched in 2012.)

== June ==
Date	Event	Source
4	Chuck Todd announces that he was resigning as moderator of Meet the Press after nine years. Todd's tenure as moderator, which would end on September 10, saw the NBC program launch into other ventures (including the NBC News Now extension show Meet The Press Now, which Welker co-hosts and had originally debuted on MSNBC in 2015 as MTP Daily, weekly podcasts and a documentary film festival), and Todd himself facing criticism from some viewers and media critics for not pushing back against false statements made by guests (particularly those made by former president Donald Trump, his administration's officials, and his archconservative supporters in political leadership). Todd was succeeded as MTP moderator on September 17 by NBC News White House correspondent Kristen Welker, who moved from the co-anchor chair at Saturday Today to become the political talk show's first female moderator (since co-creator Martha Rountree's 1947–53 tenure as its original host), as well as the first person of color to regularly serve as the program's moderator (Welker is of mixed Black–Caucasian heritage).	
6	The Forum of Fargo-Moorhead reports that Red River Broadcasting has exercised an option to terminate the sale of Fox affiliates KQDS/Duluth–Superior and KVRR/Fargo–Moorhead to Forum Communications. The $24-million deal, first announced in November 2021, was dependent on the FCC approving a waiver of ownership rules prohibiting the combination of two full-power "Big Four" outlets in the same market, in order to allow a duopoly between KVRR and Forum-owned ABC affiliate WDAY. The FCC, which has only once approved such a "Big Four" duopoly (in 2019), had not yet considered the Fargo waiver. (Forum, which also owns The Forum and News Tribune newspapers in the respective cities, would have had no such issues in Duluth as it has no existing television properties in that market.)	(Note: The only granted waiver of the FCC's "top-four" prohibition involved Gray Television's acquisition of NBC affiliate KDLT/Sioux Falls, which Red River Broadcasting sold to Gray in May 2018 for $32.5 million, creating a duopoly with the latter's existing ABC affiliate in that market, KSFY. The Forum acquisition was to have included a waiver to allow the company to purchase KVRR's three satellite stations, KBRR/Thief River Falls, KJRR/Jamestown and KNRR/Pembina, allowing it to operate them alongside WDAY semi-satellite WDAZ/Devils Lake.)
7	Warner Bros. Discovery announces the departure of Chris Licht as CEO of its CNN Global division after just over one year. Licht had already resigned from operational control of the network to WBD Chief Corporate Operating Officer David Leavy in the fallout from the Donald Trump town hall meeting, though the ouster came in the aftermath of the June 2 publication of a less-than-flattering Atlantic article documenting Licht's short but tumultuous tenure at CNN.	
7	Actor Jay Johnston is arrested by the FBI for his alleged involvement in the January 6, 2021, attack on the U.S. Capitol. The comedian/actor (known for his roles in Mr. Show with Bob and David, The Sarah Silverman Program and Bob's Burgers) was charged by the U.S. Department of Justice on counts that include civil disorder, entering or remaining in a restricted building or grounds, disorderly or disruptive conduct in a restricted building or grounds, and impeding passage through Capitol property.	
11	The 76th Tony Awards air on CBS and Paramount+ from New York's United Palace, with Ariana DeBose as host. Notable winners included Kimberly Akimbo (Best Musical), Leopoldstadt (Best Play), and the first two non-binary performers to win acting awards (J. Harrison Ghee for Some Like It Hot and Alex Newell for Shucked). The ceremony and telecast were initially postponed on May 12 after organizers for the Tonys were denied a waiver request from the Writers Guild of America to use pre-written material during the Guild's strike against the Alliance of Motion Picture and Television Producers (both CBS and Paramount+ are AMPTP members). But by May 16, organizers agree to ceremony alterations (including refraining from using a script and placing an emphasis on live performances from Tony-nominated shows) and allowed the event to proceed without a WGA waiver or picket line.	
12	The Denver Nuggets defeat the Miami Heat, 94–89, in Game 5 of the 2023 NBA Finals to win their first championship in franchise history; the Nuggets, in their first-ever Finals appearance, defeated the Heat in four of five games in the best-of-seven series; ABC carried the NBA Finals exclusively for the 21st consecutive year. This year's NBA playoffs, which began on April 15 (and were televised on TNT, ESPN, ABC and NBA TV—with each team's regional broadcaster also televising local coverage of First Round games, except for most weekend games that ABC televised nationally), saw ESPN/ABC carry the Western Conference Finals and TNT carry the Eastern Conference Finals, per the alternating exclusivity rotation under the NBA's contracts with ESPN Inc. and Warner Bros. Discovery Sports.	(Note: Game 3 of the Cleveland Cavaliers–New York Knicks first-round series aired nationally on ABC and within their designated markets on the teams' respective regional sports network partners, Bally Sports Ohio and MSG Network.)
12	Pat Sajak announced on social media that he would retire as host of Wheel of Fortune at the conclusion of its 41st season in mid-2024; he would remain with the program thereafter as a consultant. Sajak has hosted the Sony/CBS-distributed game show since December 1981, when he succeeded Chuck Woolery on the now-defunct network version (Sajak would leave that version in January 1989, six months prior to its move from NBC to CBS, to host his own late-night talk show for the latter network), and began hosting the syndicated version when it debuted in September 1983. On June 27, it was announced that Ryan Seacrest would succeed Sajak as host for the 2024–25 season.	
12	HFPA was rebranded to Golden Globe Foundation.	
13	The Vegas Golden Knights defeat the Florida Panthers, 9–3, in Game 5 of the 2023 Stanley Cup Final to win their first championship in franchise history; the Golden Knights, which began play in the NHL six years prior, defeated the Panthers in four of five games in the best-of-seven series. TNT, TBS and TruTV simulcasted this year's Stanley Cup Final, per the alternating rotation under the NHL's contracts with ESPN Inc. and Warner Bros. Discovery Sports. It marked both the first time that the three networks carried the championship series and the first time since 1994 (when it was carried nationally by ESPN and regionally by New York City-based MSG) that the Finals aired exclusively on cable in the U.S. This year's Stanley Cup playoffs began on April 17, and was televised on ABC, ESPN, ESPN2, TBS and TNT, with each franchise's regional broadcaster also televising local coverage of First Round games (except for weekend games that ABC televised nationally).	(Note: TBS did not carry the deciding Game 5 of the Stanley Cup Final on June 13, due to a scheduling conflict with a New York Mets–New York Yankees Major League Baseball game telecast, resulting in the Stanley Cup game being simulcast only on TNT and TruTV.)
13	Sports analyst/commentator Shannon Sharpe announces he would be leaving the FS1 morning sports talk show Skip and Shannon: Undisputed, which he has co-hosted since its debut in September 2016, following that day's broadcast. It was then announced that the show would take a hiatus until August 28 due to Fox Sports failing to find a new debate partner with Skip Bayless.	
20	The NBA's Utah Jazz signs a multi-year agreement with Sinclair Broadcast Group to broadcast their regionally televised games and other team-specific programs on the company's Salt Lake City duopoly of KUTV (CBS) and KJZZ (independent), effective with the league's 2023–24 season; the stations replace Warner Bros. Discovery-owned AT&T SportsNet Rocky Mountain and Root Sports Northwest as the Jazz's regional television partners. The deal also marks the team's return to KJZZ, which previously held over-the-air telecast rights to Jazz games from 1993 to 2009. Team owner Ryan Smith's holding company, Smith Entertainment Group, also starts a new in-house production division, SEG Media, to produce the telecasts, which would also be carried on a new subscription streaming service scheduled to launch in October. Game announcers Craig Bolerjack, Thurl Bailey and Holly Rowe remains on the broadcasts as they are directly employed by the Jazz.	(Note: KJZZ was owned by former Jazz owner Larry H. Miller (who died in February 2009) from 1993 to 2016, when the Miller estate sold the station to Sinclair; Miller purchased the station to replace then-Fox O&O (now affiliate) KSTU as the local over-the-air carrier of Utah Jazz games, after the latter chose not to continue its contract after the 1992–93 season.)
21	Television presenter Geraldo Rivera announces he quit the Fox News talk show The Five, which he has co-hosted since January 2022. On June 29, the same day his final episode was scheduled to air, Rivera announced that he would be leaving Fox News entirely after having quit the program; he later alleged in a July 13 appearance on The View that a "toxic [work] relationship" with an unnamed Five co-host led to his departure.	
23	KQED 9/San Francisco's KQED Newsroom ends after 55 years on television. KQED News continues on KQED 88.5 FM, online, and social media platforms.	
25	The 23rd BET Awards airs from the Microsoft Theater.	
27	Roku and CBS Sports announce a multi-year deal to become the exclusive American media partners for the Formula E electric motorsport series. The deal marks the first sports rights agreement for Roku and expands CBS's existing relationship with the promotion; Roku would stream 11 races per season on the Roku Channel and CBS would carry five races per season that would also be streamed on Paramount+, with all races carried by the two streaming services being accessible through Roku's live-streaming sports aggregation platform.	
28	As part of a multi-year agreement that also extends their existing carriage contract for NFL Network and expands its distribution to co-owned DirecTV Stream and U-verse, NFL Media and DirecTV announce that the latter will add NFL RedZone to the lineups of its subscription television services. The addition of RedZone will allow DirecTV subscribers to continue to view regional NFL broadcasts not carried within their home market in some capacity, after the league's December 2022 deal with Google to distribute the package to YouTube TV and YouTube Primetime Channels customers resulted in DirecTV's residential carriage rights to the NFL Sunday Ticket out-of-market sports package ending following the 2022 season.	(Note: EverPass Media, a new investment company funded by RedBird Capital and the NFL, will also distribute NFL Sunday Ticket to bars, restaurants, hotels and other commercial venues via existing cable and satellite providers (including DirecTV, which signed a multi-year agreement with EverPass on May 25, to continue distributing the package to its business customers) under non-exclusive agreements.)
29	Nexstar Media Group fires news director Stanton Tang and assistant news director Amy Fox from NBC affiliate WOOD/Grand Rapids, following an internal investigation into a leaked memo urging reporters and producers to cover fewer stories on West Michigan-area Pride Month events because of criticism from conservative viewers over related stories aired earlier that month on its newscasts. Tang (who, in the memo, had asked reporters to only cover Pride events if considered newsworthy and to pursue viewpoints reflecting "both sides" of the story) had also been accused by station journalists of having his own right-leaning views influence editorial decisions (occasionally sending links to Twitter posts from conservative news outlets and commentators as story ideas in emails to reporters), and of fostering a hostile work environment within the news department (including pressuring and getting into intense arguments with journalists that caused some to take sick leave due to mental anguish, and discouraging them from voting in the 2022 Michigan gubernatorial and U.S. House primaries, only to later acknowledge he voted in that election, in possible violation of voter intimidation laws); prior complaints about Tang's workplace conduct allegedly went unaddressed when brought up to WOOD general manager Julie Brinks and to Nexstar management. News producers Luke Stier and Madeline Odle were also terminated for leaking information about the memo to local media and broadcast industry outlets. Veteran television executive Steven Ackermann was appointed as interim news director on June 30.	
30	In what the network describes as a move meant to "identify additional cost savings," ESPN lays off about 20 on-air personalities. The notable names confirmed on this date to be exiting include NBA analysts Jalen Rose and Jeff Van Gundy; NFL studio analysts Matt Hasselbeck, Keyshawn Johnson, Rob Ninkovich, and Steve Young; NFL draft expert Todd McShay; boxing analyst and This Just In host Max Kellerman; college football analyst David Pollack; college basketball analyst LaPhonso Ellis; veteran reporter/host Suzy Kolber; and SportsCenter anchors Neil Everett and Ashley Brewer. It is the third round of layoffs this year at ESPN, following two waves affecting behind-the-scenes staffers earlier in the Spring.	

== July ==
Date	Event	Source
1	Hawaiian Telcom removes the Honolulu duopoly of Fox/CW affiliate KHON and MyNetworkTV affiliate KHII, and NewsNation from its systems across the state after failing to renew an agreement with Nexstar Media Group that expired on June 30. The provider filed an FCC complaint on July 6, asking for the commission to rule Nexstar's failure to continue the channels' carriage as a violation of good-faith negotiation rules for each day since the previous contract lapsed. Hawaiian Telcom, which noted the Islands' volcanic and mountainous terrain prevents many residents from receiving KHON/KHII over-the-air and alleged that the group sought to increase fees to carry the channels by 80%, accused Nexstar of withholding consent by not responding to its request to extend negotiations by one week, forcing it to remove the channels, until immediately before the agreement expired. The parties reached a multi-year agreement to restore KHON/KHII (along with Rewind TV-affiliated KHON-DT4) and NewsNation to Hawaiian Telcom's lineup on July 20, although the provider stated it would not drop the Nexstar complaint (which it amended the day before to allege the group had unraveled an earlier version of the deal on July 17, demanding Hawaiian Telcom rescind the complaint and not file future FCC complaints against Nexstar).	(Note: The dispute also affected four stations licensed to Hilo and Wailuku that operate as satellites of KHON and KHII: KHON repeaters KHAW and KAII, and KHII repeaters KGMD and KGMV, respectively.)
2	DirecTV removes 159 stations owned by Nexstar Media Group after the two parties fail to reach a new carriage agreement. The impasse results in the complete loss of stations operated by Nexstar and its partner companies (Mission Broadcasting and White Knight Broadcasting) from the DirecTV satellite service, DirecTV Stream and U-verse, amid an existing contractual and legal dispute between DirecTV and Nexstar dating to October 2022, concerning alleged collective bargaining influence by the three station groups in retransmission fee negotiations that prompted the earlier removal of Mission and White Knight's respective stations from the company's television services (see March 14 entry). In a July 18 FCC letter, DirecTV accused CW majority owner Nexstar of forcing Sinclair Broadcast Group to remove 21 affiliates (all based in markets where both groups operate stations, and leaving subscribers of the vMVPD service in those areas unable to view CW programs) from DirecTV Stream on July 12; Nexstar countered that DirecTV Stream continued to carry Sinclair's CW stations without renewing a prior agreement that expired in November 2022. A gradual restoration of the Nexstar stations to DirecTV would begin on September 17, with the companies announcing a new multi-year carriage deal the next day.	
10	Charter Communications announces it would begin offering a reduced-cost tier of its Spectrum TV Select cable package that excludes regional and many national sports networks featured in its standard basic tier (including its own Spectrum Sports channels in areas where Charter also operates an RSN). The Spectrum Select Signature tier, which would gradually launch across most of its footprint beginning in late Summer, alongside the renamed Spectrum Select Plus expanded tier, would be marketed primarily to non-sports fans, and is intended to limit cord-cutting among existing subscribers. The company also plans to launch a subscription streaming service for its Spectrum Sports channels, which would be available at no extra charge to Select Plus subscribers. Concurrently, Charter announces a new carriage agreement with DirecTV for Spectrum SportsNet and SportsNet LA, which lowers the required coverage rates for the two Los Angeles-based networks under terms similar to recent deals that saw the company reduce coverage mandates for owned or third-party regional sports networks carried on its systems (RSNs usually require carriage by at least 80% of a provider's regional subscribers); Charter intends to impose similar provisions for its Spectrum Sports RSNs in future negotiations with other providers, enabling them to reduce programming costs subsidized by their customers.	(Note: Carriage agreements negotiated by RSNs have typically required their inclusion in highly-subscribed base tiers in order to generate additional carriage fees paid by subscribers (including non-sports viewers), though these fees as well as those from other networks (including larger national sports channels) have contributed to cord-cutting in recent years as the cost of programming packages have risen. The Spectrum Select Signature tier will include a limited slate of national sports networks (such as ESPN and FS1) among its channel offerings.)
10	Saima Mohsin, who served as an international correspondent for the network from 2013 to 2017, sues CNN for racial discrimination and wrongful termination. The journalist (who became a freelance presenter for Sky News in 2022) suffered severe tissue damage after a cameraman accompanying her on assignment accidentally drove over her foot while covering the Israel-Palestine conflict in 2014. Moshin (who is British Pakistani) alleges that the network refused to provide adequate accommodations for her injury, which left her unable to do more physically demanding reporting work, and denied her request to move to an anchor role (alleging an executive said she didn't "have the look we are looking for") and other on-air opportunities in favor of white American correspondents.	
12	The 2023 ESPY Awards airs from the Dolby Theatre on ABC.	
13	The Atlantic Coast Conference announces a four-year deal with The CW, under which the network will broadcast a total of 50 ACC college football and basketball games (initially consisting of 13 football, 28 men's basketball and nine women's basketball games) each season through the 2026–27 academic year. Raycom Sports, which sublicenses the ACC television rights from ESPN, and terminated a preceding national broadcast deal with Bally Sports on June 15, predues the telecasts. Starting with a September 9 non-conference football game between the Pittsburgh Panthers and Big 12 member Cincinnati Bearcats, The CW airs two ACC football games each Saturday during the Fall (in the afternoon and prime time), and Saturday afternoon men's basketball doubleheaders and Sunday afternoon women's basketball games from December to February.	(Note: Raycom Sports previously distributed ACC football and basketball game packages to local over-the-air television stations throughout the U.S. from 1982 to 2010 (originally through a joint venture with Jefferson-Pilot Communications, which transferred the syndication rights to its standalone ACC football package to the Raycom/Jefferson-Pilot venture in 2004). After ESPN acquired the ACC basketball and football rights in 2010, it reached a sublicensing deal with Raycom Sports that allowed the latter to continue the syndicated package, which was primarily distributed to cable-originated regional sports networks (including Fox Sports Networks, whose Raycom/ACC contract was carried over to Diamond Sports Group after its 2018 purchase of the networks from Disney/Fox and their subsequent rebranding as Bally Sports).)
15	SAG-AFTRA commenced a strike against television and film studios, after the union and the Alliance of Motion Picture and Television Producers failed to agree on a new contract after their previous agreement expired on June 30. This marks the first time that actors have initiated a labor dispute since the 1980 actors strike. With the concurrent Writers Guild of America strike, this was also the first time that actors and writers have walked out simultaneously since 1960. Similar to the WGA, SAG-AFTRA cited several issues, including economic fairness, residuals, regulating the use of artificial intelligence, and alleviating the burdens of the industry-wide shift to self-taping. In addition to impacting film and television productions, actors could not take part in promotional work, such as press junkets, film premieres, and other events such as San Diego Comic-Con. Journalists and performers employed under the SAG-AFTRA National Code of Fair Practice for Network Television Broadcasting contract (a separate agreement negotiated between the union, major broadcast networks and other producers which currently runs through July 2024) were not affected, allowing news programs, most talk, variety, game and reality shows, soap operas, sports and promos to continue production with SAG-AFTRA members covered by that agreement. The strike ended on November 9 after a new agreement with the AMPTP was reached.	
15	The New York Supreme Court rules in favor of DirecTV in a breach of contract lawsuit filed by the company in November 2021 against Nexstar Media Group, involving a 2015 carriage renewal agreement for WDVM/Hagerstown, Maryland (then-NBC affiliate WHAG). The suit alleged that Nexstar did not give DirecTV adequate notice that the station would become an independent once its affiliation contract with NBC expired in July 2016, resulting in the satellite provider overpaying to carry a station that would no longer be a Big Four affiliate. (As part of an effort at the time to reduce affiliate duplication in certain markets, NBC parent Comcast elected to disaffiliate from WHAG, a decision that was disclosed publicly by Nexstar in February 2016, due to perceived competition with nearby O&O WRC/Washington, D.C.) The court ruled that Nexstar overcharged DirecTV by basing its carriage fee rate for WDVM on its prior NBC affiliation, and ordered the broadcaster to repay "several million dollars" worth of excess fees that DirecTV paid during the contract term.	(Note: The NextTV article erroneously identified WHAG as a CW affiliate; WDCW (which Nexstar acquired in 2019 through its purchase of Tribune Media) has exclusively served as the CW affiliate for the Washington, D.C. market since the network's 2006 debut.)
17	Four days after its release, CMT removes the music video for Jason Aldean's single "Try That in a Small Town" from its rotation, amid controversy over the song's lyrics and the video's themes. The scrutiny pertained to the lyrics being interpreted by some listeners as evocative of vigilantism, lynchings and sundown towns (the former interpretation also drawing criticism as Aldean performed at the Route 91 Harvest music festival during the October 2017 Las Vegas mass shooting); the Maury County Courthouse in Columbia, Tennessee, where the video was filmed, being the site of several incidents of racial violence (including a 1927 lynching and the city's 1946 race riots); and the juxtaposition of the lyrics and excerpts of news footage from the 2020 race riots (including lootings and violent clashes between protesters and officers) interspersed in the video. Aldean responded to the criticism on Twitter, asserting the song was meant to represent "the feeling of a community that I had growing up, where we took care of our neighbors, regardless of differences of background or belief."	(Note: The video was later re-edited to remove footage from an Atlanta-area Black Lives Matter protest, excerpted from Fox O&O WAGA (by way of Fox Television Stations-owned streaming news service LiveNOW from Fox), that was not properly cleared before its original release; this version of the "Try That in a Small Town" music video was uploaded to YouTube on July 26.)
18	Diamond Sports Group files separate lawsuits against majority owner Sinclair Broadcast Group and senior creditor JP Morgan that seek to receive compensation for Sinclair's preferred equity repayment to the investment firm. Sinclair completed its $1.025-billion worth of equity repayments to JP Morgan in February for its preferred interest in Diamond that it acquired as part of the group's 2019 purchase of the former Fox Sports Regional Networks from Disney. Diamond accuses Sinclair of manipulating the payment schedule so that JPMorgan was nearly made completely whole on its investment, even though it knew the former's bankruptcy would wipe out its equity in the subsidiary,	
18	After Diamond Sports Group receives bankruptcy court approval of its motion (filed on June 22, with the intent of terminating the contract effective June 30) to surrender its contract with the team, the Arizona Diamondbacks and Major League Baseball assume the regional television rights to the former's games from Bally Sports Arizona, starting with that night's game against the Atlanta Braves. The telecasts will be carried on alternate channels on Cox, Spectrum, Xfinity, DirecTV, DirecTV Stream, Fubo and other providers within the team's regional territory, along with a blackout-free livestream on MLB.tv (with all games scheduled through July 23 available free to stream using MLB login credentials on the respective websites and apps of the MLB and the Diamondbacks). Due to the earlier departures of the NBA's Suns and WNBA's Mercury from the network (see April 28 entry), the loss of the Diamondbacks from the network leaves the NHL's Arizona Coyotes as the only major Phoenix-area sports franchise that maintains a broadcasting relationship with Bally Sports Arizona. Game announcers Steve Berthiaume and Bob Brenly will remain on the broadcasts as they are directly employed by the Diamondbacks.	(Note: The Arizona Diamondbacks had been carrying their regional telecasts on Bally Sports Arizona since the team's inception in 1998 (when the network went by its original identity as Fox Sports Arizona).)
23	Preceding that day's ESPN+ broadcast of a friendly match between AC Milan and Real Madrid CF at the Rose Bowl in Pasadena, California, ESPN soccer analyst Shaka Hislop fainted on-air while co-hosting the pre-match show with play-by-play analyst Dan Thomas. The retired professional soccer star later regained consciousness and was treated by stadium medical personnel, later describing the incident as "awkward" and was seeking medical opinion on the cause of his collapse.	
28	NASCAR announces a seven-year deal with The CW to broadcast Xfinity Series races exclusively on the network starting in 2025. The deal, which replaces NBC, USA Network and Fox Sports as the second-tier circuit's broadcast partners, would see The CW air 33 live races each year as well as weekend practice and qualifying events, with additional content being made available on The CW's streaming apps and digital platforms; NASCAR Productions, the stock car racing league's in-house production unit, provides production responsibilities for the race telecasts and other ancillary content. The deal marks the first time that all Xfinity Series races would be available exclusively on American broadcast television.	(Note: Event rights to the NASCAR Xfinity Series have either been split between broadcast and cable networks on a per-race basis or have been cable-exclusive since the series' 1982 inception as the Budweiser Late Model Sportsman Series.)

== August ==
Date	Event	Source
2	Jeffrey Goldberg is named moderator of Washington Week effective August 11, coinciding with The Atlantic (where Goldberg has served as editor-in-chief since 2016) joining Washington, D.C. PBS member station WETA and NewsHour Productions, LLC as an editorial partner of the PBS political affairs program, which would accordingly be retitled Washington Week with The Atlantic. Goldberg succeeds Yamiche Alcindor, who resigned from the role on February 24, primarily to focus on her job as Washington correspondent for NBC News (various journalists have served as guest moderators since Alcindor's departure).	
4	Days of Our Lives producer Corday Productions announces the departure of the Peacock soap opera's longtime co-executive producer/director Albert Alarr, with senior producer Janet Spellman-Drucker replacing him as co-EP and the company announcing it would be "implementing additional HR protocols." Alarr's departure comes in the aftermath of an investigation conducted by Days distributor Sony Pictures Television (outlined in a July 25 Deadline Hollywood report) that revealed Alarr had allegedly fostered a toxic work environment on the program, and had been verbally and physically abusive toward staffers (namely female staffers, who allege incidents of inappropriate comments and physical contact by Alarr). Though Corday Productions reportedly gave a written warning to Alarr (who denied the allegations against him) and ordered him to undergo training, his continued presence on Days led to on-set tensions among those aware of the investigation, with cast members petitioning for Alarr's ouster.	
9	Big Brother season 25 contestant Luke Valentine is removed from the CBS/Paramount+ reality show one day after uttering racial slurs in a conversation, a violation of the show's code of conduct.	
9	NBC News announces that Laura Jarrett would join Peter Alexander as the new co-anchor of Saturday Today, and the show moved back to Studio 1A at Rockefeller Plaza in New York. Jarrett is succeeding Kristen Welker, who is moving to succeed Chuck Todd as the new moderator of Meet The Press (see June 4 entry). Jarrett's first Saturday Today broadcast alongside Alexander aired on September 9.	
10	The Academy of Television Arts & Sciences and Fox formally announce that the 75th Primetime Emmy Awards would be postponed from its original planned date of September 18 until January 15, 2024. The rescheduling, due to the ongoing Writers Guild and SAG-AFTRA strikes, mark the first postponement of a Primetime Emmy ceremony since 2001, when the September 11 attacks and ensuing start of the war in Afghanistan pushed the 53rd Primetime Emmys from September to November. (The related Creative Arts Emmys also moved from September to the weekend of January 6–7, 2024.)	
15	Sage Steele announces that she has left ESPN after settling her lawsuit against the network and its parent, The Walt Disney Company. Steele, who had been with ESPN since 2007 and had anchored SportsCenter and NBA Countdown, had sued ESPN and Disney in 2022, alleging the network had "sidelined" her after she criticized the network's COVID-19 vaccination policy and questioned the ethnicity of former U.S. President Barack Obama.	
15	Nielsen Media Research reports that for the first time since it started its monthly gauge in 2021, the combined share of broadcast and cable network viewing during July was less than half of all total TV usage (49.6%).	
20	Spain defeats England, 1–0, in the final of the 2023 FIFA Women's World Cup. The tournament, which began on July 20, was televised by Fox Sports and Telemundo respectively in English (on Fox and FS1) and Spanish (on Telemundo and Universo), with all games streamed on the Fox Sports app and Peacock. The networks and streaming platforms carried a primarily late night and early morning schedule of games (with only five matches being held during prime time) due to the tournament being played across nine cities in Australia and New Zealand (12–16 hours ahead of Eastern Daylight Time, depending on each game's corresponding host venue).	
23	Fox News hosts the first of the 2024 Republican Party presidential debates at Fiserv Forum in Milwaukee, Wisconsin, which also hosted the GOP's nominating convention. Eight candidates appear on the stage (Doug Burgum, Chris Christie, Ron DeSantis, Nikki Haley, Asa Hutchinson, Mike Pence, Vivek Ramaswamy, and Tim Scott) the lowest number of candidates for the first Republican debate stage since 2012. The relatively low number was due to strict RNC requirements that any participants have at least 40,000 individual donors and poll above 1% in either three national polls or two national polls and one state poll. (By comparison, high candidate numbers caused both the 2016 GOP and 2020 Democratic debates to be spread out over two nights.) Thanks to not meeting polling requirements or refusing to sign a loyalty pledge to back the eventual nominee, Ryan Binkley, Larry Elder, Will Hurd, Perry Johnson, Francis Suarez, and then-former president Donald Trump did not attend; Trump, the polling frontrunner, instead appears in a pre-taped interview with Tucker Carlson that aired as counterprogramming to the debate on X (formerly Twitter).	
30	Two months after the departure of Chris Licht (see June 7 entry), Warner Bros. Discovery announces the hire of Mark Thompson as CNN's new chief executive officer; Thompson is previously known for his tenures as director general of the BBC and CEO of The New York Times.	
31	The cable networks and television stations owned by The Walt Disney Company (including Disney Channel, Freeform, National Geographic, the FX and ESPN networks, and ABC O&O stations), are removed from Charter Communications' Spectrum cable systems due to an unresolved carriage dispute. The two companies would announce a new agreement on September 11, one that allows customers who subscribe to certain Spectrum packages access to the Disney+ and ESPN+ streaming services (and, when it launches, ESPN's direct-to-consumer service), but also allows Charter to discontinue carriage of Freeform, FXX, FXM, and smaller Disney- and Nat Geo-branded channels, which ended in June 2025.	

== September ==
Date	Event	Source
2	Producers of Love & Hip Hop: Atlanta announce that cast member Erica Mena would not return to the VH1 reality show for its next season, its 12th, after a Season 11 episode (which originally aired on August 29) captured Mena directing a slur at castmate Spice during an argument (and table-flipping incident) between the two women.	
5	Citing a desire to focus on his "health, family, and faith," Chris Mortensen announces on social media he retired from his NFL reporting role at ESPN after the network's coverage of the league's player draft in April. Mortensen had been a mainstay of ESPN's pro football coverage since joining the network in 1991, and appeared in his "insider" role on draft broadcasts, Sunday NFL Countdown, and SportsCenter.	
8	Stations owned and operated by Hearst Television (37 stations covering 27 markets) are removed from Dish Network due to an impasse in retransmission negotiations between the two sides.	
8	Fox News fires senior executive John Finley following an investigation into a violation of the company's conduct standards. Finley's 20-year tenure at Fox included serving as executive producer of Hannity and helping to develop other Fox News signature shows (including Outnumbered and The Five) as well as the Fox Nation streaming service.	
12	The 2023 MTV Video Music Awards airs on MTV and its related digital and linear platforms from Newark's Prudential Center. Nicki Minaj serves as host, with notable winners including Shakira (Michael Jackson Video Vanguard Award), Diddy (Global Icon Award), Minaj herself (Best Hip-Hop Video) and Taylor Swift (a night-leading 9 awards, including her 2nd consecutive Video of the Year, and record-extending 4th overall, for "Anti-Hero").	
14	Morgan Murphy Media announces it would acquire three TV stations in Michigan from The Marks Group: WBKP/Calumet and WBUP/Ishpeming (affiliated with The CW and ABC respectively and simulcasting each network on both stations across the market over subchannels), and WBKB-TV/Alpena (CBS/NBC/ABC/Fox). The $12 million deal, which also includes radio properties in the western Upper Peninsula, is expected to close at the end of the year pending regulatory approval.	
18	Amid the 2023 Hollywood labor disputes, ABC announces that it would simulcast ESPN's Monday Night Football during each week of the 2023 NFL season. This marks the first time a full season of Monday Night Football has aired on ABC since 2005.	
21	WWE announces that its Friday night showcase SmackDown will leave Fox for USA Network in October 2024 as part of a new deal with USA owner NBCUniversal that also includes a series of WWE prime time specials airing on NBC beginning in the 2024–2025 TV season. SmackDown previously aired between 2016 and 2019 on USA, which currently also carries Monday Night Raw and NXT telecasts under separate deals that end in September 2024.	
21	Rupert Murdoch announces he would retire as chairman of Fox Corporation and sister company News Corp in November. Murdoch's son, Lachlan Murdoch, becomes sole chairman of both companies at that time, while the elder Murdoch, who founded the Fox television network in 1986 and Fox News in 1996, retained a "chairman emeritus" role.	
26	Sean McManus announces he would retire from the chairman role at CBS Sports in April 2024, with David Berson replacing him. McManus, who has been with CBS since 1996 and has been its sports division's chairman since 2011, is noted for securing several sports rights deals for the network (most notably the 1998 return of the NFL after a four-year hiatus); he also concurrently served as president of both CBS Sports and CBS News from 2005 to 2011.	
27	The second 2024 Republican Party presidential debate takes place at the Ronald Reagan Presidential Library in Simi Valley, California. The event is conducted by and aired on Fox News and Univision.	
28	The inaugural edition of the People's Choice Country Awards, the country music-focused spin-off of the People's Choice Awards, airs on NBC and Peacock from Nashville's Grand Ole Opry House. Little Big Town serves as hosts of a ceremony that includes notable winners Morgan Wallen (The People's Artist), Jelly Roll (four awards, including Male Artist and New Artist) and Lainey Wilson (three awards, including Female Artist).	

== October ==
Date	Event	Source
5	Roy Wood Jr. announces he would not return to The Daily Show when it returns from the WGA strike on October 16. Wood had been a correspondent on the Comedy Central program since 2015 and had been regarded as a candidate for the permanent host role following Trevor Noah's departure (Wood, in an interview with NPR, indicated he would still consider such a role if the network extended it to him).	
5	The NHL's Arizona Coyotes announce they have agreed to end their relationship with Bally Sports Arizona, and that the team has reached a multi-year deal with Scripps Sports to carry Coyote games on Scripps-owned KNXV-DT2 in Phoenix as well as KGUN-DT2/Tucson and KUPX-TV and KSTU-DT2/Salt Lake City. The Coyotes were the last remaining Arizona pro sports team with a contract with Bally Sports Arizona, after the network gave the Arizona Diamondbacks rights back to Major League Baseball (see July 18 entry) and the NBA's Phoenix Suns and WNBA's Mercury signed new deals with Gray Television (see April 28 entry).	
10	Barry Melrose announces he was resigning from his hockey analyst role at ESPN due to his being diagnosed with Parkinson's disease. A former player and coach (most notably coach of the Los Angeles Kings), Melrose had been a popular part of ESPN's NHL and collegiate hockey coverage since 1994.	
10	The 2023 BET Hip Hop Awards air from the Cobb Energy Performing Arts Centre.	
13	In the wake of the Gaza war that began on October 7, MSNBC temporarily removes Muslim hosts Ayman Mohyeldin, Mehdi Hasan and Ali Velshi from anchoring duties, with their shows temporarily being replaced by ongoing coverage of the war during the weekend. Their shows returned to air the following weekend.	
17	Paramount Global announces that it would shutter Showtime's sports division at the end of the year, with all sports content within the company, and any content that may air on Showtime, expected to be produced by CBS Sports beginning in 2024. Showtime Sports launched in 1986 and has been known for its coverage of boxing (primarily under the Showtime Championship Boxing and ShoBox: The New Generation banners) and mixed martial arts (namely the Bellator MMA promotion) on both the Showtime network and pay-per-view.	

== November ==
Date	Event	Source
1	The Walt Disney Company announces it would acquire the remaining 33% in the streaming service Hulu that it did not already own from NBCUniversal. The $8.61 billion deal is expected to close in 2024.	
1	Stephen Colbert reveals that Taylor Tomlinson would host After Midnight, a new program that would follow his Late Show on CBS' late night schedule beginning in early 2024.	
7	WWE announces that its Tuesday night program NXT would move from USA Network to The CW, as part of a five-year deal that starts in October 2024.	
8	The 57th Annual Country Music Association Awards airs on ABC from Nashville's Bridgestone Arena, with Luke Bryan and Peyton Manning as hosts.	
8	NBC News airs the third 2024 Republican Party presidential debate from Miami.	
9	The National Women's Soccer League announces four-year media deals with incumbent CBS Sports as well as ESPN, Prime Video, and Scripps Sports. The deals, which would bring $60 million in rights fees to the league per year (40 times what the previous deal with CBS had brought in), along with matches on CBS's and ESPN's respective on-air and streaming platforms, Friday night games on Prime Video, and Saturday night doubleheaders on Scripps-owned Ion Television.	
15	Giving no initial reason for doing so, Univision news anchor León Krauze announces his departure from the Spanish-language network. Krauze had co-anchored the network's late-night newscast, Noticiero Univision Edición Nocturna, since January 2022, and had spent the prior 10 years as news anchor for Univision's Los Angeles O&O, KMEX-DT.	
23	The 97th Macy's Thanksgiving Day Parade broadcast attracts a record TV audience for NBC, with 28.5 million total viewers watching the event on NBC or Peacock (22.3 million for the live morning broadcast alone).	
26	The live broadcast of the NFL RedZone channel is interrupted by a fire alarm inside the NFL Network studio in Inglewood, California; the alarm, which turns out to be a false one, forces host Scott Hanson and the channel's production crew to temporarily evacuate the studio (viewers would see coverage of the Buffalo Bills/Philadelphia Eagles game in the interim).	
29	NASCAR announces seven-year deals for its top-tier Cup Series, beginning in 2025, with Fox Sports, NBC Sports, Prime Video, and TNT Sports. The deals would see incumbents Fox and NBC carry an equal number of 14 races each season, but also see new partners Prime Video and TNT not only split a mid-season package of 10 races but also exclusively carry practice and qualifying sessions for every Cup Series race.	
30	Bailey Cable TV, a TV/internet provider serving small towns in southwestern Mississippi and eastern Louisiana, closes operations and disconnects service to customers without advance warning.	
30	After the two sides fail to reach a retransmission agreement before a 5PM (Pacific Time) deadline, 66 stations (in 52 markets) owned by Tegna Inc. are removed from the DirecTV satellite service. The signals would be restored on January 13, 2024, after Tegna and DirecTV reach a new agreement.	
30	In what the network bills as "The Great Red vs. Blue State Debate," Sean Hannity moderates a debate on Fox News between two state governors with confirmed or rumored presidential aspirations, Florida Republican Ron DeSantis (who was seeking the GOP nomination for president in 2024) and California Democrat Gavin Newsom (who had been regarded as possibly contending for his party's nomination in 2028).	

== December ==
Date	Event	Source
1	Six months after the company terminated a proposed sale of the stations to Forum Communications (see June 6 entry), Red River Broadcasting enters into an agreement to sell Fox affiliates KVRR/Fargo–Moorhead and KQDS/Duluth–Superior to Coastal Television Broadcasting Company; the stations are Red River's last remaining TV properties, and the transaction, which is subject to FCC approval, is later priced at $18.1 million.	
6	The five major commercial broadcast networks (ABC, CBS, The CW, Fox, and NBC) begin their prime-time schedules by simulcasting an "in memoriam" tribute card to the recently deceased television producer Norman Lear, who died the previous day.	
6	The fourth 2024 Republican Party presidential debate is held in Tuscaloosa, Alabama, airing on NewsNation and simulcast on The CW. It is the first national news program for the latter network since its 2022 purchase by Nexstar Media Group, and it becomes the last of the five major English-language commercial broadcast networks in the United States to offer news programming.	
7	Amazon Prime Video announces it has reached an agreement to carry Premier Boxing Champions events beginning in 2024, both pay-per-view events available to purchase on streaming, cable, and satellite, as well as additional bouts and ancillary programming available to Prime Video subscribers only. The deal, which is projected to feature 12-14 events in its first year, replaces PBC's relationship with Showtime in the wake of that cable network's exit from sports productions (see October 17 entry).	
15	Mayim Bialik announced that she was fired from Jeopardy!, Bialik had shared hosting duties on the syndicated game show with Ken Jennings, who has been the show's sole host since May (after Bialik departed in support of the show's striking writers) and would go forward in that same capacity.	
15	The 50th Daytime Emmy Awards, the first major showbiz award event since the resolution of the 2023 Hollywood labor disputes (it had been rescheduled from June 16 due to the WGA strike), air on CBS from Los Angeles' Westin Bonaventure Hotel. Kevin Frazier and Nischelle Turner host the ceremony that sees such notable winners as General Hospital (Outstanding Drama Series), The Kelly Clarkson Show (Outstanding Talk Series), and Susan Lucci and Maury Povich (Lifetime Achievement Awards).	
16	Rudolph the Red-Nosed Reindeer, Frosty the Snowman, and Frosty Returns all aired on CBS for the final time on December 16, 2023. Frosty Returns is not available on any streaming service since 2023, but is exclusively available only on DVD, Blu-ray, and on video on-demand services. Frosty the Snowman and Rudolph the Red-Nosed Reindeer both moved to NBC on December 5, 2024, and December 6, 2024, respectively.	
19	A helicopter operated by ABC O&O WPVI-TV/Philadelphia crashes in a wooded area in Washington Township, Burlington County, New Jersey, killing pilot Monroe Smith and camera operator Christopher Dougherty.	
26	Stating the need remains to continue ensuring competition and diversity of viewpoint, the FCC announces in its quadrennial ownership review that it would uphold restrictions that forbid common ownership of two of the four major TV networks, and strengthen rules that forbid one entity from owning every TV station in a single market (with case-specific requests for ownership of more than one of a market's top-four stations still considered). Broadcasters had lobbied for the loosening of station ownership rules, citing loss of audience share to streaming services.	
28	Altice USA announces it has sold Cheddar, the millennial-targeting business news channel, to the media company Archetype; the financial terms are undisclosed.	
29	Paramount-owned over-the-air network Dabl receives a major rebrand. The network also transitions into broadcasting Black sitcoms, after four years of airing lifestyle-oriented programs.	
