= Democratic Party presidential debates =

United States presidential debates

Since 1983, the Democratic Party of the United States holds a few debates between candidates for the Democratic nomination in presidential elections during the primary election season. Unlike debates between party-nominated candidates, which have been organized by the bi-partisan Commission on Presidential Debates since 1988, debates between candidates for party nomination are organized by mass media outlets.

Party presidential debates are typically not held when an incumbent president is running for a second term.

== List of debates ==
=== 1956 ===
On May 21, 1956, in Miami, Florida, Former Illinois Governor Adlai E. Stevenson and Senator Estes Kefauver of Tennessee debated on the ABC Television network. It was moderated by Quincy Howe.

=== 1960 ===
On May 5 of that year, just prior to the 1960 West Virginia primary, Senators John F. Kennedy (D-Massachusetts) and Hubert Humphrey (D-Minnesota) debated in Charleston. Kennedy won the primary and Humphrey dropped out.

Later, at the National Convention, Senate Majority Leader Lyndon B. Johnson of Texas challenged Kennedy to a televised debate before a joint meeting of the Texas and Massachusetts delegations; Kennedy accepted. Most observers felt that Kennedy had won and Johnson was not able to expand his delegate support beyond the South.

=== 1968 ===
Senators Robert F. Kennedy and Eugene McCarthy engaged in a television debate on ABC's Issues and Answers a few days before the California primary; it was generally considered a draw. This would be the last time there would be this few debates in years without an incumbent.

=== 1972 ===
The first "regular" presidential debate took place in Durham New Hampshire two days before the March 7th primary. The five candidates on the ballot, Democratic front-runner Sen. Edmund Muskie of Maine faced long-shots Senators George McGovern of South Dakota and Vance Hartke of Indiana; Los Angeles Mayor Sam Yorty; and Edward T. Coll, a 32-year-old social worker, who waved a rubber rat to symbolize the problem of urban decay.

Muskie's lackluster performance helped doom his campaign and boost McGovern to top tier status.

There were no further debates until May, shortly before the California primary, when McGovern twice debated former Vice President Hubert Humphrey one-on-one. There was also a multicandidate debate with five candidates participating -- Shirley Chisholm, Humphrey, McGovern, Yorty, and Taylor Hardin (Alabama's director of finance, substituting for a wounded George Wallace).

=== 1976 ===
The campaign was unusual as there were no front-runners, or in fact any well-known candidates at all. The first debate took place in Boston on February 23, with Birch Bayh, Jimmy Carter, Fred Harris, Henry M. Jackson, Milton Shapp, Sargent Shriver, and Mo Udall participating.

A second, a month later, had Carter, Frank Church, Harris, Jackson and Udall on the panel. And in May, with now-front runner Jimmy Carter boycotting, Church and Udall participated in a third.

=== 1980 ===
Despite repeated calls by Massachusetts Senator Edward M. Kennedy, President Jimmy Carter refused to debate.

=== 1984 ===
With President Reagan's poll ratings down in the spring of 1983, a full dozen major candidates announced for the Democratic nomination.

A series of debates began on January 15 in New Hampshire, with Reubin Askew, Alan Cranston, John Glenn, Gary Hart, Fritz Hollings, Jesse Jackson, George McGovern and Walter F. Mondale on the panel. Later, the field was winnowed down to just Mondale, Hart and Jackson.

Hart was badly hurt during a televised debate when former Vice President Walter Mondale used a popular television commercial slogan to ridicule Hart's vague "New Ideas" platform. Turning to Hart on camera, Mondale said that whenever he heard Hart talk about his "New Ideas", he was reminded of the Wendy's fast-food slogan "Where's the beef?". The remark drew loud laughter and applause from the audience and caught Hart off-guard. Hart never fully recovered from Mondale's charge that his "New Ideas" were shallow and lacking in specifics. Earlier in the same Democratic primary debate, Hart committed a serious faux pas that largely went underreported. Asked what he would do if an unidentified airplane flew over the Iron Curtain from a Warsaw Pact nation, Hart replied that he would send up a United States Air Force plane and instruct them to determine whether or not it was an enemy plane by looking in the cockpit window to see if the pilots were wearing uniforms. Fellow candidate John Glenn, a former Marine Corps fighter pilot, replied that this was physically impossible.

At a roundtable debate between the three remaining Democratic candidates moderated by Phil Donahue, Mondale and Hart got in such a heated argument over the issue of U.S. policy in Central America that Jesse Jackson had to tap his water glass on the table to get them to simmer down.

=== 1987–1988 ===
In the most chaotic primary to date, the series for the first time began in the year before the election. The first debate took place on July 1, 1987, over a full year before the convention. This had Bruce Babbitt, Joe Biden, Mike Dukakis, Dick Gephardt, Al Gore, Jesse Jackson and Paul Simon on stage.

Before the year had ended, Biden was out, and former front-runner Gary Hart was back in the race. All in all there would be twelve debates.

=== 1991–1992 ===
Wishing to keep things manageable, it was decided to hold the first debate (of 14) in December 1991. It took place on the 15th with Jerry Brown, Bill Clinton, Tom Harkin, Bob Kerrey, Paul Tsongas and Douglas Wilder on the platform. Wilder would soon drop out.

The debate was marked by protests against moderator Tom Brokaw of NBC by candidates he had excluded. Perennial candidates Eugene McCarthy and Lenora Fulani; as well as minor candidates such as former Irvine, California mayor Larry Agran, Billy Jack actor Tom Laughlin, and others) unsuccessfully took legal action in an attempt to be included.

The fifth debate of the 1992 season was held on February 23, 1992, in Sioux Falls, South Dakota. Moderated by CNN correspondent Ken Bode and co-hosted by South Dakota Public Broadcasting, candidates Brown, Clinton, Tsongas, Agran, Harkin and Kerrey debated the economy, agriculture, healthcare, the environment and Native American issues.

Kerrey would win the South Dakota primary, only to be wiped out by Clinton on Super Tuesday.

Later on, during the final debate in Buffalo, New York on March 21, perennial candidate Eugene McCarthy would be allowed to participate along with Clinton, Agran and Brown.

=== 1999–2000 ===
The last of nine Democratic presidential debates was held on March 1, 2000, between Vice President Al Gore and New Jersey Senator Bill Bradley at the Harry Chandler Auditorium in Los Angeles. It was moderated by CNN anchorman Bernard Shaw, co-sponsored by CNN and the Los Angeles Times, and paneled by Jeff Greenfield and Ron Brownstein. The candidates largely agreed with each other on gun control, abortion, gay rights, and policy towards China, but differed in regards to Gore's record in the Senate on abortion and other issues.

=== 2003–2004 ===
With President George W. Bush unpopular due to the war in Iraq, "debate season" began earlier than ever before.

On May 3, 2003, Democrats met at the University of South Carolina, located in Columbia, South Carolina, in the first formal debate between the nine challengers for the 2004 Democratic party presidential nomination. Candidates Howard Dean, John Edwards, Dick Gephardt, Bob Graham, John Kerry, Dennis Kucinich, Joe Lieberman, Carol Moseley Braun and Al Sharpton disagreed on the war against Iraq, health insurance, and even President Bush's tax cuts, but unite in criticizing Bush's handling of the economy.

Later, Wesley Clark would join the group for a total of ten debates before the end of the year.

There would be six debates between New Year's Day and Super Tuesday. With Gephardt and Dean bludgeoning each other out of contention and allowing Kerry to sweep the primaries.

=== 2007–2008 ===
Debate season started earlier than ever before, on April 26, 2007, in Orangeburg, South Carolina. Eight Democrats (Joe Biden, Hillary Clinton, Chris Dodd, John Edwards, Mike Gravel, Dennis Kucinich, Barack Obama and Bill Richardson) were invited to participate. Twelve debates took place in 2007, and by the end of the year Dennis Kucinich withdrew, and Mike Gravel defected to the Libertarian Party.

Christopher Dodd and Joe Biden dropped out of the race following the Iowa caucuses, which was also the earliest ever held. Bill Richardson dropped out after the New Hampshire primary and Edwards after South Carolina's.

There were seven debates during 2008, four of which were between the two survivors, Hillary Clinton and Barack Obama.

=== 2015–2016 ===
The Democratic National Committee (DNC) announced on May 5, 2015, that there would be 6 debates, which they considered "a reasonable number and in line with what the national committee sanctioned in 2008." On August 6, 2015, the DNC announced the locations for all six original debates, with exact venues still to be determined, and the specific dates for the first four debates.

In late January 2016, trailing the New Hampshire primary race, the Clinton campaign requested a second New Hampshire debate, which had already been scheduled to February 4, to be officially sanctioned by the DNC. The Sanders campaign said they would only agree with that proposal if a total of four additional debates would be held, one in February, March, April and May each. Both campaigns agreed to a March 3 debate in Flint, Michigan. There also seemed to be agreement on a California debate on May 24, but not at the remaining April 14 debate in Brooklyn, New York, as proposed by Sanders. On February 3, just ahead of the second New Hampshire debate, Clinton's and Sanders's campaigns agreed in principle to holding four more debates, also sanctioned by the DNC, for a total of 10.

=== 2019–2020 ===
The Democratic National Committee sanctioned eleven presidential debates between June 2019 and March 2020, six in 2019 and the remaining five in 2020. Candidates were prohibited from participating in unsanctioned debates (at the cost of being excluded from the next sanctioned debate), and no unsanctioned debates took place during the campaign. Twenty-three candidates participated in at least one debate; due to the large number of candidates, each of the first two debates was held over two consecutive nights, with ten candidates participating each night.

Candidates were required to qualify for each debate by meeting one or more specified requirements imposed by the DNC, pertaining to minimum poll results in national polls or polls of early primary or caucus states; minimum numbers of donors; or, for the later debates, having received minimum numbers of pledged delegates.

Joe Biden and Bernie Sanders were the only candidates to participate in all eleven debates; Pete Buttigieg, Amy Klobuchar, and Elizabeth Warren all participated in the first ten debates and suspended their campaigns before the eleventh debate.

== See also ==
- Republican Party presidential debates
- United States presidential debates
