= Prime years =

Ideal or perfect age

Prime years, or the ideal age or perfect age, are a part of someone's self-concept and occur in many philosophical and sociological deliberations. They refer to the stage of life where one experiences the best years of their life, and is in a good mental and physical state and is overall healthy. The phase of young adulthood is often considered the prime age.

== In Islam ==
The notion also comes up in the contrast between career and leisure activity whereby it may be suggested that gratification ought to occur after one has made oneself financially stable, and the subsequent contrasting views on the age range that ought to occur in. In religions, such idealizations similarly exist with for instance quite detailed accounts on what the general age range of entrants of jannah (heaven) will be. According to various hadiths, that age is 33 for men and 17 for women, with the presupposition that these ages augment the best of human attributes and that these ages do not change but remain constant since the biological process of ageing becomes obsolete. Evaluations of a more critical nature tend to focus upon the fairness of prolonged periods of education for young people whereby in some subjects they only reap the rewards of their labour when they are middle aged, and thereby spend their prior younger years through various sacrificing stages. In reflections on adventurous sex, there are at times indications of a specific age targeted due to a perception that this particular age range has the most feasible pragmatism as an audience whether for physiological or practical purposes.

== See also ==
- Ageing
- Aging and society
