= Republican Party presidential debates =

Since 1980, the Republican Party of the United States has held debates between candidates for the Republican nomination in presidential elections during the primary election season. Unlike debates between party-nominated candidates, which have been organized by the bi-partisan Commission on Presidential Debates since 1988, debates between candidates for party nomination are organized by mass media outlets.

Party presidential debates are typically not held when an incumbent president is running for a second term. Although debates were held in advance of the 2020 Republican Party presidential primaries among challengers to incumbent president Donald Trump, the Republican National Committee did not participate in scheduling those debates nor did Trump attend any of those debates.

== List of debates ==
=== 1948 ===
The Dewey–Stassen debate was the first audio-recorded presidential debate to ever take place in the United States. It featured New York Governor Thomas E. Dewey and former Minnesota Governor Harold Stassen discussing the legal status of Communist Party of the United States four days before the 1948 Oregon Republican presidential primary. The debate transmitted throughout the nation via radio broadcast, and is credited with helping Dewey win the primary and the nomination of his party. It is often cited as establishing the modern presidential debate standard.

This would prove to be the last time the Republicans held such an event for several decades.

=== 1980 ===
In what would be the start of a tradition in open primary campaigns, the first (of six) Republican presidential debate in over 30 years was held in Iowa on January 6, 1980. Former California Governor Ronald Reagan, who was the prohibitive front-runner, chose to bypass the debate. Five of the ten candidates participated: George H. W. Bush, John Anderson, Phil Crane, Bob Dole, and John Connally. The participants openly criticized Reagan for taking the state caucus for granted, which set the stage for a victory by Ambassador Bush. Reagan would participate in all further debates, including the decisive one, the February 23 debate with George Bush which became known as the "Ambush at Nashua".

With Reagan boycotting the Puerto Rico primary in deference to New Hampshire, Bush won the territory easily, giving him an early lead going into New Hampshire.

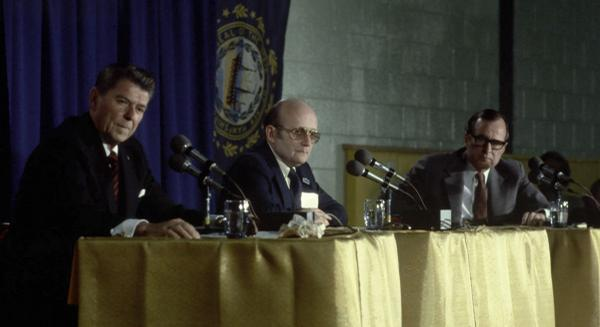
The Nashua debate between Ronald Reagan (left) and George H. W. Bush (right)

With the other candidates in single digits, the Nashua Telegraph offered to host a debate between Reagan and Bush. Worried that a newspaper-sponsored debate might violate electoral regulations, Reagan subsequently arranged to fund the event with his own campaign money, inviting candidates John Anderson, Howard Baker, Phil Crane and Bob Dole to participate at short notice. The Bush camp did not learn of Reagan's decision to include the other candidates until the debate was due to commence. Bush refused to participate, which led to an impasse on the stage. As Reagan attempted to explain his decision, the editor of the Nashua Telegraph ordered the sound man to mute Reagan's microphone. A visibly angry Reagan responded, "I am paying for this microphone, Mr. Green!" [sic] (referring to the editor Jon Breen). Eventually the other candidates agreed to leave, and the debate proceeded between Reagan and Bush. Reagan's quote was often repeated as "I paid for this microphone!" and dominated news coverage of the event; Reagan sailed to an easy win in New Hampshire.

Reagan won New Hampshire in a landslide.

The final debate took place on April 24, at Houston Civic Center in Texas, and was between Reagan and Bush. The Moderator was Howard K. Smith and it was sponsored by the League of Women Voters.

=== 1987–1988 ===
On October 28, 1987 Vice President George H. W. Bush fought off attacks from his Republican rivals Pete du Pont, Al Haig, Bob Dole, Jack Kemp and Pat Robertson in the opening debate of the GOP presidential campaign. It was moderated by William F. Buckley Jr. was joined by former Democratic National Committee chairman Robert S. Strauss.

The six would debate five more times before Haig dropped out, and then three more, with varying numbers of candidates until Bush rapped up the nomination in March.

=== 1995–1996 ===
The debates started on Wednesday, October 11, 1995 in Manchester, NH, with 10 candidates: Governor Lamar Alexander, Senators Phil Gramm, Bob Dole, Richard Lugar and Arlen Specter; Congressman Bob Dornan; as well as hobbyists Pat Buchanan, Steve Forbes, Alan Keyes and Morry Taylor in attendance.

There were two in January, three in February, and two in March.

=== 1999–2000 ===
The first televised debate took place on October 22, 1999 in Durham, NH. Congressman Gary Bauer, Senators Orrin Hatch and John McCain; as well as Steve Forbes and Alan Keyes participated.

Governor George W. Bush wouldn't join the group until the third debate, which took place in Manchester, NH on December 2. There were three in December and six in January, by which time, the only viable candidates were Bush and McCain. The final debate took place in Los Angeles, CA on March 2, with Bush, Keyes and McCain on stage.

=== 2007–2008 ===
21 debates were held between the candidates for the Republican nomination for the 2008 United States presidential election. The first debate was held on May 3, 2007 and the final debate was on February 2, 2008. Twelve candidates participated in at least one debate, with the most participants in any one debate being ten. Four candidates participated in at least sixteen debates: Mike Huckabee, John McCain, Ron Paul, and Mitt Romney.

=== 2011–2012 ===
There were 20 debates held between the candidates for the Republican nomination for the 2012 United States presidential election. The first debate was held on May 5, 2011 and the final debate was on February 22, 2012. Ten candidates participated in at least one debate. The most participants in any one debate was nine, in the September 22, 2011 debate in Orlando, Florida. Four candidates participated in the last four debates: Newt Gingrich, Ron Paul, Mitt Romney, and Rick Santorum. Paul and Santorum were the only candidates to participate in all 20 debates.

=== 2015–2016 ===
There were 12 debates held between the candidates for the Republican nomination for the 2016 United States presidential election. The first debate was held on August 6, 2015 and the final debate was on March 10, 2016. Due to the large pool of candidates, some debates were split into a primary debate and a secondary debate. Seventeen candidates participated in at least one debate. Four candidates were invited to every debate: Ted Cruz, John Kasich, Marco Rubio, and Donald Trump. Of these, three candidates participated in every debate (Trump declined to participate in the January 28, 2016 debate in Des Moines, Iowa).

=== 2019–2020 ===
Because Donald Trump was running for re-election, the Republican National Committee did not schedule any debates for the 2020 Republican Party presidential primaries. However, private organizations held three debates among Trump's challengers, none of which Trump attended. Joe Walsh and Bill Weld participated in all three debates, and Mark Sanford participated in two debates before suspending his campaign. Walsh and Weld eventually suspended their campaigns as well.

=== 2023–2024 ===
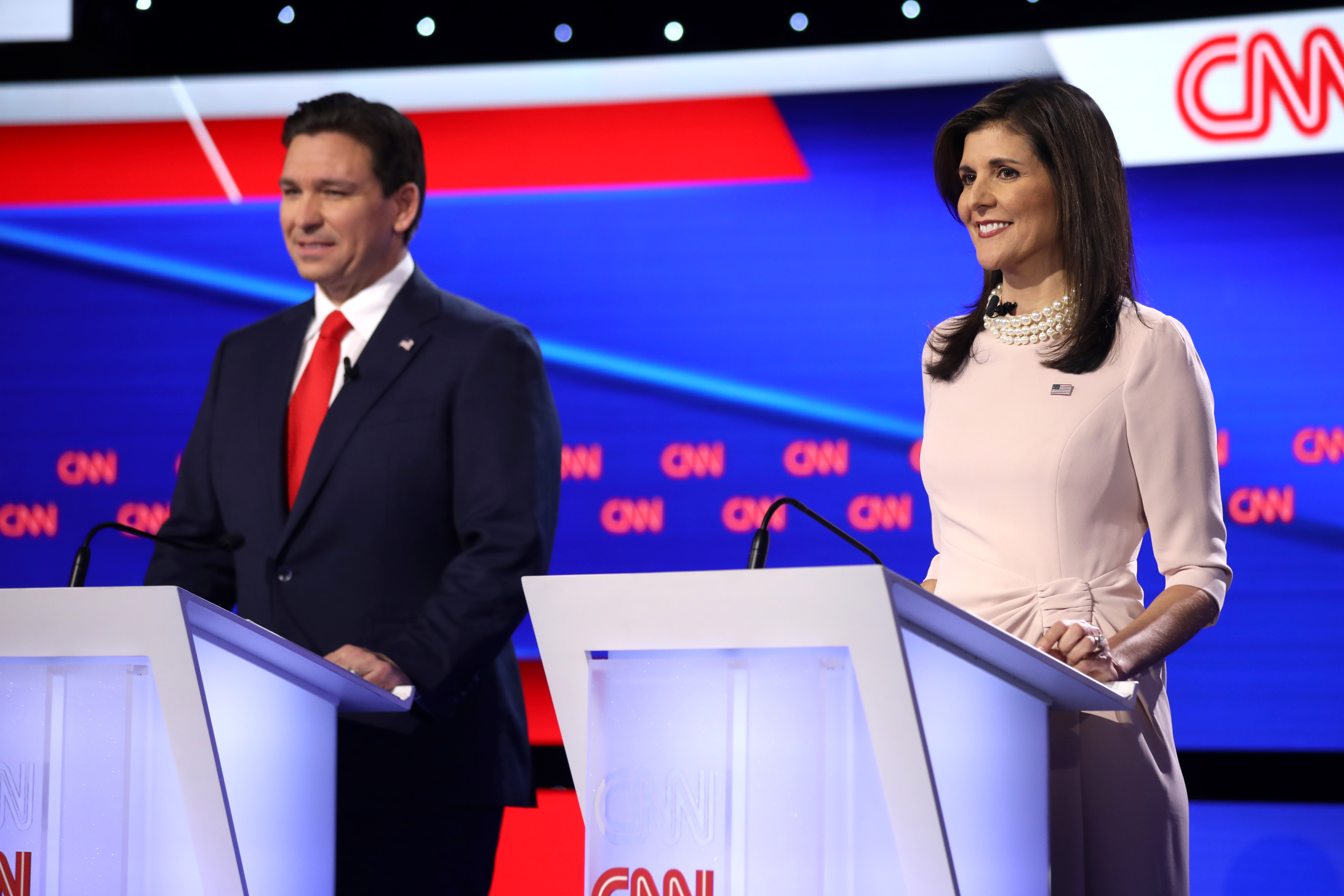
Ron DeSantis and Nikki Haley at the CNN Republican Presidential Debate in Des Moines, Iowa.

Florida Governor Ron DeSantis and former Ambassador to the United Nations Nikki Haley were the only two candidates to attend every debate. Trump eventually secured the nomination, despite not participating in any of them.

== See also ==
- Democratic Party presidential debates
- United States presidential debates
