= Pete Dominick =

American comedian and talk radio personality

- Born: October 31, 1975 (age 50); Syracuse, New York
- Notable work: Host of Stand Up! on Sirius XM Radio; Guest on FOX's Red Eye

Comedy career
- Years active: 2006–present
- Medium: Stand-up, television, radio
- Genres: Situational comedy, progressive, liberal
- Website: http://standupwithpetedominick.com

Peter J. Dominick (born October 31, 1975) is an American political comedian and talk radio personality.

== Stand-up career ==
=== Early life ===
Dominick was born in Syracuse, New York, and started performing in public during high school, where he would emcee talent shows and read morning announcements over the public-address system. His career took off in the late 1990s when he performed in various clubs around Manhattan, first as an amateur and later as a professional.

=== Headlining ===
Dominick's comedy career expanded around the turn of the century when he began performing at colleges all over the country. He has performed at hundreds of campuses and started headlining clubs and theaters in 2005.

=== Audience warm-up ===
One of Dominick's highest profile mediums as a stand-up comic was as the warm-up act for The Colbert Report with Stephen Colbert on Comedy Central. He has also filled in as the warm-up act for The Daily Show with Jon Stewart on over 100 episodes. In 2013, he left The Colbert Report in order to focus on his Sirius XM show and spend more time with his family.

Dominick has warmed up audiences for CNBC's Mad Money and is frequently the opening act for comedian Artie Lange.

== Radio career ==
=== Comedy By Request ===
In 2006, Dominick was approached by Sirius Satellite Radio and signed up to host the Comedy by Request program on their uncensored comedy channel Raw Dog (Sirius 104, XM 150) after his performance on the New Faces Of Comedy show at the Montréal Just for Laughs festival, "one of the highest honors a young comedian can achieve." He remained with Comedy by Request on Raw Dog until November 2008, when he left to concentrate his efforts on his program at P.O.T.U.S., Stand Up! With Pete Dominick.

=== Getting Late with Pete Dominick ===
About a month after being on air with Comedy by Request in 2006, Dominick was approached by Sirius to host an additional show, Getting Late with Pete Dominick, also on Raw Dog, which featured pre-taped interviews with notable celebrities and comedians such as Dave Attell, Robert Schimmel, Steven Wright and Louis CK.

=== Stand Up! with Pete Dominick ===
On February 21, 2008, Dominick began hosting the political talk show Pete's Big Mouth on the now-defunct Sirius channel Indie Talk, which had launched two weeks earlier, along with Sean Bertollo (executive producer), Aaron Hodges (co-producer), and Alexandra Di Trolio (co-producer). The show continued until November 12, 2008, at which point it was renamed Stand Up! with Pete Dominick during the new channel lineup that resulted from the merger of Sirius and XM, which also saw Indie Talk on Sirius and P.O.T.U.S. '08 on XM being combined to form P.O.T.U.S. on Sirius 110 and XM 130.

The three-hour program was broadcast live weekdays from 3:00 to 6:00 PM Eastern and explored political and current events relevant to the United States, consistent with the motto of the P.O.T.U.S. channel: "Politics of the United States, for the people of the United States."

In February 2013, Dominick and Stand Up! with Pete Dominick left P.O.T.U.S. and moved to Indie, in the morning time slot of 6:00 to 9:00 AM Eastern, with a repeat immediately following at 9:00 AM. On this new channel and slot, the show has continued to spend a lot of time on politics but has also had more freedom to branch out into other topics, including religion, race, energy, education policy, veterans' issues, and parenting, among others.

Guests that have been interviewed on Stand Up! with Pete Dominick include Michael Scheuer, former CIA analyst; Tim Wise, prominent anti-racist activist and writer; David Kilcullen, former senior counterinsurgency advisor to General David Petraeus; Evan Wolfson, civil rights attorney and advocate; Ann Coulter, social and political commentator, columnist, and author; Jesse Ventura, former governor of Minnesota; Kashif Hasnie, RAND fellow and expert on issues pertaining to Afghanistan and Pakistan, and many others.

On October 11, 2019, following two days of an unexpected absence from live broadcasting, Dominick announced through a recorded message at the start of his normal time slot that SiriusXM failed to renew his contract with the satellite radio platform, and Dominick had decided to "end the show early". It was unclear how long the show could have continued had it lasted through the final days of what was contractually suggested.

=== Rick Sánchez firing ===
On September 30, 2010, Rick Sánchez was interviewed on Sirius XM's radio show Stand Up With Pete Dominick. Sánchez's interview occurred on the final day of his show in the 8 p.m. time slot and he was reportedly angry about being replaced by CNN's new Parker Spitzer talk show. The day following his remarks, CNN announced that Sanchez was no longer employed with the company.

== CNN ==
In March 2010, Dominick began appearing as a correspondent on CNN's John King, USA, in a man on the street segment called "Pete on the Street". Dominick's weekend show What the Week premiered on CNN in October 2010.

== Personal views ==
Dominick is routinely open about his political and philosophical views on the program Stand Up! With Pete Dominick, freely admitting that he brings personal bias to the show, and a strong opinion on certain issues (e.g., gay marriage). During his CNN broadcasts in particular, he routinely has left-leaning bias, but his SiriusXM show Stand Up! With Pete Dominick usually consists of an open debate.

He describes himself as an agnostic atheist whenever relevant subjects arise, a view point he described arriving at "around 1996 or 1997", leaving behind the Catholic beliefs he had grown up with. More recently, Dominick has stated that while he doesn't necessarily believe in a God, he has a strong spiritual side and believes in the interconnectedness of life. He practices transcendental meditation.

He can also be heard admitting regularly to being fallible—that he can be wrong and has been wrong—and encouraging listeners to challenge him "through conversation on important issues." He can also be heard telling his listening audience on practically every episode to "think for yourself", to "check your sources", and to "always question what you hear" and so forth, a message he typically closes every episode with.

He consistently tries to avoid political labels, insisting that callers speak to the issues without pigeon-holing themselves with labels that do not contribute anything meaningful other than partisan divisions.

== Personal life ==
Dominick lives in Rockland County, New York, with his wife and two daughters.

Dominick attended and graduated from SUNY Cobleskill, where he spent his time playing lacrosse, announcing basketball games, and working as a resident assistant.
