= Campbell Brown (TV program) =

Former CNN Program

- Also known as: Campbell Brown: Election Center (Mar – Oct 2008); Campbell Brown: No Bias, No Bull (Oct 2008 – Jun 2009)
- Presented by: Campbell Brown
- Country of origin: United States

Production
- Running time: 60 minutes

Original release
- Network: CNN
- Release: March 2008 – July 21, 2010

Campbell Brown is an American primetime newscast television program anchored by Campbell Brown that aired on CNN. The program focused on United States politics. It was originally known as Campbell Brown: Election Center, then as Campbell Brown: No Bias, No Bull, before finally settling on just Campbell Brown as the title. The program aired from March 2008 to July 2010.

== History ==
=== Campbell Brown: Election Center ===
Brown began hosting a program first called Campbell Brown: Election Center in March 2008, in the timeslot previously held by Paula Zahn Now. Starting after the beginning of the 2008 presidential election primary season, the program focused on the 2008 campaign until Election Day.

=== Campbell Brown: No Bias, No Bull ===
The program adopted the name Campbell Brown: No Bias, No Bull shortly before Election Day 2008. This name is based on the slogan the program adopted soon after Brown became the anchor, to differentiate Brown's program from other editorial-style cable news programs (such as The O'Reilly Factor and Countdown with Keith Olbermann) with whom she was competing. The show began with Brown detailing her top story of the night and expressing a "no bull" review, her opinion, and other analysts' opinions as well. A segment at the end of the broadcast called "Dear Mr. President" featured young kids who wrote letters to Barack Obama, and would like him to read them.

=== Campbell Brown ===
Upon Campbell Brown's return from maternity leave on June 1, 2009, the program was renamed to simply Campbell Brown. Along with a revamped opening, the show adopted a 4-person panel set-up, something initially launched in May 2009 when Roland Martin filled in for Brown while she delivered her second child.

On May 18, 2010, Brown announced that she would be leaving CNN, after the network agreed to release her from her contract. She stated that poor ratings had been the primary reason for her departure.

"I'm pretty sure the last time any anchor could honestly ignore ratings was well before I was born. Of course I pay attention to ratings. And simply put, the ratings for my program are not where I would like them to be. It is largely for this reason that I am stepping down as anchor of CNN's Campbell Brown."

In June 2010, CNN announced that a new program entitled Parker Spitzer, hosted by former New York governor Eliot Spitzer and conservative columnist Kathleen Parker, would be replacing Campbell Brown later in the year. For several months, the 8:00–9:00 pm time slot was filled by Rick's List, hosted by Rick Sanchez.

== Ratings ==
CNN's Campbell Brown has attracted audiences which put it well behind its competitors in the 8 pm time slot, including Fox News's O'Reilly Factor, MSNBC's Countdown with Keith Olbermann, and HLN's Nancy Grace. It had an average audience of 591,000 in the first quarter of 2010.
