= Rick's List =

- Presented by: Rick Sanchez
- Country of origin: United States
- Original language: English

Production
- Production locations: CNN Center, Atlanta, GA
- Running time: 120 minutes

Original release
- Network: CNN
- Release: January 18 – October 1, 2010

Rick's List is a news and commentary program on CNN hosted by Rick Sanchez. The show aired weekdays from 3 to 5 PM EST. It first aired on Monday, January 18, 2010, when Sanchez's one-hour CNN Newsroom shift was lengthened to two hours and given its own title, and The Situation Room with Wolf Blitzer was moved one hour later. Its last broadcast was on Friday, October 1, 2010, when CNN fired Sanchez over controversial comments made on a radio show.

As with Sanchez's previous broadcast, Rick's List focuses on using social networking including Twitter to create a "national conversation" about the news. One continuing segment was called "The List U Don't Want 2 Be On," in which he criticizes others' actions and comments.

== Primetime ==
Starting on Thursday, July 22, 2010, an hour-long primetime edition of Rick's List, entitled Primetime, was added as an interim replacement for Campbell Brown until the premiere of its replacement, Parker Spitzer.

Preceded by CNN Newsroom	CNN Weekday Lineup; 3:00PM–5:00PM	Succeeded by The Situation Room
