= Paula Zahn =

American journalist and newscaster (born 1956)

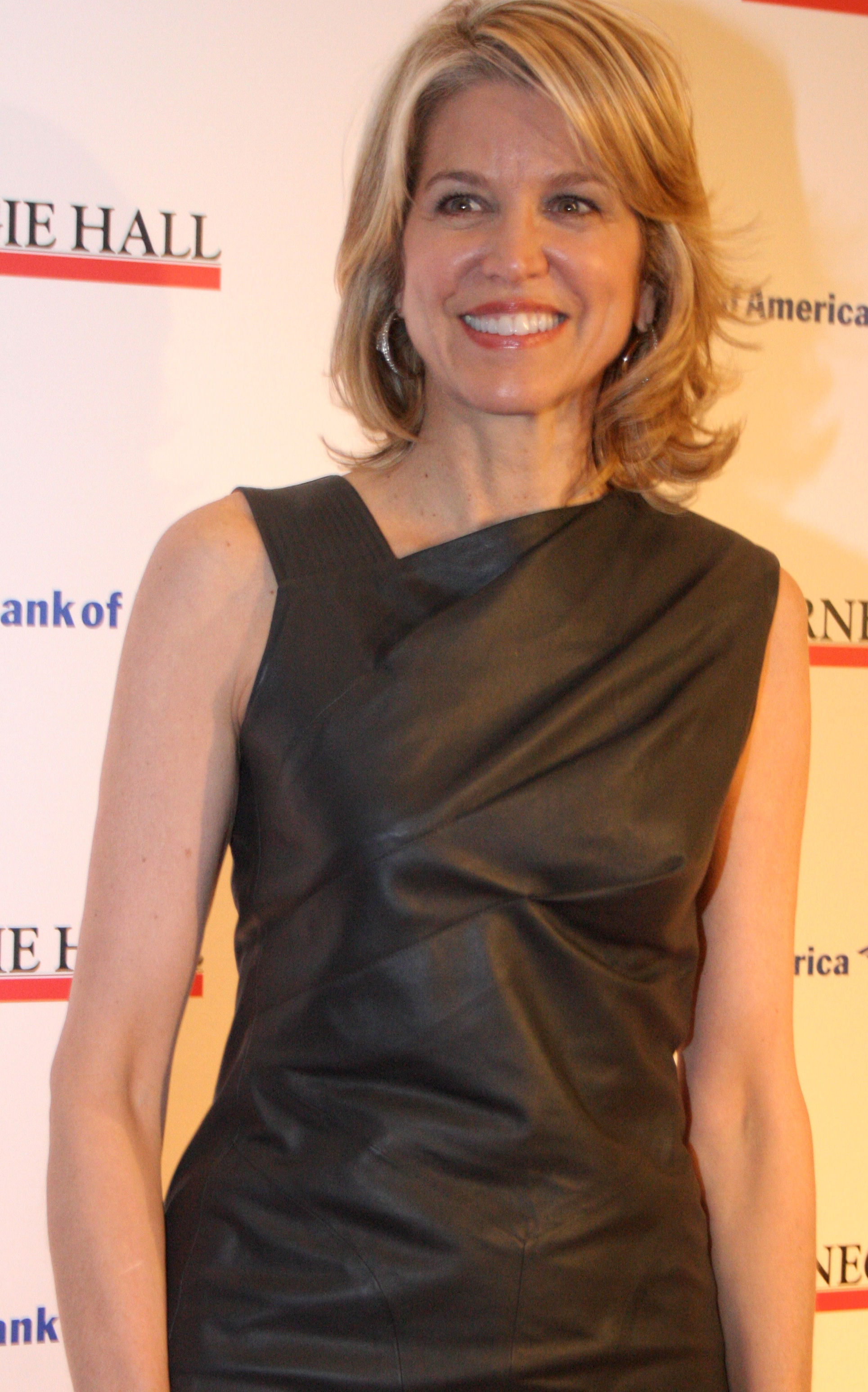
- Zahn in 2011
- Born: Paula Ann Zahn; February 24, 1956 (age 70); Omaha, Nebraska, U.S.
- Occupations: Newscaster, journalist
- Years active: 1973–present
- Spouse: Richard Cohen (m. 1987; div. 2007)
- Children: 3

Paula Ann Zahn (/zɑːn/; born February 24, 1956) is an American journalist and newscaster who has been an anchor at ABC News, CBS News, Fox News, and CNN. She currently produces and hosts the true crime documentary series On the Case with Paula Zahn on the Investigation Discovery channel.

== Early life and career ==
Zahn was born in Omaha, Nebraska, to a schoolteacher/artist mother and an IBM sales executive father. She initially grew up in Canton, Ohio, with her parents and three siblings. The family relocated to Naperville, Illinois, as her father's job required them to move frequently. She once joked that "IBM" really stood for "I've been moved". She attended Washington Junior High School in Naperville and later graduated from Naperville Central High School in 1974. Zahn also competed in several beauty pageants, making the semi-finals of the 1973 Miss Teenage America Pageant. She continued her education at Stephens College in Columbia, Missouri, on a cello scholarship, and received firsthand knowledge of the news business by working as an intern at WBBM-TV in Chicago. She graduated in 1978 with a bachelor's degree in journalism. Zahn then spent the next 10 years working at local stations around the country, including WFAA-TV in Dallas, KFMB-TV in San Diego, KPRC-TV in Houston, WHDH-TV (then WNEV) in Boston, and KCBS-TV in Los Angeles.

== National career ==
=== ABC ===
In 1987, Zahn accepted an offer to work at ABC News, initially anchoring The Health Show, a weekend program on health and medical issues. Within a few months she was co-anchoring World News This Morning, the network's early morning newscast, and anchoring news segments on Good Morning America as well as substituting for co-host Joan Lunden.

=== CBS ===
In 1990, Zahn was offered a job at CBS News, which she took beginning on February 26, 1990, co-anchoring CBS This Morning with Harry Smith. During this time, she helped cover the 1992 Winter Olympics in Albertville, France with Tim McCarver and the 1994 Winter Olympics in Lillehammer, Norway, as well as covering the Waco siege. Both she and Smith left after changes were made at the morning show in 1996 with their last day being on June 14, 1996. Zahn then went on to work as anchor of the Saturday edition of the CBS Evening News, as well as substituting for Dan Rather during the week, and contributing reports to 48 Hours, Public Eye with Bryant Gumbel, and CBS News Sunday Morning.

=== Fox News Channel ===
In 1999, after nine years at CBS News, Zahn moved to the world of cable news, joining Fox News Channel (FNC), where she anchored Fox Report, the network's nightly newscast. Months later, she helped launch her own prime time news program, The Edge with Paula Zahn.

=== CNN ===
Zahn began her work at CNN on September 11, 2001, joining anchor Aaron Brown in the coverage of that day's terrorist attacks as her reaction to the events she witnessed. Although not scheduled to appear on a CNN program, which was still in development, she began a regular morning news shift the next day. By January, she launched her CNN morning news program, American Morning with Paula Zahn.

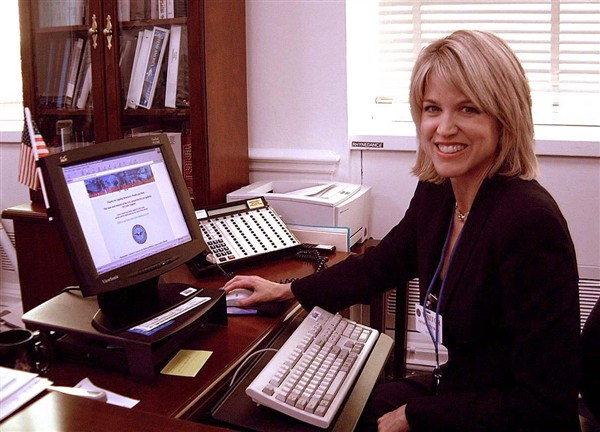
Zahn in 2002

In 2003, during the Iraq War, Zahn moved back to prime time, hosting a two-hour program labeled Live from the Headlines which offered continuing coverage of the war and other events. Anderson Cooper took over the first of the two hours by early summer, and by September, her show, Paula Zahn Now, premiered.

On July 24, 2007, she announced her resignation from CNN. The final broadcast of Paula Zahn Now aired August 2, 2007. The announcement came less than a day after CNN hired Campbell Brown, the former co-host of Weekend Today. Initially, guest hosts essentially continued Zahn's program under the title Out in the Open. This was later replaced by election campaign coverage and ultimately Brown's program, Campbell Brown: No Bias, No Bull.

According to Zahn's goodbye letter penned to CNN staff, she stated "I plan to take a break between jobs and catch my breath before I take on my next role." In a New York Times interview, which was conducted right after the announcement of her resignation broke, Zahn told Jacques Steinberg that "she had no idea what she would be doing next".

=== WNET ===
On November 9, 2008, Zahn became the new co-host of SundayArts on New York City PBS stations WNET and WLIW. The program, which covers the fine arts scene in New York City, is now called NYC-ARTS and airs Thursday evenings.

=== Investigation Discovery ===
On January 9, 2009, Discovery Communications announced that Zahn, along with producing partners Scott Weinberger and Scott Sternberg, had entered into a development deal for a true crime documentary series. On the Case with Paula Zahn premiered October 18, 2009 on the Investigation Discovery cable channel.

=== PBS ===
On New Year's Day 2011, Zahn hosted the annual "From Vienna: The New Year's Celebration" episode of the anthology series Great Performances on PBS.

== Personal life ==
Zahn has three children with Richard Cohen, a New York City real estate developer. Cohen is Jewish and they raised the children in his faith.

The couple was in the news in 2004 when the nest of the well-publicized red-tailed hawk Pale Male was removed from their Manhattan co-op building. Cohen, president of the co-op board, supported the removal; in 2001 Zahn had spoken approvingly of the hawk and its habit of feeding on rats and pigeons.

In April 2007, Zahn announced she was divorcing Cohen after 20 years of marriage. That same year, Zahn filed a lawsuit against Cohen alleging he had mismanaged 20 years' worth of her career earnings. The lawsuit was dismissed by the New York state court, ruling it "is not a commercial case, rather, it is a matrimonial dispute masquerading as a commercial dispute."

Zahn played cello at Carnegie Hall in May 1992 with the New York Pops orchestra. She is also an honorary board member of the Multiple Myeloma Research Foundation, and has been an active advocate for issues of cancer awareness in general, and breast cancer in particular.

In May 2003, Zahn received an honorary degree from Dowling College of Oakdale, New York.

Preceded by The Situation Room	CNN Weekday Lineup; 8:00PM–9:00PM	Succeeded by Larry King Live
Preceded by Jim McKay	American television prime time anchor, Winter Olympic Games; 1992 (with Tim McCarver)	Succeeded by Greg Gumbel
Preceded by Kathleen Sullivan	CBS This Morning co-anchor February 26, 1990-June 1996	Succeeded by Erin Moriarty
