= Campbell Brown (journalist) =

American journalist

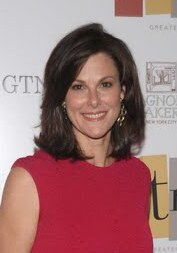
- Campbell Brown in 2012
- Born: Alma Dale Campbell Brown; June 14, 1968 (age 58); Ferriday, Louisiana, U.S.
- Education: Regis University
- Occupation: Broadcast journalist
- Notable credit(s): Co-anchor of Weekend Today; Anchor of CNN Election Center; Anchor of Campbell Brown: No Bias, No Bull; Anchor of Campbell Brown
- Spouse(s): Peregrine "Pere" Roberts (divorced); Dan Senor (2006 – present)
- Children: 2
- Parent(s): James H. Brown; Dale Campbell Fairbanks
- Awards: Emmy Award

Alma Dale Campbell Brown (born June 14, 1968) is an American who was head of global media partnerships at Meta and a former television news reporter and anchorwoman. She was a co-anchor of the NBC news program Weekend Today from 2003 to 2007, and hosted the prime time news program Campbell Brown on CNN from 2008 to 2010. Brown won an Emmy Award as part of the NBC team reporting on Hurricane Katrina. She is a senior advisor to Tollbit, a website services provider.

== Early life and family ==
Campbell Brown was born Alma Dale Campbell Brown in Ferriday, Louisiana, the daughter of the former Louisiana Democratic State Senator and Secretary of State James H. Brown Jr., and Brown's first wife, Dale Campbell. Her father was also elected three times for Louisiana Insurance Commissioner. Alma Dale was her maternal grandmother's name. Her parents divorced when she was young.

Brown was raised as a Roman Catholic, although her father is a Presbyterian. She has two sisters.

Brown grew up in Ferriday, Louisiana, and attended the Trinity Episcopal Day School. Her family was involved in hunting, politics, and cooking, "It was all about Cajun and tight-knit families and big parties," according to Brown.

She was expelled from the Madeira School for sneaking off campus to go to a party. Brown attended Louisiana State University for two years before graduating from Regis University. After graduation, she spent a year teaching English in Czechoslovakia.

== Career ==
She began her career in local news reporting for KSNT-TV, the NBC affiliate in Topeka, Kansas. She continued at WWBT-TV, the NBC affiliate in Richmond, Virginia, and also reported for WBAL-TV in Baltimore, Maryland, and WRC-TV in Washington, DC. Brown joined NBC News in 1996. She was later assigned to The Pentagon and covered the war in Kosovo. Before Weekend Today, she was the White House correspondent for NBC News.

=== Presidential election coverage in 2000 ===
During the 2000 U.S. presidential election, she covered George W. Bush, the Republican National Convention and Republican party primary elections for NBC, after which she became their White House correspondent. She was also named the main substitute anchor for Brian Williams on the NBC Nightly News.

=== CNN ===
Brown announced July 22, 2007, on Weekend Today, that she would be leaving NBC News after eleven years to devote time to her family and expected baby. After giving birth to her son in December, Brown began working for CNN in March 2008, filling the spot previously held by Paula Zahn, who left the network. Brown began anchoring Election Center, which was renamed Campbell Brown: No Bias, No Bull in October 2008, shortly before the election, in order to ensure a smooth transition afterward. Roland Martin filled in as guest host in April and May 2009 while Brown took maternity leave; when she returned in June 2009, the show was again renamed, this time simply to Campbell Brown.

In the face of low ratings, Brown asked CNN to be released from her contract. On May 18, 2010, Brown announced that she would be leaving CNN and wrote a much talked about statement where she said, “Shedding my own journalistic skin to try to inhabit the kind of persona that might coexist in that line up is simply impossible for me”. She later told the Los Angeles Times that she had originally hoped that a straight news program like hers could compete successfully against the opinion-driven shows of her competitors, Bill O'Reilly and Keith Olbermann.

After leaving CNN, Brown wrote opinion pieces for The New York Times, The Wall Street Journal, The Daily Beast and Slate. Weekly Standard editor Bill Kristol proposed that Brown run for Chuck Schumer's US Senate seat from New York.

=== Meta ===
In January 2017, Facebook announced that Brown would be joining to lead the company's news partnerships team. Her title was head of global news partnerships.

In 2018, The Hollywood Reporter named Brown one of the year’s 35 most powerful New York media figures.

Brown led the development and launch of Facebook News, a tab focused on news and lifestyle coverage, and Bulletin, a newsletter platform for marquee writers including the memoirist Mitch Albom, the magazine writer and podcaster Malcolm Gladwell and the Nobel laureate Malala Yousafzai.

In May 2022, Brown was named head of all of media partnerships at Meta. In the new role, Brown oversaw entertainment, sports, and news across all Meta platforms. Her team managed relationships with broadcasters, streamers, film studios, digital publishers, news publishers, sports teams and leagues. Brown also oversaw a global team that works with governments and policymakers on new regulations for on-platform content, and managed Meta's partnerships with fact-checkers globally working to reduce misinformation on the platform. Brown left Meta in October 2023.

=== Tollbit ===
In April 2024, Brown joined the AI startup Tollbit as a senior adviser.

== Awards ==
In 2006, Brown won an Emmy Award for her coverage on Hurricane Katrina.

== Political activism ==
After leaving journalism, Brown emerged as a major player in the harsh political battles over charter schools, prominently clashing with teachers’ unions while coming out against teacher tenure. She became an outspoken advocate for school choice and "education reform". In June 2013, Brown founded the Parents Transparency Project, a nonprofit watchdog group on behalf of parents seeking information and accountability from the teachers' unions and New York Department of Education on actions impacting children in schools. The group, working with the New York Daily News, investigated and reported on school employees who were accused of having engaged in sexual misconduct with schoolchildren but still kept their jobs.

In a January 2014 op-ed, Brown criticized teachers' unions for failing to support a bill before Congress that would require more stringent background checks for teachers. Noting that 97 tenured New York City teachers or school employees had been charged with sexual misconduct during the previous five years, she complained that while ordinary employers would exhibit zero tolerance toward such offenders, New York law required an elaborate, expensive process that involves the participation of the teachers' unions, which "prefer suspensions and fines, and not dismissal, for teachers charged with inappropriate sexual conduct." United Federation of Teachers vice president Leo Carey disputed Brown's account of this process and its outcome, but Mayor Michael Bloomberg agreed with Brown, saying that "maybe if you were a serial ax murderer, you might get a slap on the wrist."

In June 2014, Brown founded the non-profit organization Partnership for Educational Justice.

In its first major endeavor, Brown's group helped nine New York families organize and file a lawsuit against New York state, challenging the state's teacher tenure, teacher dismissal, and "Last In, First Out" seniority statutes. In Wright v. New York, filed in New York City on July 28, 2014, the plaintiffs claim that these teacher tenure, dismissal, and seniority policies violated their children's state constitutional right to a "sound basic education". Brown said she hoped that taking the issue of teacher tenure reform to the courts would "force a new legislative process" around New York's tenure policies.

In September 2014, the case was consolidated with another lawsuit challenging New York tenure laws, and continued litigation as Davids v. New York. In June 2024, the case was dismissed.

=== The 74 ===
In July 2015, Brown co-founded The 74, a non-profit, news site covering education in America; it gets its name from the fact that there are roughly 74 million children under the age of 18 in the United States. The 74 receives funding from a variety of charter school advocacy groups including the Walton Family Foundation, the Doris & Donald Fisher Fund and Bloomberg Philanthropies. According to a report in the Los Angeles Times, critics accuse The 74 of being pro-charter schools and anti-union.

== Other memberships ==
Brown is currently on the boards of the Reuters Institute for the Study of Journalism, the Board of Governors at the Paley Center for Media, and the advisory board of Success Academy Charter Schools, a New York City charter school network.

== Personal life ==
Brown was married to a Washington, D.C. real estate broker, Peregrine Roberts, for two years.

Brown met Dan Senor in Iraq in March 2004. Senor was then spokesman for the Coalition Provisional Authority in Iraq and Baghdad and Brown was one of the journalists covering the war. According to The New York Times, "their first date was a group dinner with Tom Brokaw and another journalist". Senor and Brown married at the Beaver Creek Chapel in Beaver Creek, Colorado on April 2, 2006. Brown converted to Judaism, her husband's faith.

On June 24, 2007, Brown announced on Weekend Today that she and her husband were expecting their first baby. On December 18, 2007, Brown gave birth to their son, Eli James Senor, named after his grandfather, James Senor.

In an August 2008 article, Brown addressed charges that her marriage to Senor, who at the time was working as an advisor for the Mitt Romney presidential campaign, represented a conflict of interest for her as a journalist. Brown noted that such marriages were commonplace in Washington with NBC reporters Chuck Todd married to a Democratic consultant, Andrea Mitchell married to Fed chair Alan Greenspan and Mika Brzezinski a blood relative of several members of the political world.

On October 27, 2008, during a guest appearance on The Daily Show, Brown announced her second pregnancy. On April 6, 2009, Brown gave birth to her second son, Asher Liam Senor.

== In popular culture ==
Brown made a cameo as a reporter in the 1997 movie Contact.

In 2012, Brown performed as a "broadcast journalist" in the play 8.

Brown was portrayed by the actress and comedian Tracey Ullman in her Showtime comedy series Tracey Ullman's State of the Union, and by Kristen Wiig on Saturday Night Live.

Media offices
Preceded by Soledad O'Brien	Weekend Today Co-Anchor with Lester Holt; 2003 – July 22, 2007	Succeeded by Amy Robach (Saturday); Jenna Wolfe (Sunday)
