= Stand Up! with Pete Dominick =

Stand Up! With Pete Dominick
- Other names: Pete's Big Mouth (Feb 2008 – Nov 2008)
- Genre: Talk radio Political talk News talk Call-in
- Running time: 180 minutes
- Country of origin: United States
- Language: English
- Home station: SiriusXM Satellite Radio
- Hosted by: Pete Dominick
- Produced by: Melanie Starling; Chris Hauselt
- Executive producer: Alfred Schulz
- Recording studio: New York, NY
- Original release: February 21, 2008 – October 11, 2019
- Website: Official web site

Stand Up! with Pete Dominick was a morning prop-comedy talk show airing weekdays from 9:00 AM – 12:00 PM ET from the SiriusXM studios in New York City and broadcast on the P.O.T.U.S. (Sirius XM) Insight channel, heard on the Sirius Satellite Radio and XM Satellite Radio platforms. The show was hosted by stand-up comedian and politics enthusiast Pete Dominick and produced by Alfred Schulz, Melanie Starling, and Chris Hauselt.

The focus of the three-hour program each day ranged from current events, politics, environmental issues, prop-comedy, veterans affairs to parenting.

== History ==
The show was launched February 21, 2008, as Pete's Big Mouth and aired exclusively on Sirius under the now-defunct Indie Talk channel with the team of Pete Dominick as host, Sean Bertollo as executive producer, Aaron Hodges as co-producer, and Alexandra Di Trolio as co-producer and blogcaster.

As a result of the Sirius and XM merger, on November 12, 2008, the Indie Talk channel on Sirius was combined with the P.O.T.U.S. '08 channel on XM to form the current P.O.T.U.S. channel broadcasting on both platforms. Under the new arrangement only two Indie Talk programs were not canceled, The Ron Silver Show (no longer aired) and Pete's Big Mouth, renamed Stand Up! With Pete Dominick with the same structure and format.

The show was not dissimilar from programs that previously ran on Air America (formerly Air America Radio and Air America Media) a now defunct radio station that specialized in progressive talk programming. Ratings for the show are not easy to find and while it had a loyal following of progressive listeners it does not compete with any conservative radio programs.

Starting Feb. 11, 2013 Pete Dominick ended his afternoon call-in and interview program on SiriusXM’s Potus politics channel and moved to a renamed male-oriented Indie channel (formerly Stars Too) in a prime three-hour block, 6 to 9 a.m. Eastern Time, with a repeat for the West Coast.

His show maintained its name, "Stand Up! With Pete Dominick," but was updated to not be "stuck in the paradigm of politics," said Dominick, in an interview at SiriusXM’s Manhattan offices. He said he planned to explore religion, race, energy, education policy, veterans’ issues and even parenting.

As of January 2015, the show was broadcast on SiriusXM Insight 121, as part of a new, exclusive, groundbreaking news, information, and entertainment radio channel.

== Cancellation ==
On October 11, 2019, following two days of an unexpected absence from live broadcasting, Dominick announced through a recorded message at the start of his normal time slot that Sirius XM failed to renew his contract with the satellite radio platform, and Dominick had decided to "end the show early". It was unclear how long the show could have continued had it lasted through the final days of the contract.

== Show format ==
=== Program summary ===
The show began every weekday with Dominick taking less than a minute to introduce the day's programming and guest lineup. Each hour of the program was usually divided into three segments, split up by blogcasts at 20 minutes and 50 minutes after the hour plus syndicated breaking news at the top of the hour from AP Radio News. Every day the show typically featured two or three guests interviewed about the important political events of the previous few days, often with listeners being encouraged to call in with their questions or comments for the guest at 1-877-974-7487 or by email. Where scheduling permitted, Dominick opened up the phone lines and/or read listener emails on a specified topic.

=== Guest interviews ===
The guests featured on the show were chosen for their unique insight, perspective, or knowledge of current issues and events on state and federal levels. Issues typically covered with guest interviews were: national security, economic policies, state legislation, climate issues, foreign policy, alternative energy sources, state government issues, social policies, etc. Some of the guests that appeared on the show were:

- Noam Chomsky, linguist, political commentator, public intellectual;
- Michael Scheuer, former CIA analyst;
- Tim Wise, prominent anti-racist activist and writer;
- David Kilcullen, former senior counterinsurgency advisor to General David Petraeus;
- Bernie Sanders, U.S. Senator from Vermont;
- Dahr Jamail, independent journalist;
- Evan Wolfson, civil rights attorney and advocate;
- Barney Frank, Congressman from Massachusetts;
- Matt Taibbi, national affairs correspondent with Rolling Stone;
- Ann Coulter, social and political commentator, columnist, and author;
- Lloyd Chapman, president of the American Small Business League;
- Jesse Ventura, former governor of Minnesota.
- Barry Ritholtz, financial blogger and Bloomberg columnist
- Colonel Morris D. Davis,third Chief Prosecutor of the Guantanamo military commissions

=== Listener call-in ===
Dominick often stressed the value and importance of listeners calling in to the program because, as he described it, that was the essence of the show. The phrase "stand up" in the title was intended to reference the "people of the United States", with the show functioning as an intersection of the power players making the headlines and the American people they impact. "Political talk for the rest of us" was the guiding principle of the program; the quintessential feature that set the show apart in the world of talk radio was the sheer number and diversity of callers that were allowed to voice their concerns, with Dominick giving priority to dissenting view points.

=== Regular segments ===
The show also featured three regularly scheduled entertaining segments:

1. Daily the show featured the currently most popular threads on the message board being highlighted, to bring them to the attention of the listening audience and encourage participation on the message boards.

2. On Wednesdays the show featured "Check Your Priorities," a segment that explored how "the most popular and most widely read stories on the internet aren't always the most important" with Dominick, Aaron Hodges, and Brian Dominick examining these stories with humorous banter, which was then followed by a description of "the stories we think you should be paying attention to."

3. On Fridays the show featured "D.O.T.U.S. of the Week" at the close of the show, where listeners could call in to cast their vote for the week's biggest idiot, as it were. The fun and light-hearted contest of nominees were chosen by staff plus a selected listener nomination, for a total of four nominees who had in some way done or said something rather stupid that week. The nominee with the highest number of votes was crowned the D.O.T.U.S. of the Week. (On a humorous note, people were prohibited from nominating former Vice President Dick Cheney—because he always won.)

4 The show also occasionally featured a segment titled "United States of Apathy," where one of the staff or a listener chose a person they think is not informed enough about political facts or current events, who was then tested with a series of trivia questions pertaining to the politics of the United States, usually with humorous results.
