= Rick Sanchez (journalist) =

Cuban-American journalist (born 1958)

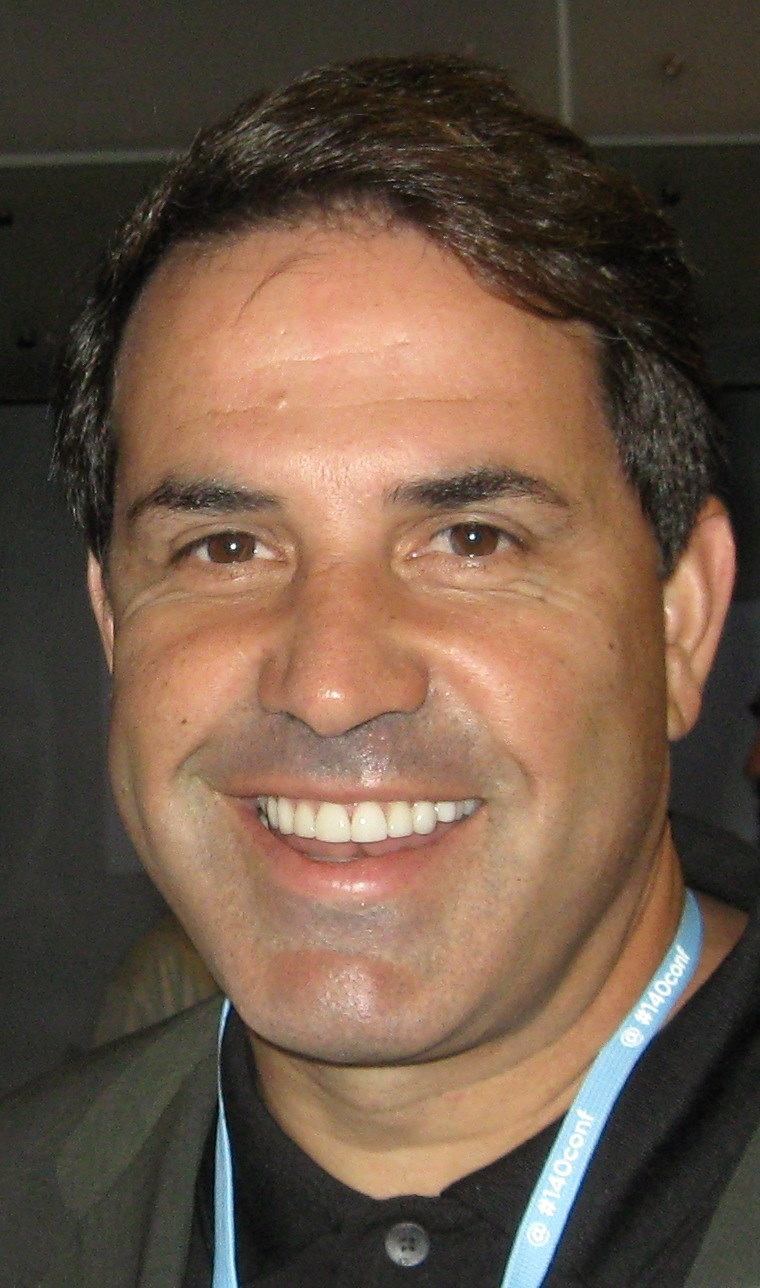
- Sánchez in 2009
- Born: Ricardo León Sánchez de Reinaldo; July 3, 1958 (age 68); Guanabacoa, Cuba
- Occupation: anchor/correspondent
- Spouse: Suzanne
- Children: 4

Ricardo León Sánchez de Reinaldo (born July 3, 1958) is a Cuban-American journalist, radio host, and author. After working as the lead local anchor on Miami's WSVN, Sánchez moved to cable news, first as a daytime anchor at MSNBC, later at CNN, where he began as a correspondent and ultimately rose to become an anchor. On CNN, he hosted a show Rick's List and served as a contributor to Anderson Cooper 360° and CNN International, where he frequently reported and translated between English and Spanish. Sánchez was fired from CNN on October 1, 2010, following controversial remarks he made on a radio program. In July 2011, Sánchez was hired by Florida International University, to serve as a color commentator for radio broadcasts of the school's football team. He worked as a columnist for Fox News and Fox News Latino, and a former correspondent for Spanish language network Mundo Fox. He began working for RT in 2019, where he has hosted several shows, and moved to Moscow in 2025.

== Early life ==
Sánchez was born in Guanabacoa, Cuba, a township of Havana, and emigrated to the United States with his parents at the age of two. He grew up in Hialeah, Florida, a suburb of Miami, and attended Mae M. Walters Elementary School, Henry H. Filer Middle School, and Hialeah High School, graduating in 1977. Sánchez accepted a football scholarship to Minnesota State University Moorhead and transferred to the University of Minnesota in Minneapolis on a CBS/WCCO Journalism Scholarship in 1979.

Of his childhood, Sánchez has said: "I grew up not speaking English, dealing with real prejudice every day as a kid; watching my dad work in a factory, wash dishes, drive a truck, get spit on. I've been told that I can't do certain things in life simply because I was a Hispanic." He prefers to be called Rick Sánchez rather than use his birth name. In a newscast in 2009, he said: "I want to be respectful of this wonderful country that allowed us as Hispanics to come here, and I think it's easier if someone's able to understand me by Anglicizing my name."

== Career ==
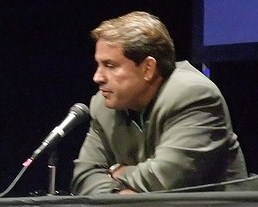
Sánchez representing CNN at the 140 Characters Conference in 2009

=== First years ===
Sánchez began his broadcasting career at WCCO's satellite sister station KCMT (now KCCO-TV) in Alexandria, Minnesota, while still in college. He was hired at then-NBC affiliate WSVN (formerly WCKT) in Miami in 1982 and became a weekend anchor shortly thereafter. He won an Emmy Award in 1983 for his series When I Left Cuba. In 1986, Sánchez left WSVN for CBS affiliate KHOU in Houston, then two years later, he returned to WSVN and began an afternoon anchor position with the station, which would switch its affiliation to Fox the following year. Sánchez was hired at MSNBC in 2001. In 2003, Sánchez left MSNBC to return to the Miami/Ft. Lauderdale TV market, where he hosted a local talk show on WTVJ. He later anchored on then-WB affiliated WBZL (now WSFL) until he joined CNN.

=== CNN anchor ===
Sánchez joined CNN in 2004, filing domestic and international reports. On January 18, 2010, he began hosting Rick's List, a two-hour show in the afternoons where he invited viewers to share their opinions and questions via social media. His use of social networking tools to create a citizen-driven news program was recognized by the Newseum in Washington, D.C.

==== Termination and aftermath ====
On September 30, 2010, Sánchez was interviewed on Sirius XM's radio show Stand Up With Pete Dominick. Sánchez's interview occurred on the final day of his show in the 8 p.m. time slot, and he was reported to be angry about being replaced by CNN's new Parker Spitzer talk show as well as occasional The Daily Show jokes made at his expense:

It's not just the Right that does this. 'Cause I've known a lot of, you know, elite Northeast establishment liberals that may not use this as a business model, but deep down when they look at a guy like me, they see a guy automatically who belongs in the second tier and not the top tier. ... I had a guy who works here at CNN who's a top brass come to me one day and say,... 'You know what, I don't want you anchoring anymore. I really don't see you as an anchor. I see you more as a reporter. I see you more as a John Quiñones....' Did he not realize that he was telling me, 'When I see you, I think of Hispanic reporters'? 'Cause in his mind, I can't be an anchor. An anchor's what you give the high-profile White guys, you know? So he knocks me down to that and compares me to that, and it happens all the time. I think to a certain extent Jon Stewart and Colbert are the same way. I think Jon Stewart's a bigot.

After Dominick questioned him, Sánchez retracted the term bigot and referred to Stewart as "prejudicial" and "uninformed," but he defended feeling discriminated, saying, "He's upset that someone of my ilk is almost at his level" and that Stewart is "not just a comedian. He can make and break careers." When queried on the issue of whether Stewart likewise belonged to a minority group on account of Stewart's Jewish faith, Sánchez responded:

Yeah, very powerless people. [laughs] He's such a minority. I mean, you know, please. What—are you kidding? I'm telling you that everybody who runs CNN is a lot like Stewart, and a lot of people who run all the other networks are a lot like Stewart. And to imply that somehow they, the people in this country who are Jewish, are an oppressed minority?

A day after his remarks, CNN announced that Sánchez was no longer employed with the company.

Certain accounts suggest Sánchez's departure was motivated by other reasons. CNN president Jonathan Klein, who was a supporter of Sánchez and had given him increased air time, was fired just one week before Sánchez, leading some to believe that Sánchez's firing may have been motivated by other reasons in addition to the comments. A contributor to New York magazine wrote: "The rumor that Sánchez was already on his way out in the wake of former CNN president Jonathan Klein's ouster from the company has been circling the Sánchez story."

During his time at CNN, Sánchez once called President Barack Obama a "cotton-picking president", a remark for which he apologized, explaining that he had grown up in the Southern United States where the phrase was a colloquialism. He had also falsely attributed quotes to Rush Limbaugh, for which he later apologized.

Despite his firing, upon leaving CNN, Sánchez said, "I want to go on record to say that I have nothing but the highest regard for CNN and for my six wonderful years with them. I appreciate every opportunity that they have given me, and it has been a wonderful experience working for them."

In the days after the incident, Sánchez apologized several times. In an appearance on Good Morning America, Sánchez told George Stephanopoulos: "I said some things I shouldn't have said. They were wrong. Not only were they wrong, they were offensive." He added, "I apologize and it was wrong for me to be so careless and so inartful. ... But it happened and I can't take it back and, you know what, now I have to stand up and be responsible."

Sánchez personally apologized to Stewart. He released a statement expressing regret for his "inartful" comments, adding, "I am very much opposed to hate and intolerance, in any form, and I have frequently spoken out against prejudice." On October 20, 2010, Jon Stewart told Larry King that Sánchez should not have been fired for what Sánchez said in the radio interview; Stewart called the firing "absolute insanity", and stating that he was not "personally hurt".

In a letter to Abraham Foxman, the head of the Anti-Defamation League (ADL), Sánchez apologized once again, writing,

[T]here are no words strong enough for me to express my regret and sorrow over what I said. It was offensive, and I deeply, sincerely and unequivocally apologize for the hurt that I have caused. I tell my children that when they make a mistake, they should take responsibility, atone and work to repair whatever they have done. ... I cannot undo the offense or controversy I caused; all I can do is to try and learn from this experience and strive to become a better person.

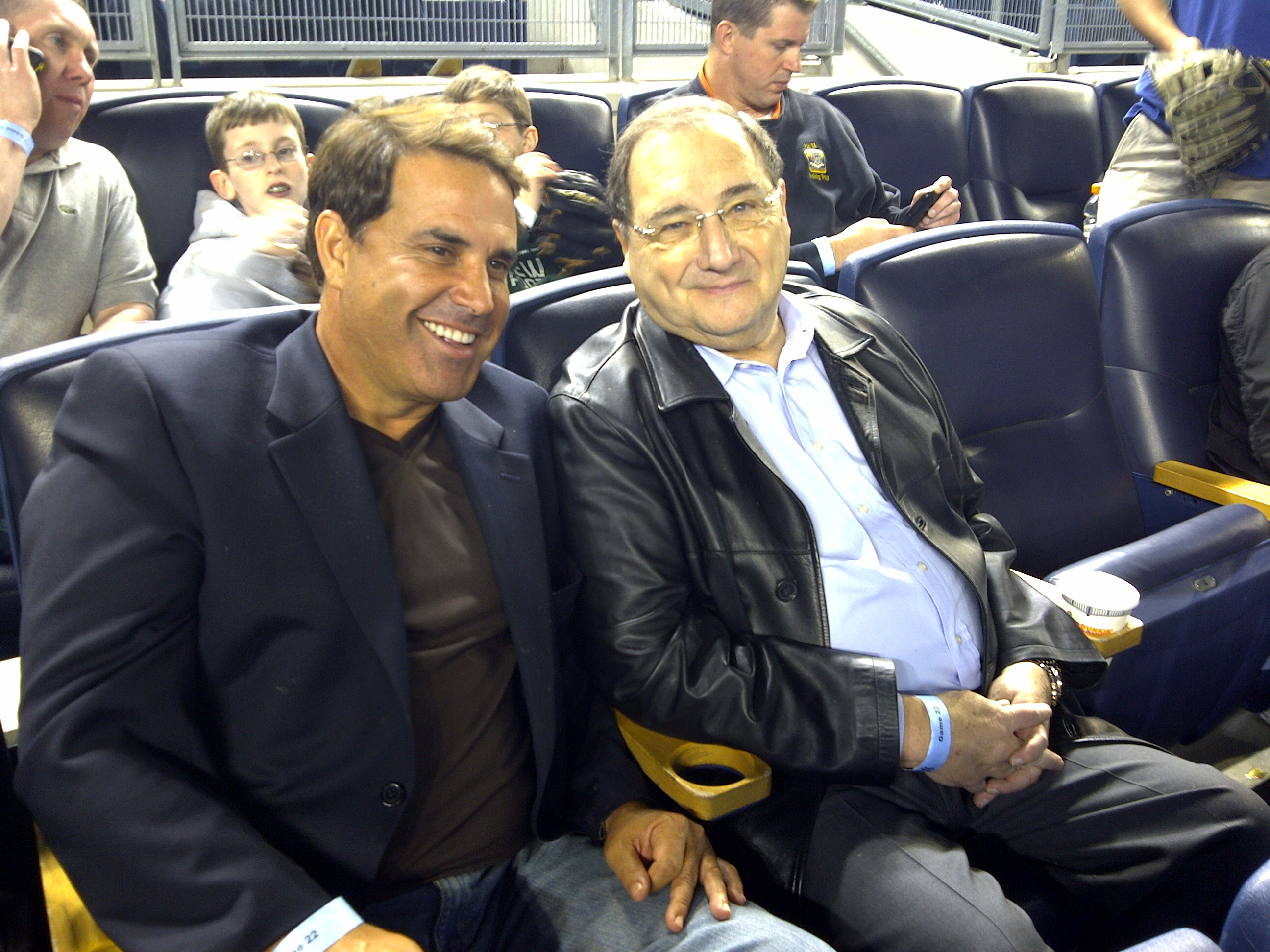
Sanchez and Abraham H. Foxman at a Yankees Game together on May 11, 2011

Following a meeting with Foxman, Foxman said Sánchez could now "put the matter to rest", adding that he hoped Sánchez could move on with his life and work.

In late 2010, Orthodox Rabbi Shmuley Boteach held a public event at Manhattan's Carlebach Synagogue with Sánchez, and commented, "Our community has enough problems without looking for anti-Semitism where it doesn't exist. Rick Sánchez was humiliated and his reputation dragged through the mud. ... The Jewish religion says that a man's most cherished possession is his good name. Rick deserves the opportunity to reclaim his." Sánchez and Rabbi Boteach spoke for nearly two hours.

In 2011, Sánchez visited Israel as part of an ADL-sponsored trip for Latino journalists. Sánchez spoke at the ADL's National Executive Committee Meeting in 2012, where Sánchez recounted, "the long and unexpected voyage ... [and] personal journey that led me to a man I now call a friend: Abe Foxman, who has led me to know myself and led me to grow in unexpected ways."

=== Radio football announcer ===
On July 27, 2011, The Washington Post reported that Sánchez had started a job as a radio announcer for Florida International University. Beginning in September 2011, Sánchez provided analysis of the FIU football team.

=== Fox News and radio engagements ===
Rick Sánchez returned to cable news as a columnist on Fox News Latino in September 2012. Sánchez was offered short-term employment with the website. Since joining Fox News Latino, he has appeared on the Fox News Channel as a contributor. He also started as a news contributor for MundoFox at the end of 2012. In 2013, Sánchez returned to South Florida with a weekday show on Clear Channel-owned Newsradio 610 WIOD. Replacing Todd Schnitt in afternoon drive time, Sánchez did a stint on a morning show that led into The Rush Limbaugh Show. Due to low ratings, the show was eventually canceled.

=== RT and move to Russia ===
He began working for RT America in 2019, anchoring "The News with Rick Sanchez". After moving to Moscow in 2025, he became host of "Sanchez Effect", RT International's "flagship show". The program's first episode featured an interview with top Putin aide Vladimir Medinsky. Sanchez's work on RT is broadcast internationally in English and Spanish.

== Family life ==
Sánchez and his wife, Suzanne, have three sons and one daughter.

=== DUI incident ===
On December 10, 1990, Sánchez, driving home, struck a man who ran into the path of Sánchez's car. The man became paralyzed after being hit.

Sánchez was not charged with causing the accident; however, he was charged with driving under the influence (DUI) and pleaded no contest.
