= Save the Males =

Save the Males: Why Men Matter. Why Women Should Care
- Author: Kathleen Parker
- Language: English
- Subject: Gender studies
- Published: June 2008 (Random House)
- ISBN: 978-1-4000-6579-0
- Dewey Decimal: 306.874/2
- LC Class: HQ1090 .P367 2008

Save the Males: Why Men Matter. Why Women Should Care is a book written by Pulitzer Prize winner Kathleen Parker, and was published in 2008 by Random House. The book's main theme is based around the premise that modern feminism isn't what it used to be; in the past, this movement was fighting for the equality of the genders.

== Contents ==
Parker claims "as feminism has reached most of the goals of equality... women have become hostile toward men and maleness in what seems to be a spirit of retributive justice." There are arguments for the idea that feminism has transformed from being something that was supposed to help women gain power in society. Instead it has become a tool for modern women to put men down. Using references to popular culture such as Murphy Brown and The Vagina Monologues, Parker points out how the media has slowly begun to portray men as brutish idiots or sexual predators, and the manners in which men are often portrayed today are doing more harm to families than many people realize. Murphy Brown and other shows that glorify the idea of being a single mother are doing a large amount of damage to the idea of the father as a possible caregiver. Ideas like this are used to support the argument that a more progressive, and male inclusive fourth-wave of feminism is in order.

=== Other topics ===
- No-fault divorce – Parker argues that due to the common portrayals of men, it is easier to file for divorce and win custody of children as a woman.
- Sperm donation – Due to the recession toward the end of the 2000s sperm donations have been on the rise, sperm banks have made it possible to turn single motherhood into a "sophisticated act of self-fulfillment". More mothers are choosing to forego the father as they could only be seen as "sperm and a wallet" anyway.

== Reception ==
Reviews of Save the Males were mixed. Publishers Weekly said in their review, "Although Parker's deliberate provocations make for lively reading, the majority of her claims are too fanciful and unsubstantiated to be genuinely thought provoking or even interesting." Dylan Hales, writing for the Charleston City Paper, expressed mixed feelings on the book, saying, "Parker's tone jumps wildly from cynicism to seriousness and back again. Her pithy one-liners and sharp-witted observations often make for laughs, but they take away from the serious discussion her book seeks to become a part of. At times, the book comes across like a string of op-ed columns... Parker’s instincts may be right and her prose can be delightful, but the scattershot tone of the book is a weakness." The New York Times's Liesl Schillinger called it "arresting, entertaining and serious". Christine Whelan praised "Kathleen Parker’s sharp and witty criticism of the American male-bashing culture".
