= Kathleen Parker =

American journalist

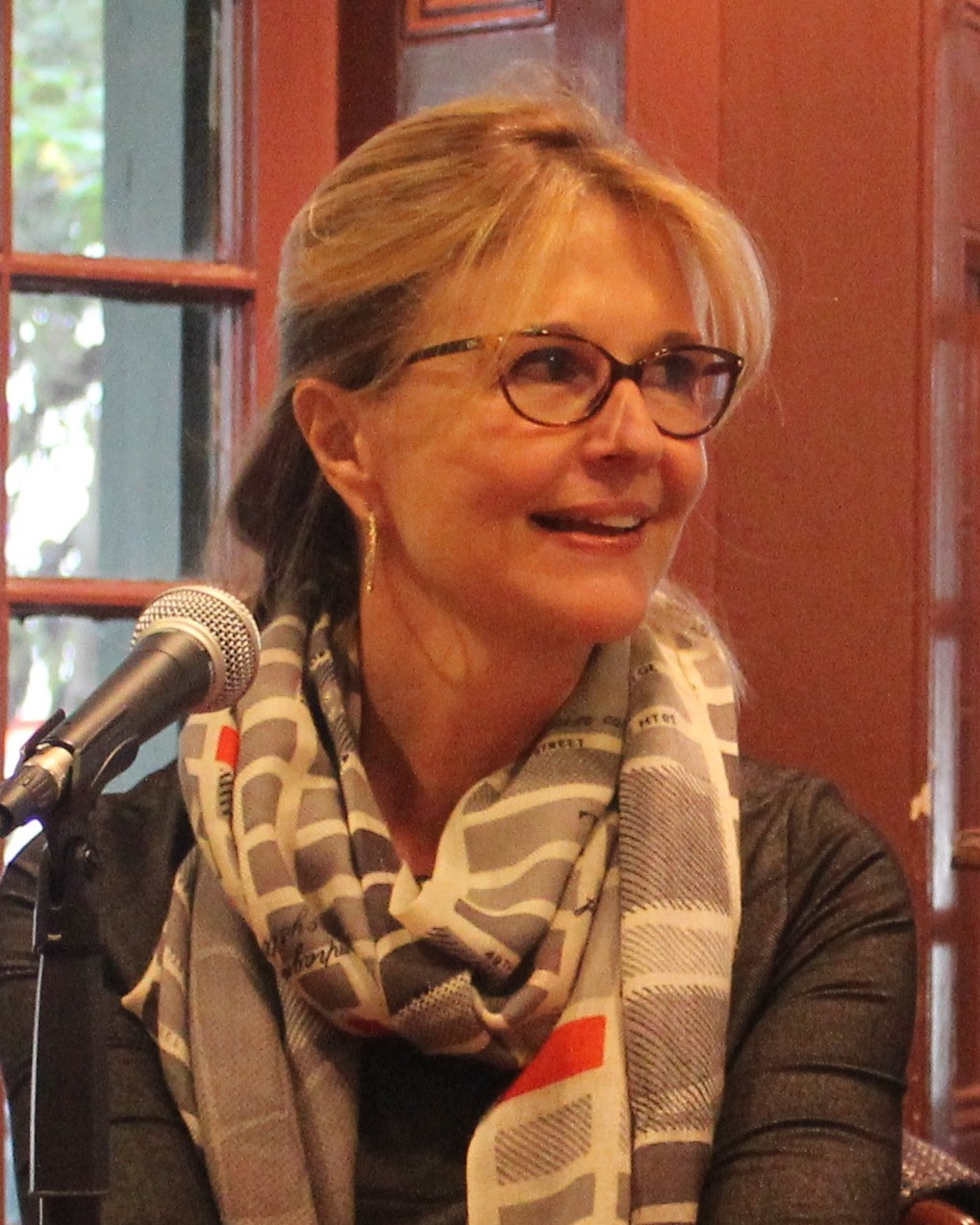
- Parker in 2016
- Born: 1951 (age 74–75); Winter Haven, Florida, U.S.
- Education: Converse University (attended); Florida State University (BA, MA)
- Spouse: Woody Cleveland
- Children: 1

Kathleen Parker (born 1951/1952) is a columnist for The Washington Post. Parker is a consulting faculty member at the Buckley School of Public Speaking, a popular guest on cable and network news programs and a regular guest on NBC's Meet the Press, and previously on MSNBC's Hardball with Chris Matthews.

Parker considers herself politically to be "mostly right of center", and has been described as a "conservative-leaning columnist".

== Early life and education ==
Parker was raised in Winter Haven in Polk County, Florida, daughter of lawyer John Hal Connor Jr. and Connor's first wife, Martha Ayer Harley (originally from Barnwell County, South Carolina who died in March 1955 when Parker was 3 years old). Parker often spent summers with her mother's family in Columbia, South Carolina.

Parker attended Converse College before Florida State University, where she received a bachelor's degree in 1973 followed by a master's degree in Spanish in 1976.

== Media career ==
Parker's career in journalism began in 1977, when she was hired to cover Hanahan, Goose Creek and Moncks Corner by the now-defunct Charleston Evening Post.

She has written for several magazines, including The Weekly Standard, Time, Town & Country, Cosmopolitan, and Fortune Small Business. She is on the Board of Contributors for USA Today's Forum Page, part of the newspaper's Opinion section. She is a contributor to the online magazine The Daily Beast. Parker is the author of Save the Males: Why Men Matter, Why Women Should Care.

From fall 2010, Parker co-hosted the cable news program Parker Spitzer on CNN with former New York governor Eliot Spitzer.

Parker was the 1993 winner of the H. L. Mencken Writing Award presented by The Baltimore Sun. The Week magazine named her one of the nation's top five columnists in 2004 and 2005. She won the 2010 Pulitzer Prize for Commentary for a selection of political opinion columns.

During the 2008 U.S. presidential election Parker called on the Republican vice-presidential nominee, Governor Sarah Palin, to step down from the party ticket (the day before the Vice-Presidential debate), saying that a series of media interviews showed that Palin was "clearly out of her league". Parker received over 11,000 responses, mostly from conservatives critical of her opinion.

During the 2018 Brett Kavanaugh Supreme Court nomination, Parker wrote a column advancing the theory that the alleged victim, Christine Blasey Ford, was mistaken in her identification of Brett Kavanaugh, and that there must be a doppelgänger. The doppelgänger theory was criticized by other Washington Post columnists, such as Max Boot, Erik Wemple, Jennifer Rubin, E. J. Dionne, and Avi Selk.

In 2018, she authored a Washington Post column titled, "Calm down. Roe v. Wade isn’t going anywhere." Four years later, Roe v. Wade was overruled by the Supreme Court's conservative majority.

Parker wrote about the April 2019 arrest of WikiLeaks founder Julian Assange in the Embassy of Ecuador, London, comparing him unfavorably to the "historic act of bravery" by Daniel Ellsberg, who leaked the Pentagon Papers about American government lies in the Vietnam War. Assange's "non-fans—including many in the U.S. media—long have viewed him as a sociopathic interloper operating under the protection of free speech.".

== Personal life ==
Parker is married to an attorney, Sherwood M. "Woody" Cleveland, has one son and two stepsons, and resides in Camden, South Carolina.
