= Small Wars Journal =

Online magazine

- Editor: Dave Dilegge
- Categories: Counter-insurgency, military science
- Frequency: Irregular
- Publisher: Small Wars Foundation
- Founded: 2005
- Country: United States
- Based in: Bethesda, Maryland
- Language: English
- Website: smallwarsjournal.com
- ISSN: 2156-227X
- OCLC: 229127994

The Small Wars Journal (SWJ) is an online magazine focusing on intrastate conflict. Aside from its online magazine, SWJ hosts an accompanying blog and the Small Wars Council discussion board. Other site features include an online reference library, recommended reading and event listings. The magazine is published by the Small Wars Foundation, a non-profit corporation.

The title refers to the 1940 United States Marine Corps Small Wars Manual, which used "small wars" as a catch-all term for unconventional and guerrilla warfare, also encompassing foreign internal defense (FID), military operations other than war (MOOTW), and military operations in urban terrain (MOUT).

== History ==
The Small Wars Journal is an evolution of the MOUT Homepage, Urban Operations Journal, and urbanoperations.com, all formerly run by SWJ's editor-in-chief Dave Dilegge.

== Tribal Engagement Workshop ==
On March 24 and 25, 2010, the Small Wars Foundation conducted a Tribal Engagement Workshop in Fredericksburg, Virginia. The workshop was cosponsored by the Small Wars Foundation, the U.S. Joint Forces Command Joint Irregular Warfare Center, the U.S. Marine Corps Center for Irregular Warfare, the U.S. Army / U.S. Marine Corps Counterinsurgency Center, and Noetic Group. The objectives of the Tribal Engagement Workshop were to evaluate the value and feasibility of a tribal engagement approach in Afghanistan, assess the secondary effects adoption of a tribal engagement strategy would have on the political and military situation and to identify the operational components of a tribal engagement approach in Afghanistan.

== Reception ==
Rolling Stone magazine recognized SWJ in their 2009 "Hot List" edition.

A 2012 SWJ article caused controversy in its exploration of a hypothetical military operation in which an extremist group sympathetic to the Tea Party movement takes over Darlington, South Carolina and clashes with federal troops. Conservative groups criticized the article, suggesting it reflected misplaced priorities.
