= David Kilcullen =

Australian author and counterinsurgency expert (born 1967)

Lt. Col. (res.) David John Kilcullen
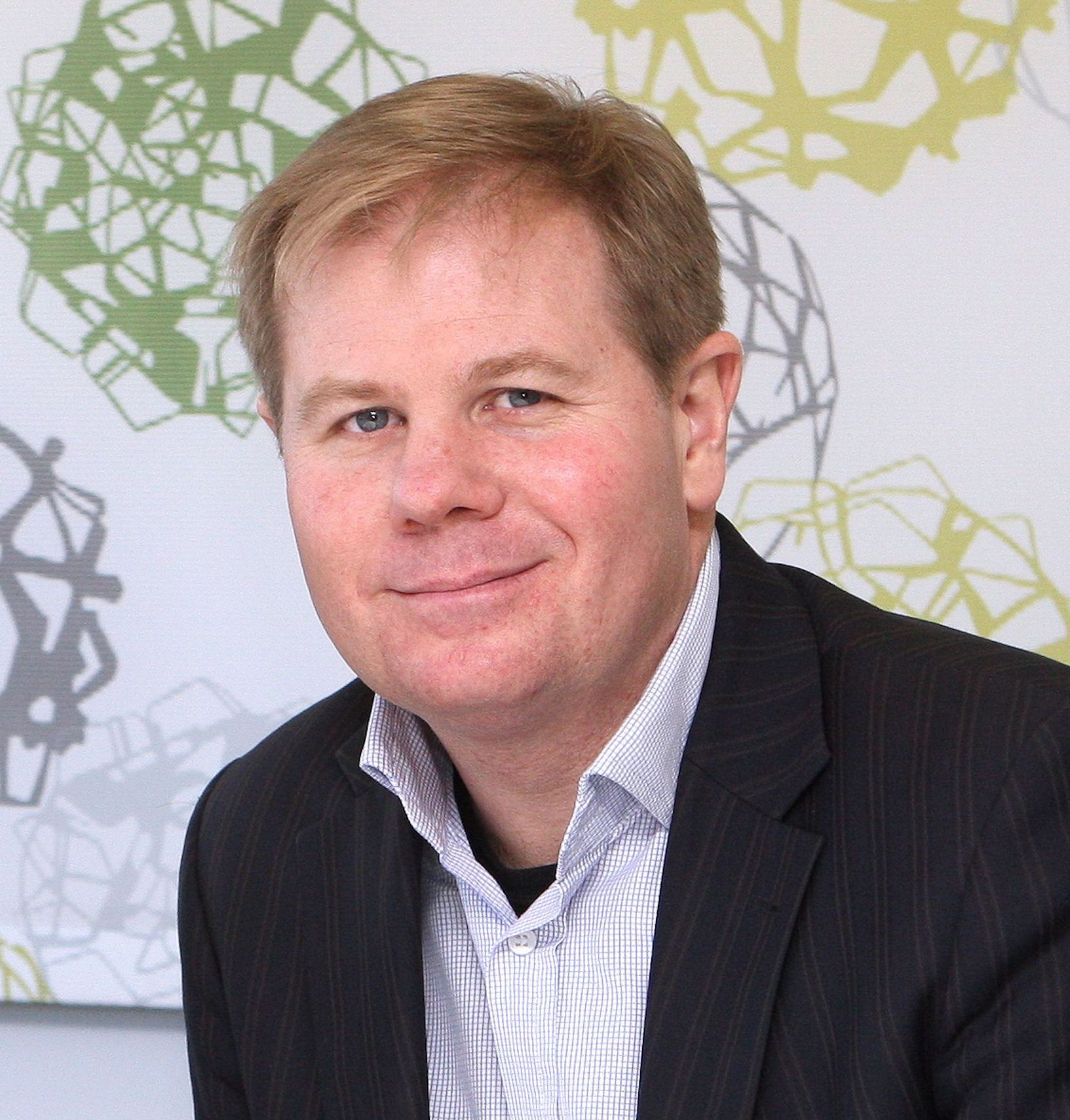
- Born: 1967 (age 58–59)
- Education: University of New South Wales; Australian Defence Force Academy
- Alma mater: Royal Military College, Duntroon
- Known for: Theory and practice of counter-insurgency and conflict ethnography
- Awards: United States Army Superior Civilian Service Medal

David John Kilcullen FRGS (born 1967) is an Australian author, strategist, and counterinsurgency expert and current president of the Cordillera Applications Group. Previously he served as non-executive chairman of Caerus Associates, a strategy and design consulting firm that he founded. He is a professor at Arizona State University and at University of New South Wales, Canberra.

From 2005 to 2006, he was chief strategist in the Office of the Coordinator for Counterterrorism at the U.S. State Department. Kilcullen was a senior counter-insurgency advisor to General David Petraeus in 2007 and 2008, where he helped design and monitor the Iraq War troop surge. He was then a special advisor for counter-insurgency to Secretary of State Condoleezza Rice. Kilcullen has been a senior fellow of the Center for a New American Security and an adjunct professor at the Paul H. Nitze School of Advanced International Studies at Johns Hopkins University. Highly critical of the decision to invade Iraq, he is on record as saying "There undeniably would be no ISIS if we had not invaded Iraq." Kilcullen has written six books: The Accidental Guerrilla, Counterinsurgency, Out of the Mountains, Blood Year, The Dragons and the Snakes: How the Rest Learned to Fight the West and The Ledger: Accounting for Failure in Afghanistan.

== Education ==
Kilcullen graduated from St Pius X College in 1984. He then attended the Australian Defence Force Academy and completed a Bachelor of Arts with honours in military art and science through the University of New South Wales and graduated as a distinguished graduate and was awarded the Chief of Defence Force Army Prize in 1989. He took his army officer training at the Royal Military College, Duntroon. After twelve months of training in Indonesia, Kilcullen graduated from the Australian Defence Force School of Languages in 1993 with an advanced diploma in applied linguistics. He is fluent in Indonesian and speaks some Arabic and French.

Kilcullen received a Ph.D. in politics from the University of New South Wales at the Australian Defence Force Academy in 2000. His thesis, entitled The Political Consequences of Military Operations in Indonesia 1945–99: A Fieldwork Analysis of the Political Power-Diffusion Effects of Guerrilla Conflict, focused on the effects of guerrilla warfare on non-state political systems in traditional societies. He drew on ethnographic methods to research traditional systems of governance in East Timor and Papua.

His research centred on investigating power diffusion in Indonesia during the Darul Islam Era of 1948 to 1962 and the Indonesian Occupation of East Timor of 1974 to 1999. Kilcullen argues that counter-insurgency operations, whether successful or not, cause the diffusion of political power from central to local leaders and that populations are the major actors in insurgency and counter-insurgency dynamics.

== Australian Army ==
Kilcullen was commissioned as a lieutenant in the Australian Army and served in a number of operational, strategic, command, and staff positions in the Royal Australian Infantry Corps and Australian Defence Force. He served in several counter-insurgency and peacekeeping operations in East Timor, Bougainville, and the Middle East.

Kilcullen attained the rank of lieutenant colonel in the Australian Army and served as a staff officer in the Australian Defence Force Headquarters. In 2004, he became a senior analyst in the Australian Office of National Assessments, where he served on the writing team for the Australian Government's 2004 Terrorism White Paper, "Transnational Terrorism: The Threat to Australia."

He left active duty in 2005 and is commissioned as a lieutenant colonel in the Australian Army Reserve.

== Career in the United States ==
Kilcullen was seconded to the United States Department of Defense in 2004, where he wrote the counter-terrorism strategy for the Quadrennial Defense Review that appeared in 2006. After going to reserve status in the Australian Army, Kilcullen worked for the United States Department of State in 2005 and 2006, serving as the Chief Strategist in the Office of the Coordinator for Counterterrorism. He worked in the field in Pakistan, Afghanistan, Iraq, the Horn of Africa and Southeast Asia. He helped design and implement the Regional Strategic Initiative.

Kilcullen helped write the United States Army's Field Manual 3-24, Counterinsurgency, published in December 2006. He also wrote an appendix, entitled "A Guide to Action."

In early 2007, Kilcullen became a member of a small group of civilian and military experts, including Colonel H. R. McMaster, who worked on the personal staff of General David Petraeus, the Commander of the Multi-National Force – Iraq. There, Kilcullen served as the Senior Counterinsurgency Advisor until 2008 and was responsible for planning and executing counterinsurgency strategy and operations. He was the principal architect of the Joint Campaign Plan which guided the Iraq War 2007 Troop Surge.

He has also served as the Special Advisor for Counterinsurgency to Secretary of State Condoleezza Rice in 2007 and 2008.

Kilcullen was a member of the White House 2008 Review of Afghanistan and Pakistan Strategy. From 2009 to 2010, he was the counterinsurgency adviser to NATO and the International Security Assistance Force in Afghanistan. Kilcullen has also been an adviser to the British Government, the Australian Government, and to several private sector institutions and companies.

He was a senior fellow and a member of the advisory board of the Center for a New American Security. He was a partner at the Crumpton Group, but left "over a matter of principle." He has also been an adjunct professor of Security Studies at the Johns Hopkins School of Advanced International Studies.

Kilcullen founded Caerus Associates, LLC in 2010. Caerus is a Washington, D.C.–based strategic and design consultancy firm that specialises in working in complex and frontier environments. Kilcullen is an Advisory Board Member of Spirit of America, a 501(c)(3) organization that supports the safety and success of Americans serving abroad and the local people and partners they seek to help.

== Contributions to counter-insurgency ==
=== Complex Warfighting ===
In 2004, Kilcullen wrote Complex Warfighting, which became the basis of the Australian Army's Future Land Operating Concept, approved the next year. It identifies an operating environment heavily influenced by globalisation and the United States' conventional military dominance. The concept claims that future conflicts will feature asymmetric threats requiring land forces to be flexible, able to deploy quickly, and operate in urban terrain. The paper calls for "modular, highly educated and skilled forces with a capacity for network-enabled operations, optimised for close combat in combined arms teams. These teams will be small, semi-autonomous, and highly networked, incorporating traditional elements of the combined arms team as well as non-traditional elements such as civil affairs, intelligence, and psychological warfare capabilities. They will have a capacity for protracted independent operations within a joint interagency framework." While not strictly limited to counter-insurgency, it stated that counter-insurgency and other non-traditional actions were going to compose a greater part of warfare in the 21st century.

=== "Countering Global Insurgency" ===
"Countering Global Insurgency" proposed a new strategic approach to the war on terrorism. It was first published in Small Wars Journal in 2004 and then a shorter version appeared in the Journal of Strategic Studies in 2005. The paper argues that al-Qaeda is best understood as a "global Islamic insurgency" that seeks to promote its takfiri version of Islam and increase its role in the world order. Thus, counter-insurgency strategies and tactics need updating to deal with a globalised movement like al-Qaeda, especially increasing participation and cooperation of many states' intelligence and police agencies.

=== "Counterinsurgency Redux" ===
Kilcullen's 2006 paper "Counterinsurgency Redux" questions the relevance of classical counterinsurgency theory to modern conflict. It argues from field evidence gathered in Iraq, Afghanistan, Pakistan, and the Horn of Africa that:

[T]oday's insurgencies differ significantly from those of the 1960s. Insurgents may not be seeking to overthrow the state, have no coherent strategy, or pursue a faith-based approach difficult to counter traditional methods. There may be numerous competing insurgencies in one theater, meaning that the counterinsurgent must control the overall environment rather than defeat a specific enemy. Individuals' actions and the propaganda effect of a subjective "single narrative" may far outweigh practical progress, rendering counterinsurgency even more non-linear and unpredictable than before. The counterinsurgent, not the insurgent, may initiate the conflict and represent the forces of revolutionary change. The economic relationship between insurgents and the population may be diametrically opposed to classical theory. And insurgent tactics, based on exploiting the propaganda effects of urban bombing, may invalidate some classical tactics and render others, like patrolling, counterproductive under some circumstances. Thus, field evidence suggests, classical theory is necessary but not sufficient for success against contemporary insurgencies

=== "Twenty-Eight Articles" ===
Kilcullen's paper "Twenty-Eight Articles" is a practical guide for junior officers and non-commissioned officers engaged in counter-insurgency operations in Afghanistan and Iraq. The paper's publication history is an illustration of new methods of knowledge propagation in the military-professional community. It first appeared as an e-mail that was widely circulated informally among U.S. Army and Marine officers in April 2006, and was subsequently published in Military Review in May 2006. Later versions of it were published in IoSphere and the Marine Corps Gazette, and it has been translated into Arabic, Russian, Pashtu and Spanish. It was later formalised as Appendix A to FM 3-24, the US military's counterinsurgency doctrine, and is in use by the US, Australian, British, Canadian, Dutch, Iraqi and Afghan armies as a training document.

=== Conflict ethnography ===
Kilcullen has argued in most of his works for a deeper cultural understanding of the conflict environment, an approach he has called conflict ethnography: "a deep, situation-specific understanding of the human, social and cultural dimensions of a conflict, understood not by analogy with some other conflict, but in its own terms." In the same essay, "Religion and Insurgency," published in May 2007 on the Small Wars Journal, he expanded this view:

The bottom line is that no handbook relieves a professional counterinsurgent from the personal obligation to study, internalize and interpret the physical, human, informational and ideological setting in which the conflict takes place. Conflict ethnography is key; to borrow a literary term, there is no substitute for a "close reading" of the environment. But it is a reading that resides in no book, but around you; in the terrain, the people, their social and cultural institutions, the way they act and think. You have to be a participant-observer. And the key is to see beyond the surface differences between our societies and these environments (of which religious orientation is one key element) to the deeper social and cultural drivers of conflict, drivers that locals would understand on their own terms.

=== Counterinsurgency ===
In 2010, Kilcullen brought together his writings in his book Counterinsurgency and developed his understanding of counterinsurgency to address radical Islam's globalised threat. He argues that successful counterinsurgency is about out-governing the enemy and winning the adaptation battle to provide integrated measures to defeat insurgent tactics through political, administrative, military, economic, psychological, and informational means.

== Positions on American policy ==
=== Iraq War ===
In an interview with Spencer Ackerman of the Washington Independent in 2008, Kilcullen called the decision to invade Iraq "fucking stupid" and suggested that if policy-makers apply his manual's lessons, similar wars can be avoided in the future. "The biggest stupid idea," Kilcullen said, "was to invade Iraq in the first place." Kilcullen didn't deny saying it, but rather that "I can categorically state that the word 'fucking' was said off the record". Kilcullen explained his comment the next day:

[I]n my view, the decision to invade Iraq in 2003 was an extremely serious strategic error. But the task of the moment is not to cry over spilt milk, rather to help clean it up: a task in which the surge, the comprehensive counterinsurgency approach, and our troops on the ground are admirably succeeding.

...

The question of whether we were right to invade Iraq is a fascinating debate for historians and politicians, and a valid issue for the American people to consider in an election year. As it happens, I think it was a mistake. But that is not my key concern. The issue for practitioners in the field is not to second-guess a decision from six years ago, but to get on with the job at hand which, I believe, is what both Americans and Iraqis expect of us. In that respect, the new strategy and tactics implemented in 2007, which relied for their effectiveness on the Surge's extra troop numbers, ARE succeeding and need to be supported.

In his book Blood Year, published in 2016, Kilcullen makes very clear his view that "there undeniably would be no Isis if we had not invaded Iraq." In a March 2016 interview on the UK's Channel 4 News, he went on to say:

We now face not one but two global terrorist organisations in an environment that’s much less stable and much more fragmented than it was in 2001.

=== Criticizing American policy ===
On 6 March 2009, Kilcullen published a piece on Small Wars Journal titled "Accidental Guerrilla: Read Before Burning." The piece responded to Andrew Bacevich's review of Kilcullen's book, The Accidental Guerilla: Fighting Small Wars in the Midst of a Big One, and also addressed his criticisms of American administrations. Kilcullen wrote:

[M]y views have been on the public record for years, since well before I came to work for the government and since before I served in the field in Iraq, Afghanistan and Pakistan. They hired me anyway. And secondly, surprising as it may be, the last administration – just like the present administration – was big enough, open enough and intellectually honest enough to tolerate and, indeed, welcome constructive criticism and genuine attempts to fix policy problems. I never found that it needed much moral courage to be honest about my opinions – non-partisan honesty was exactly what Secretary Rice wanted from me, and she told me that more than once. The ability to tolerate and integrate different opinions, and thus to self-correct, is one of the foremost strengths of our form of government, and I suspect this is true of all administrations, though perhaps it is true of some more than others.

=== Drone use ===
Kilcullen argues that targeted killings with drone strikes in Afghanistan and Pakistan is a mistake. in 2009 he said: "These strikes are totally counter-productive. It is a strategic error to personalise the conflict in this way, it’ll strengthen the enemy and weaken our friends. How can one expect the civilian population to support us if we kill their families and destroy their homes."

== Publications and testimony ==
- Kilcullen, David J. (2000). The political consequences of military operations in Indonesia 1945-99 (Thesis). Australian Defence Forces Academy. doi:10.26190/unsworks/18047. hdl:1959.4/38709.
- "Rethinking the Basis of Infantry Close Combat" (PDF). Australian Army Journal. I (1): 29–40. June 2003. Archived from the original (PDF) on 15 April 2019.
- "Complex Warfighting" (PDF). Australian Army Future Land Operational Concept (FLOC). 7 April 2004. Archived from the original (PDF) on 18 June 2009.
- "Countering global insurgency" (PDF). Small Wars Journal. 30 November 2004. Longer draft version of journal article.
- Kilcullen, David J. (2005). "Countering global insurgency". Journal of Strategic Studies. 28 (4): 597–617. doi:10.1080/01402390500300956. S2CID 154552216. Archived from the original on 25 September 2013.
- "Twenty-Eight Articles: Fundamentals of Company-level Counterinsurgency" (PDF). Military Review. 83 (3): 103–108. May–June 2006. Archived from the original (PDF) on 19 October 2016. Different version
- Kilcullen, David (Winter 2006–2007). "Counterinsurgency Redux" (PDF). Survival. 48 (4): 111–130. doi:10.1080/00396330601062790. S2CID 153360947. Archived from the original (PDF) on 14 June 2007.
- "New Paradigms for 21st Century Conflict". Countering the Terrorist Mentality. U.S. Department of State. May 2007.
- "Counterinsurgency and Irregular Warfare: Issues and Lessons Learned" (PDF). Terrorism, Unconventional Threats and Capabilities Subcommittee of the Committee on Armed Services, House of Representatives. 7 May 2009.
- "Balanced Response: A National Security Strategy for the Protracted Struggle Against Extremism" ( (PDF)). Beyond Bullets: Strategies for Countering Violent Extremism. Center for a New American Security. 8 June 2009. pp. 39–59. Archived from the original on 23 January 2013.
- "Testimony Before the Senate Foreign Relations Committee Hearings on Afghanistan" (PDF). U.S. Senate Foreign Relations Committee. 27 July 2010. Video
- "Testimony Before the U.S. Senate Foreign Relations Committee" (PDF). U.S. Senate Foreign Relations Committee. 11 May 2011. Video
- Williams, Kenneth, ed. (2011). "State Versus Non-State Interventions in Fragile States". Rethinking: A Middle East in Transition. Middle East Institute. pp. 65–69. ISBN 9780160901751.
- "Selected Publications by Dr. David Kilcullen". Center for a New American Security. Archived from the original on 7 February 2013.
- "Dave Kilcullen author index page". Small Wars Journal.
- Kilcullen, David (2015). Blood Year: Terror and the Islamic State. Black. ISBN 978-1-86395-732-8.

=== Books ===
- The Accidental Guerrilla: Fighting Small Wars in the Midst of a Big One. New York: Oxford University Press. 2009. ISBN 978-0-19-536834-5.
- Counterinsurgency. New York: Oxford University Press. 2010. ISBN 978-0-19-973748-2.
- Out of the Mountains: The Coming Age of the Urban Guerrilla. New York: Oxford University Press. 2013. ISBN 978-0-19-973750-5.
- Blood Year: The Unraveling of Western Counterterrorism. New York: Oxford University Press. 2016. ISBN 978-0-19-0600549.
- The Dragons and the Snakes: How the Rest Learned to Fight the West. London: Hurst. 2020. ISBN 978-1-78-7380981.

== See also ==
- Counter-insurgency
- Counter-terrorism
- Human Terrain System
- Iraq War troop surge of 2007
