= In the Arena =

Television series

- Also known as: Parker Spitzer (October 4, 2010 — February 25, 2011)
- Created by: Eliot Spitzer; Kathleen Parker
- Presented by: Eliot Spitzer (October 4, 2010 — July 6, 2011); Kathleen Parker (October 4, 2010 — February 25, 2011); E. D. Hill (February 28, 2011 — August 5, 2011); Will Cain (February 28, 2011 — August 5, 2011)
- Country of origin: United States

Production
- Running time: 60 minutes

Original release
- Network: CNN
- Release: October 4, 2010 – August 5, 2011

In the Arena is an American one-hour show on CNN that premiered October 4, 2010 as Parker Spitzer and was hosted by former New York Democratic governor Eliot Spitzer and Pulitzer Prize-winning political columnist Kathleen Parker. It was broadcast weeknights in prime time at 8 p.m. ET, replacing Campbell Brown in the same time slot. The show received consistently low ratings and there were reports of backstage fighting between Spitzer and Parker. On February 25, 2011, CNN announced that Parker had parted ways with the show to continue her work on her syndicated column but would continue to contribute to CNN. Spitzer remained on the show and the title was changed to In the Arena effective February 28. The show was canceled by CNN on July 6, 2011. The cancellation was effective August 8, 2011, when CNN went on to broadcast its flagship nightly news program AC360, anchored by Anderson Cooper, live at 8 pm and re-air in the time slot of 10 pm.

== Program details ==
=== Format and topics ===
In an interview published by The Hollywood Reporter, newly appointed CNN President Ken Jautz said the network was relying heavily on Parker Spitzer and on Piers Morgan replacing Larry King Live to raise ratings with "livelier and more engaging" programming. When asked what kind of ratings improvement he would consider a success, Jautz simply replied, "Higher." On the show's main news blog, it states that it has the goal of facilitating a "dynamic exchange of opinions, ideas and analyses ... on the most important, compelling and amusing stories of the day".

Spitzer has remarked, "We'll talk about movies sometimes, sports, we'll have everything under the sun, but we are clearly a political show." A recurring segment in the program is a challenge to legislators called "Name Your Cuts", about the U.S. national debt.

=== Ratings and reviews ===
The show premiered to poor ratings, finishing fourth place among cable news programs in its time slot. Among people from ages to 25 to 54, the show garnered 118,000 viewers compared to 722,000 for The O'Reilly Factor. Spitzer remarked in response,

It takes time for most successful shows to build an audience. There will be interest from the beginning, and we hope to entice some of those people to stick around. We also know these things do not happen overnight.

Parker Spitzer arguably has not helped CNN's prime time since, leaving the network with its worst prime-time ratings in 10 years. On December 7, The New York Times stated that "at the two-month mark, the ratings for CNN's latest experiment are stagnant." Parker has described the show's relationship to viewers as "absolutely a work in progress".

Critical reaction has largely been negative. After the show's debut episode, The Huffington Post summarized that "[b]y and large, television critics from around the country were scathing in their assessment". Reviewers such as those from The New York Times and The Los Angeles Times have criticized the show for being one-sided, with Spitzer dominating over the more demure and meekly spoken Parker. Critics such as James Poniewozik writing for Time have panned the sometimes flirty nature of the back-and-forth between Parker and Spitzer.

Dennis Rodman and Andrew Jenks talk, along with other guests, on the show on November 19, 2010.

When Washington Examiner columnist Richard Viguerie appeared on the show, he accused it of having a left-of-center bias, saying to Parker:

Kathleen, all due respect, in the last 10 days or so, I have been watching this show, I would change vanilla to more distilled water. I've not heard you say, an ideological thought that disagrees with Eliot ... Kathleen, how many times do you see conservatives on CNN who are articulate and will challenge an Eliot Spitzer?

In response, Parker has said, "No matter how great we are or how good a job we do, critics are going to be critics".

During a stretch in which Spitzer hosted the show solo and Parker took a leave of absence because of a lung infection, ratings doubled without Parker compared to episodes with her.

=== Backstage tensions ===
The show has been dogged by reports of backstage tensions between Spitzer and Parker. The Page Six gossip column in The New York Post stated in early November that Parker had stormed off the set. When asked about the reports, Parker said, "I don't storm. I saunter."

=== Parker's departure ===
On Friday, February 25, 2011, CNN announced that Parker would depart from Parker Spitzer, with Spitzer continuing to host the program, under the new name In the Arena, effective Monday, February 28, 2011. Parker's last words, "On a personal note, today is my last day on the show, and I just want to thank you, the viewers, for tuning in. I look forward to seeing you down the road."

=== Cancellation of the show ===
On July 6, 2011, CNN announced the cancellation of In the Arena. The same time slot would be filled by Anderson Cooper's show Anderson Cooper 360°, which will also continue in a rerun in its current slot; no new show will replace it. The reason for the change in the evening lineup was to showcase anchors who were "experienced reporters in covering stories that span the globe," as stated by CNN's executive vice president.

Spitzer would later emerge as the host of Viewpoint on Current TV.
