= Lou Dobbs =

American television host (1945–2024)

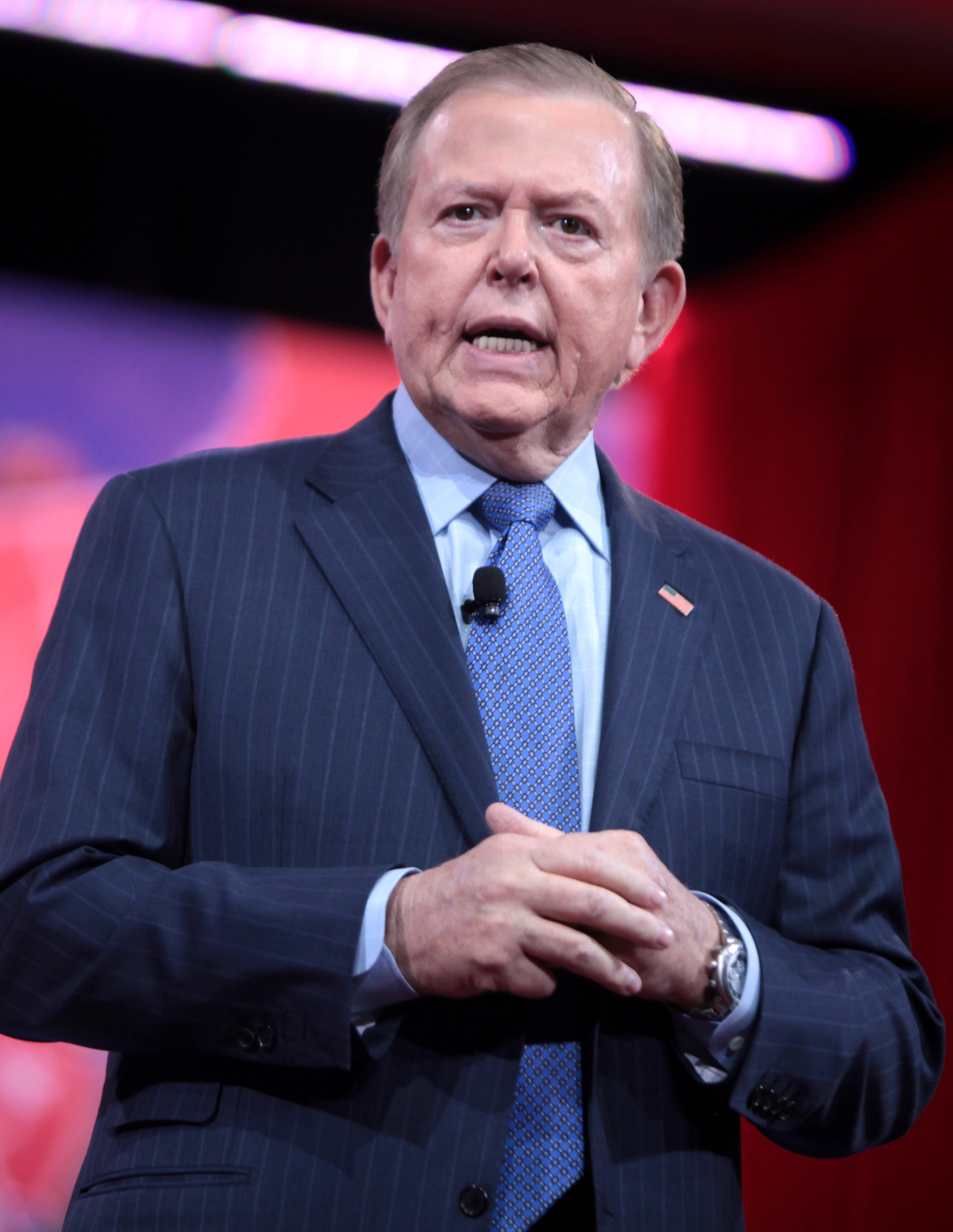
- Dobbs at CPAC in 2015
- Born: Louis Carl Dobbs; September 24, 1945; Childress, Texas, U.S.
- Died: July 18, 2024 (aged 78); West Palm Beach, Florida, U.S.
- Education: Harvard University (BA) University of Idaho College of Law
- Occupations: Author; news anchor; managing editor; talk radio host
- Political party: Republican (until 2001); Independent (2001–2024)
- Movement: Birtherism; Tea Party movement
- Spouse: Debi Lee Roth-Segura
- Children: 4
- Website: loudobbs.com

Louis Carl Dobbs (September 24, 1945 – July 18, 2024) was an American conservative author, political commentator, and television host who presented Moneyline (later Lou Dobbs Tonight) from 1980 to 2009 and 2011 to 2021. From 2021 until his death, he hosted The Great America Show on iHeartRadio and loudobbs.com.

Dobbs started working with CNN at its inception in 1980, serving as a reporter and network vice president. On the air, he served as host and managing editor of the network's business program, Moneyline, which premiered in 1980. Dobbs resigned from CNN in 1999 but rejoined the network in 2001. The show was renamed Lou Dobbs Tonight in 2003. He resigned once again in November 2009. He was the former talk radio host of Lou Dobbs Radio. From 2011, he hosted Lou Dobbs Tonight on the Fox Business Network until the network cancelled it in February 2021.

Dobbs was an early promoter of birtherism, the unfounded accusation that former U.S. President Barack Obama is not a natural-born U.S. citizen. He was known for anti-illegal immigration views, as well as for opposition to NAFTA and other trade deals. A staunch supporter of Donald Trump, he infused his show with pro-Trump coverage. He was one of three Fox Corporation program hosts named in a $2.7 billion defamation lawsuit by Smartmatic relating to conspiracy theories used in attempts to overturn the 2020 United States presidential election. Dobbs was among the hosts named in the Dominion Voting Systems v. Fox News Network defamation lawsuit for broadcasting false statements about the plaintiff company's voting machines that Fox News settled for $787.5 million and required Fox News to acknowledge that the broadcast statements were false.

== Early life and education ==
Louis Carl Dobbs was born September 24, 1945, in Childress, Texas. He was the son of Frank Dobbs, a co-owner of a propane business, and Lydia Mae (née Hensley), a bookkeeper. When Dobbs was twelve, his father's propane business failed and the family moved to Rupert, Idaho. Although accepted at the University of Idaho and Idaho State University, he was persuaded by the staff at Minico High School to apply to Harvard University, where he was accepted and graduated in 1967 with a Bachelor of Arts degree in economics.

== Career ==
After college, Dobbs worked for federal anti-poverty programs in Boston and Washington, D.C., then returned to Idaho. He briefly attended the University of Idaho College of Law in Moscow, and then worked as a cash-management specialist for Union Bank of California in Los Angeles. He married his high school sweetheart in 1969, and in 1970 their first son was born. Dobbs moved to Yuma, Arizona, and got a job as a police and fire reporter for KBLU. By the mid-1970s, he was a television anchor and reporter in Phoenix, and he later joined Seattle's KING-TV. In 1979, he was contacted by a recruiter for Ted Turner, who was in the process of forming CNN.

=== CNN ===
Dobbs joined CNN when it launched in 1980, serving as its chief economics correspondent and as host of the business news program Moneyline on CNN. Dobbs also served as a corporate executive for CNN, as its executive vice president and as a member of CNN's executive committee.

Dobbs was president of CNNfn (CNN financial news) and anchored the program Business Unusual. His ratings were typically triple that of his former protégé, Maria Bartiromo. Howard Kurtz, in his book on business journalism of the era, wrote that Dobbs "could be arrogant and abrasive" and was controversial within CNN. In 1992, Dobbs admitted to receiving more than $15,000 to act as a spokesman from Shearson Lehman Brothers, PaineWebber, and the Philadelphia Stock Exchange, making promotional videos; he was reprimanded by the network for the conflict of interest and expressed regret in a memo to staff.

Dobbs nearly left the network in 1997 over a clash on CNNfn's direction; he ultimately convinced Turner to expand CNNfn from 14 hours per day to 18 hours per day, with a commitment to further increase it to 24 hours per day.

=== Departure and founding of Space.com ===
Dobbs repeatedly clashed with Rick Kaplan, who became president of CNN in 1997. Dobbs said Kaplan, a friend of then president Bill Clinton, was "clearly partisan" and "was pushing Clinton stories", while Kaplan said Dobbs was "a very difficult person to work with."

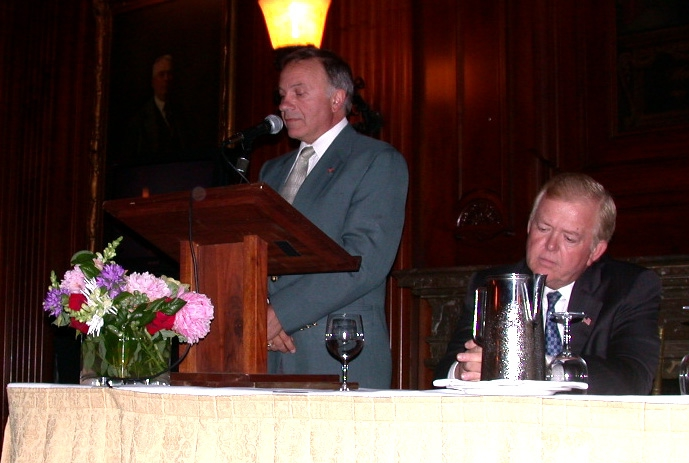
Dobbs with then-U.S. Representative Tom Tancredo in 2004

On April 20, 1999, CNN was covering Clinton's speech in Littleton, Colorado, following the Columbine High School massacre. Dobbs ordered the producer to cut away from the speech and return to broadcast Moneyline. Dobbs was countermanded by Kaplan, who ordered CNN to return to the speech. Kaplan later said, "Tell me what journalistic reason there was not to cover the president at Columbine soon after the shootings? Everyone else was doing it". Dobbs announced on the air that "CNN President Rick Kaplan wants us to return to Littleton." A few days later, Dobbs announced that he was leaving the network to start Space.com, a website devoted to astronautical news. Dobbs was subsequently replaced as host of Moneyline by Willow Bay and Stuart Varney.

=== Space.com ===
Dobbs announced that he was leaving CNN to start up the site Space.com in July 1999. Dobbs was one of the primary shareholders in that company and later that year became Space.com's chief executive officer. Dobbs returned to CNN in 2001.

=== Return to CNN ===
Kaplan left CNN in August 2000, and Dobbs returned the following year, at the behest of his friend and CNN founder Ted Turner, becoming host and managing editor of the new and initially more general news program Lou Dobbs Reporting, which later became CNN News Sunday Morning. He also regained the helm of the newly renamed Lou Dobbs Moneyline (which became Lou Dobbs Tonight in June 2003).

According to The Washington Post, Dobbs started to increasingly focus on the alleged dangers of illegal immigration after returning to CNN. Dobbs became a self-described populist after his return to CNN, and criticized the "greed" of big corporations and their opposition to raising the minimum wage.

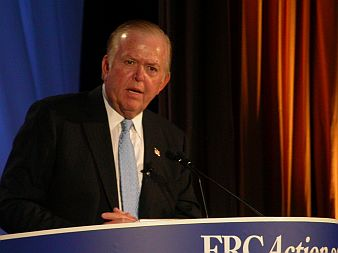
Dobbs in 2008

=== Exit from CNN ===
In July 2009, controversy around Dobbs began when he was the only mainstream news anchor to give airtime to the birther theory that Barack Obama was not born in the United States. Several media watch groups, including Media Matters and the Southern Poverty Law Center, criticized Dobbs for his reporting. The controversy eventually caused CNN President Jon Klein to rein Dobbs in via an internal memorandum. In September, advocates challenged Dobbs for appearing at a conference organized by the pro-border security group Federation for American Immigration Reform. Multiple campaigns were launched, including "Drop Dobbs" (NDN, Media Matters). The campaigns also attacked CNN for alleged hypocrisy towards Latinos, citing CNN's Latino in America special as incompatible with their continued support of Dobbs. The campaigns generated considerable anti-Dobbs press.

On the November 11, 2009, edition of his nightly broadcast Lou Dobbs Tonight, Dobbs announced his immediate departure from CNN, ending a nearly thirty-year career at the network, citing plans to "pursue new opportunities." CNN President Jon Klein said that Dobbs's departure was not a result of organized opposition to Dobbs's viewpoints.

Dobbs was reportedly paid $8 million in severance pay when he left CNN.

After Dobbs left CNN in 2009, he did not rule out the possibility of running for President of the United States in 2012, saying the final decision would rest with his wife. Former Senator Dean Barkley promoted Dobbs as a potential presidential candidate with the Independence Party (formerly called the Reform Party).

=== Radio ===
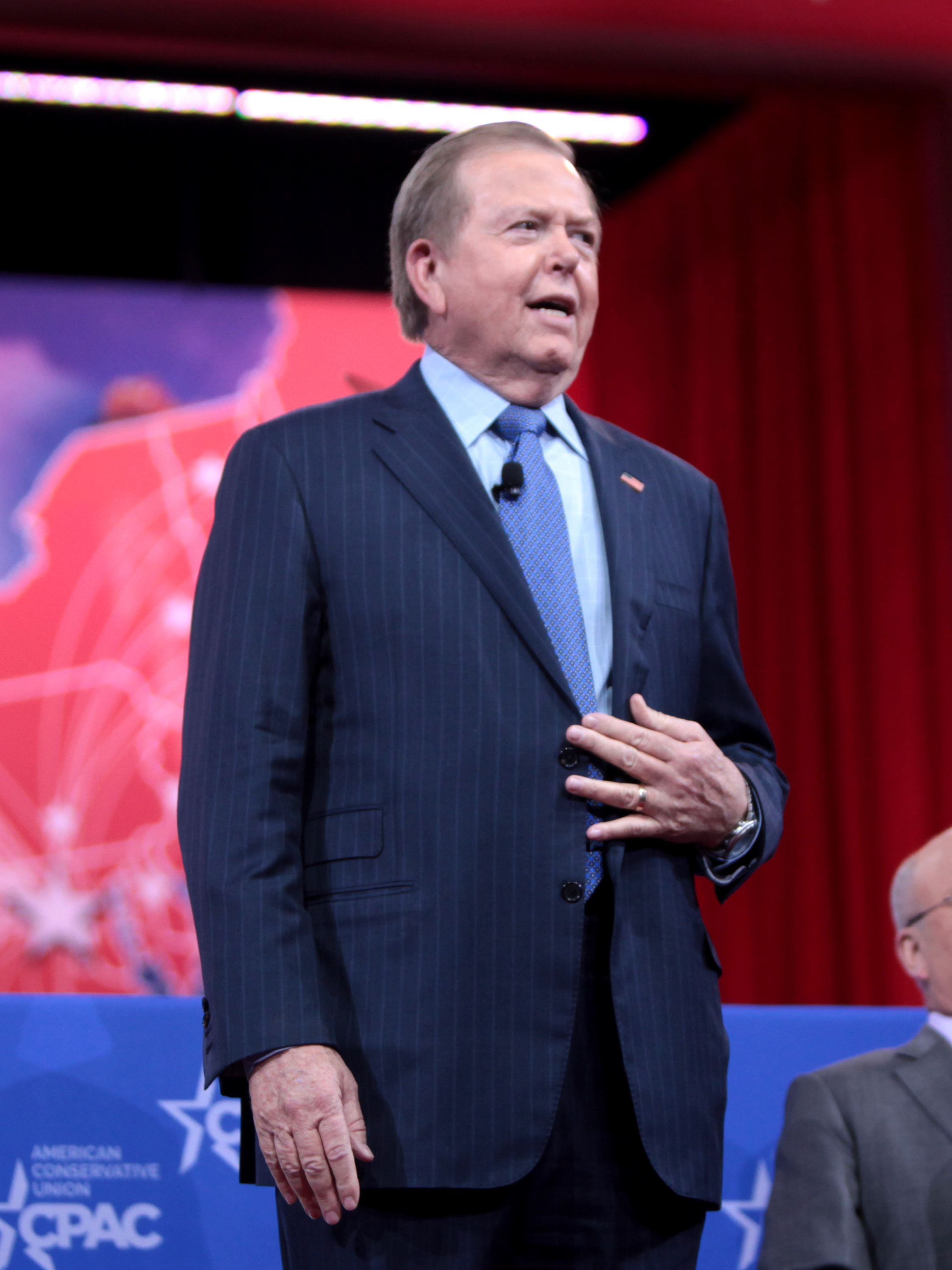
Dobbs at CPAC in 2015

From 2008 to 2012, Dobbs hosted Lou Dobbs Radio on United Stations Radio Networks. The three-hour daily show had affiliates in several major markets, including its flagship station (WOR) in New York City. The show was guest-centered and featured political discussion and listener calls.

Dobbs was among the hosts who tried out for the position vacated by the cancellation of Imus in the Morning on WFAN, a position that was eventually filled by Boomer and Carton in the Morning.

Dobbs was also a regular columnist in Money magazine, U.S. News & World Report, and the New York Daily News.

=== Fox Business Network ===
On November 10, 2010, Fox Business Network announced that Dobbs would host a show on the channel. The network announced on March 3, 2011, the start date, show title, and time slot of Dobbs's new show. Entitled Lou Dobbs Tonight, the program debuted on March 14, 2011.

On February 4, 2021, voting machine company Smartmatic filed a $2.7 billion defamation suit against multiple parties, including Dobbs and two other Fox Corporation program hosts, asserting they had promoted conspiracy theories alleging the company and its competitor Dominion Voting Systems had participated in an international conspiracy to rig the 2020 presidential election against Donald Trump. The three programs had each run a video retraction weeks earlier, after receiving a demand letter from Smartmatic, though neither Dobbs nor the other hosts personally issued retractions.

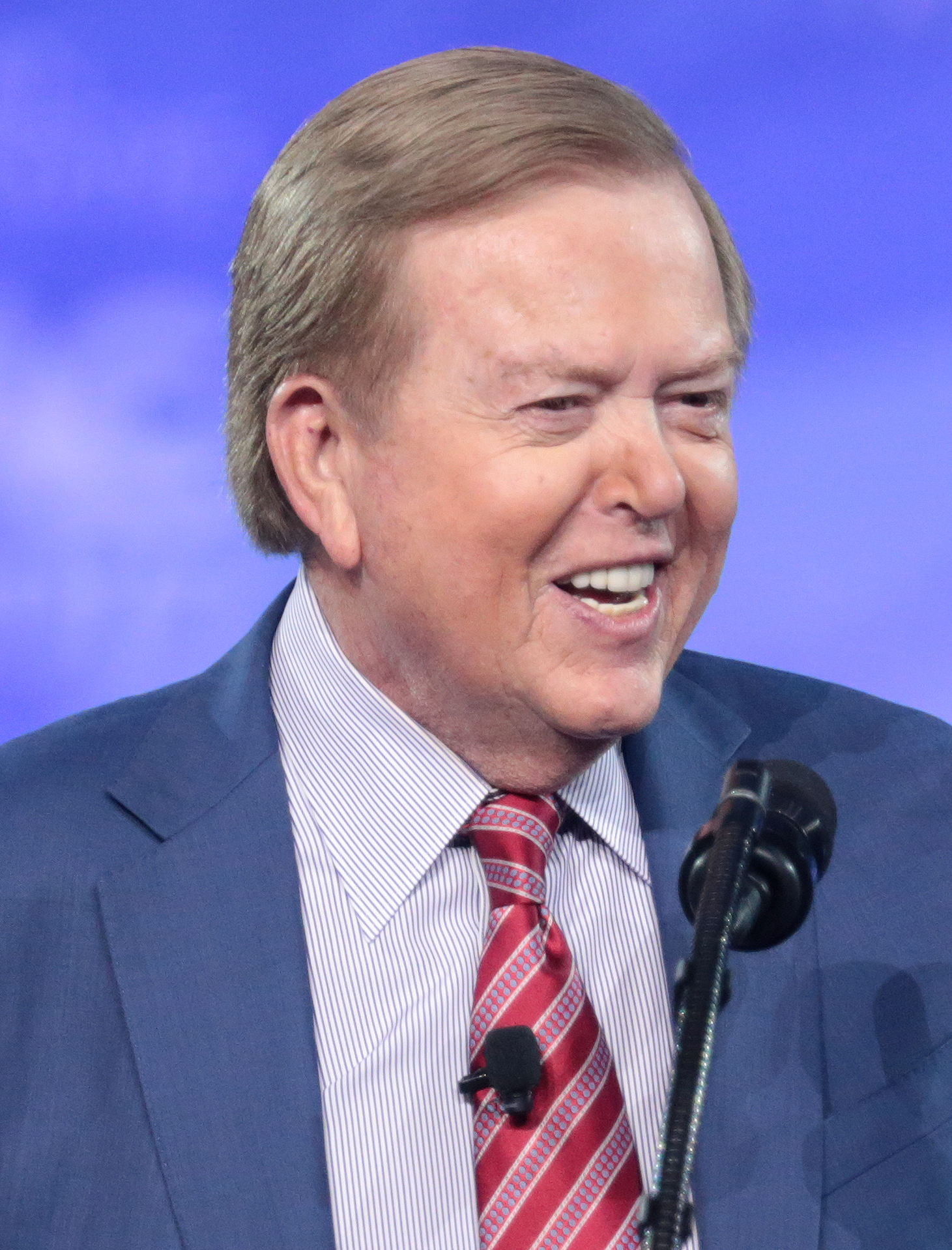
Dobbs at CPAC in 2017

Venezuelan businessman Majed Khalil sued Dobbs, Fox News and Sidney Powell for $250 million in December 2021, alleging they had falsely implicated him in rigging Dominion and Smartmatic machines. Dobbs and Fox News reached a confidential settlement with Khalil in April 2023.

Fox News canceled Dobbs' show on February 5, 2021. The Los Angeles Times reported the decision had been under consideration before the Smartmatic legal issues arose. Brian Stelter and Oliver Darcy of CNN Business claimed that, despite being the highest-rated Fox Business Network program, it was a loss leader because many advertisers did not want to be associated with the content.

=== Other appearances ===
Since 2009, Dobbs had made regular appearances to discuss issues on other news network programs including CNBC's The Kudlow Report and Fox News Channel's The O'Reilly Factor. On October 5, 2010, Dobbs made a guest appearance on an episode of The Good Wife, entitled "Double Jeopardy", in which he plays a client in search of a new law firm to represent his legal interests.

== Political views ==
Dobbs was known for his illegal-immigration views, warnings about Islamist terrorism, and his opposition to outsourcing. He was also known for his pro-Trump coverage.

=== China ===
In December 2018, Dobbs suggested that the United States should start a war with China because of hacking by Chinese state actors. He compared hacking by the People's Liberation Army of China to the attack by the Japanese military on Pearl Harbor in 1941.

=== Birtherism ===
In 2009, Dobbs promoted the false claim that Barack Obama was not born in the United States. His repeated promotion of discredited "birther" conspiracies even though CNN itself considered it a "discredited rumor", revived a topic that had largely disappeared from the media spotlight after the 2008 presidential campaign. The Southern Poverty Law Center denounced Dobbs' on-air statements as "racist" and "defamatory" and Media Matters ran ads critical of Dobbs and of CNN. Jon Stewart mocked Dobbs on the satirical Comedy Central television series The Daily Show. The Associated Press said that Dobbs had "become a publicity nightmare for CNN, embarrassed his boss and hosted a show that seemed to contradict the network's 'no bias' brand".

=== Environment ===
Dobbs claimed that the scientific consensus on climate change was a hoax. Dobbs had asserted that scientists warned of global cooling in the 1970s, though that was a distinctly minority view. He likened the Obama administration's EPA to the Soviet bureaucracy.

=== Immigration ===
Dobbs supported limiting mass immigration. Dobbs was strongly opposed to both illegal immigration and foreign worker programs as the H-1B visa program and guest-worker programs. In a 2006 article, Dobbs expressed frustration at failed legislation to build a southern "border fence to stop the flow of illegal aliens and drugs across our borders." He argued that the "true victims of corporate America's lust for cheap labor" were "American working men and women, taxpayers all." During efforts to implement comprehensive immigration reform during the Bush administration in 2007, Dobbs devoted more than a quarter of all of his airtime during a three-month period to the subject of immigration, and covered it negatively.

Dobbs's show made factually incorrect claims, such as the one that illegal immigrants were responsible for bringing 7,000 new cases of leprosy to the United States in a three-year period, where the actual timeframe was over the last thirty years. In addressing the leprosy issue, Dobbs in May 2007 compared his critics on the left and right to "commies" and "fascists, respectively." Dobbs also falsely claimed that "illegal aliens" were a third of the federal prison population in the United States.

Dobbs criticized local officials for their approach to border security. In October 2007 he labeled then-New York Governor Eliot Spitzer an "idiot" for advocating the issuance of driver's licenses to illegal immigrants. Hillary Clinton labeled Dobbs's illegal immigration segments as having "all that hot air."

In a November 2009 interview with Telemundo, Dobbs said that the U.S. needed a "rational, effective humane policy" for immigration that included enhanced border security and also "the ability to legalize illegal immigrants on certain conditions."

In October 2010, The Nation published the results of a yearlong investigation detailing undocumented workers who had worked on Dobbs's personal properties. The labor involved upkeep of Dobbs's multimillion-dollar estates in New Jersey and Florida, including the horses belonging to his daughter, Hillary, a champion show jumper. The article featured interviews with five immigrants who had worked without papers on Dobbs's properties. Dobbs denied ever employing illegal labor and called the allegations "a political assault."

In November 2018, Dobbs falsely claimed that "many" undocumented immigrants voted in the 2018 mid-term elections and that they had an "immense impact."

Dobbs's critics, including columnist James K. Glassman, author of Dow 36,000 and member of the American Enterprise Institute think tank, accused him of inciting xenophobia. Others accused him of Hispanophobia, a charge he denied and one which he said offends him deeply, as his wife Debi Segura is a Mexican American.

After President Donald Trump stated in March 2019 that he supported legal immigration "in the largest numbers ever," Dobbs lamented that Trump was advancing "the interests of the global elite ahead of our citizens," adding, "the White House has simply lost its way."

=== Support for Trump ===
Dobbs's fawning coverage of the first Trump presidency was described as sycophantic. Fox News president Jay Wallace said in a September 2020 private message to a colleague that "the North Koreans do a more nuanced show" than Dobbs. Dobbs opened a November 2017 interview with Trump with "You have accomplished so much", and later said to Trump that he was "one of the most loved and respected" presidents "in history". The New York Times described the interview as a love-fest and "courtier-like session", as Dobbs "didn't so much ask questions as open his mouth and let rose petals fall out". During Trump's presidency, Dobbs was described as a "close informal adviser to President Donald Trump". Trump repeatedly called Dobbs to get his views on various policy issues.

Dobbs promoted "Deep State" conspiracy theories. In January 2018, he called for a "war" on what he called the "deep state" of FBI and the Department of Justice, whom he claimed were clandestinely working to bring down the Trump presidency. In June 2018, Dobbs promoted a conspiracy which originated on Reddit and the far-right conspiracy website Gateway Pundit that "the FBI may have initiated a number of spies" into Trump's 2016 campaign. Trump retweeted Dobbs's assertion and praised Dobbs for a "great interview". In July 2018, Dobbs said that Special Counsel Robert Mueller was on a "jihad" against Trump, and accused him of seeking to "subvert" and "overthrow" Trump's presidency. In December 2018, Dobbs called the FBI "a legion of evildoers" and "politically corrupt." That same month, he said that the judge overseeing Michael Flynn's sentencing sounded as if he was part of Mueller's "witch hunt".

In July 2018, Dobbs defended the Trump administration's decision to ban a CNN reporter from a press event. Multiple Fox colleagues, including Fox News President Jay Wallace, had shown solidarity with CNN and called on the White House to rescind the ban. His defense led to charges of hypocrisy: in 2012, when a Daily Caller reporter was criticized by the White House for shouting out a question during an address by Obama, Dobbs defended the reporter, saying "What is rude is a president not speaking to the American people and taking the questions of the White House press". CNN's Jake Tapper suggested that Dobbs was hypocritical.

In August 2018, Dobbs ran a segment pushing unsubstantiated claims that Google was biased against Trump and that Google was promoting anti-Trump stories. Following Dobbs's segment, Trump tweeted that Google was suppressing conservatives and tasked economic adviser Larry Kudlow to look into regulating Google.

In September 2018, after Trump inaccurately claimed that the official death count from Hurricane Maria in Puerto Rico was fabricated by Democrats, Dobbs defended Trump's assertion. Dobbs claimed that "the numbers were inflated" and that the organizations behind the numbers "threw out science, statistics, and evidence to discredit the Trump administration".

In October 2018, when CNN and prominent Democrats were targeted with mail bomb, Dobbs described the bomb attempts as "fake news" and baselessly claimed that the mail bombs were sent by Democrats who sought to increase their support in the upcoming mid-term elections. The pipe bombs were in fact mailed by a fanatical Trump supporter. Several Fox News employees expressed dismay over Dobbs's rhetoric, with one employee telling CNN, "It's people like Dobbs who really ruin it for all the hard working journalists at Fox".

When the Trump administration rescinded CNN White House correspondent Jim Acosta's press pass, Dobbs supported the administration. At the same time, numerous media organizations, including Fox News, spoke out against the Trump administration's decision. When U.S. District Court Judge Timothy J. Kelly, a Trump appointee, temporarily restored Acosta's press pass, Dobbs described the ruling as "absurd". When the Trump administration complied with the ruling, Dobbs called on the administration to ignore the ruling and tell the "district court judge to go to hell".

In January 2019, Dobbs described Mitt Romney as a "traitor" and "treasonous" after he wrote an op-ed published in The Washington Post criticizing Trump's character. In July 2019, Dobbs referred to U.S. military generals who raised concerns about Trump's decision to put on a July 4 military show in Washington D.C. as "snowflake generals".

During the impeachment trial of Donald Trump, The New York Times reported that former Trump national security advisor and 11-year paid contributor to Fox News John Bolton had written in his forthcoming book that Trump had told him that he wanted to continue withholding aid to Ukraine until the country investigated Democrats and the Bidens. On his show the following day, Dobbs asserted that Bolton had been "reduced to a tool for the radical Dems and the deep state with his allegation".

The day senior Justice Department officials intervened in the case of longtime Trump associate Roger Stone with a recommendation of a lighter sentence than had been recommended by DOJ prosecutors the prior day, Dobbs stated on his program that attorney general Bill Barr was "doing the Lord's work" by intervening. The intervention raised questions about the political neutrality of the DOJ. The next day, Barr stated in a televised interview that Trump's comments about ongoing DOJ investigations "make it impossible to do my job", causing Dobbs to state on his program, "I guess I am so disappointed in Bill Barr, I have to say this – it's a damn shame when he doesn't get what this president has gone through, and what the American people have gone through, and what his charge is as attorney general." The following day, after the Justice Department stated it would not prosecute former FBI deputy director Andrew McCabe, a frequent target of Trump's ire, Dobbs stated on his program, "I have serious, serious questions tonight about the integrity of the Justice Department under Attorney General Barr."

As Trump, his surrogates and supporters made baseless claims of voting fraud in the aftermath of his 2020 election defeat, Dobbs chastised Republicans for not helping the president to claim "what is rightfully his". He said that Republicans who voted to certify Joe Biden's Electoral College win were "criminal". After Attorney General Bill Barr said there was no evidence of widespread fraud in the election, Dobbs said that Barr was "compromised" and had become part of the "deep state".

In December 2020, Dobbs aired a segment on his show debunking the very same conspiracy theories that had been amplified on his show; this was in response to a legal threat by the voting technology company Smartmatic which had been the subject of some of the conspiracy theorizing. Speaking to Republican consultant Ed Rollins during his January 4, 2021, broadcast, Dobbs said:

We're eight weeks from the election, and we still don't have verifiable, tangible support for the crimes that everyone knows were committed—that is, defrauding other citizens who voted with fraudulent votes. We know that's the case in Nevada, we know it's the case in Pennsylvania and a number of other states, but we have had a devil of a time finding actual proof. Why?

Following the storming of the United States Capitol by Trump supporters in January 2021, Dobbs was among those who advanced the baseless conspiracy theory that people associated with antifa were responsible for the attack.

=== George Soros conspiracy theories ===
Dobbs was a proponent of numerous conspiracy theories about the Jewish-American philanthropist and businessman George Soros. Dobbs referred to him as an "evil SOB" and insidious.

Dobbs's Fox Business Channel shows stirred controversy in October 2018 when a guest on Dobbs's show used what many described as an antisemitic trope to suggest that the State Department was "Soros-occupied" territory echoing the antisemitic conspiracy theory of a "Zionist-occupied government". The remarks came days after bombing attempts on Soros and leading Democrats, and the remarks were replayed on Fox Business hours after an anti-Semitic gunman at a Pittsburgh synagogue killed 11 people.

After widespread condemnation, Fox stated that the guest, Chris Farrell of Judicial Watch, would no longer be booked and that the program episode would be withdrawn from the Fox News archives. In the midst of the Trump–Ukraine scandal in November 2019, attorney Joseph diGenova made similar comments on Dobbs's program, falsely claiming that "George Soros controls a very large part of the career foreign service of the United States State Department. He also controls the activities of FBI agents overseas who work for NGOs – work with NGOs. That was very evident in Ukraine." Dobbs did not dispute diGenova's claim.

=== Other views ===
Dobbs opposed gun control and, though he was a fiscal conservative, supported some government regulations, as revealed in a 60 Minutes interview. He was critical of trade policies that he said encourage "sending jobs overseas".

Dobbs's stance on trade earned plaudits from some trade union activists on the traditional political left, while his stance on immigration tended to appeal to the right.

Dobbs was the author of War on the Middle Class, in which he claimed both Democrats and Republicans are harming the middle class. In it, he came out strongly against the Bush tax cuts, which he argued favor the wealthy, and argued for raising the U.S. minimum wage from what was then $5.15 an hour.

In March 2009, Dobbs said he thought there should not be a St. Patrick's Day.

== Reception ==
Journalist Amy Goodman criticized Dobbs's journalistic ethics, accusing him of making flagrant errors in his reporting and assailing his staff's association with what she describes as disreputable sources.

== Awards ==
Dobbs won numerous major awards for his television journalism, including a Lifetime Achievement Emmy Award and a Cable Ace Award. He received the George Foster Peabody Award for his coverage of the 1987 stock market crash. He also has received the Luminary Award of the Business Journalism Review in 1990, the Horatio Alger Association Award for Distinguished Americans in 1999 and the National Space Club Media Award in 2000. The Wall Street Journal has named Dobbs "TV's Premier Business News Anchorman". In 2004, Dobbs was awarded the Eugene Katz Award For Excellence in the Coverage of Immigration by the Center for Immigration Studies, an anti-immigrant think tank founded by white supremacist John Tanton, and in 2005 he received the now-defunct Alexis de Tocqueville Institution's Statesmanship Award. In 2008 Dobbs received the American Legion Public Relations Award from the National Commander of The American Legion.

== Personal life and death ==
Dobbs divorced his first wife in 1981 and later married Debi Lee Segura, a former CNN sports anchor. The couple raised four children together.

Dobbs died on July 18, 2024, at the age of 78.

== Books ==
- Lou Dobbs, with James O. Born, Border War, Forge (2014). ISBN 978-0765327710.
- Lou Dobbs, Independents Day: Awakening the American Spirit, Viking (2007). ISBN 978-0-670-01836-9.
- Lou Dobbs, Exporting America: Why Corporate Greed Is Shipping American Jobs Overseas, Warner Books (2004). ISBN 0-446-57744-8.
- Lou Dobbs, Space: The Next Business Frontier with HP Newquist, Pocket Books (2001). ISBN 0-7434-2389-5.
- Lou Dobbs, War on the Middle Class: How the Government, Big Business, and Special Interest Groups Are Waging War on the American Dream and How to Fight Back, Viking (2006). ISBN 0-670-03792-3.
- Ron Hira and Anil Hira, with foreword by Lou Dobbs, Outsourcing America: What's Behind Our National Crisis and How We Can Reclaim American Jobs. (AMACOM) American Management Association (May 2005). ISBN 0-8144-0868-0.
- Lou Dobbs, Upheaval, Threshold Editions (2014), ISBN 978-1-4767-2885-8.
- Lou Dobbs and James O. Born, Putin's Gambit: A Novel (2017), ISBN 978-0765376527.
- Lou Dobbs and Dennis Kneale, The Trump Century: How Our President Changed the Course of History Forever (2020), ISBN 978-0-06-302904-0.
