= The American (magazine) =

Online magazine published by the American Enterprise Institute

- Editor: Nick Schulz
- First issue: November 2006
- Final issue: December 2008 (print)
- Company: American Enterprise Institute
- Country: United States
- Based in: Washington, D. C.
- Language: English

The American was an online magazine published by the American Enterprise Institute (AEI), a conservative think tank in Washington, D.C. The magazine's primary focus was the intersection of economics and politics. Previously known as The American: A Magazine of Ideas, it was published six times annually from November 2006 to December 2008.

== Origins and editorship ==
The American was founded in November 2006 by James K. Glassman, the former president of The Atlantic Monthly and former publisher of The New Republic, as an AEI project. It replaced the previous public-affairs magazine published by AEI, The American Enterprise. Publication of the first issue was delayed until after the November 2006 election to include election results.

In late 2007, Glassman left The American to serve as undersecretary of state for public diplomacy in the George W. Bush administration; he was succeeded as editor-in-chief by Nick Schulz, who had served as a senior editor of the young magazine since its founding; the first issue edited by Schulz was labeled March/April 2008. (Glassman and Schulz had previously collaborated on TCS Daily.) Schulz is also the DeWitt Wallace Fellow at AEI.

In November 2008, AEI ended the print version of the glossy magazine due to its "'hemorrhaging' cash."

== Content ==
The magazine published articles and book reviews—some topical, some reported, some analytical—on subjects at the intersection of economics, business, politics, and American public policy. Current online content includes articles similar to those in the print version, traditional op-eds, "DataPoints" on public opinion (compiled by Karlyn Bowman), and, since May 2009, the Enterprise Blog, which features contributions from AEI scholars and staff members.

== Editorial stance ==
"Our perspective," Glassman said at the magazine's launch, "is not partisan, but it is rooted in liberal, free-market economics." Glassman said in 2006 that he believed "the three major business magazines"—that is, Forbes, Fortune, and BusinessWeek—"have, in an attempt to get a broader audience, gone downscale," creating a "big opening" for an intellectual magazine about business that is "absolutely not partisan or ideological—mainly a reported magazine rather than a magazine of opinion."

Liberal writer Jonathan Chait remarked in The New Republic (which Glassman had published from 1981 to 1984) that The American, in replacing The American Enterprise, "seems less dewy-eyed about the virtues of democracy and far more dewy-eyed about the virtues of the bottom line. Out is the conservatism of Paul Wolfowitz. In is the conservatism of Montgomery Burns."

== Contributors ==
Among the noteworthy contributors to The American have been:

- Michael Barone
- Gary Becker
- Tom Bethell
- Arthur C. Brooks
- Daniel Drezner
- John Fund
- Victor Davis Hanson
- Michael Ledeen
- Stephen Moore
- Kevin M. Murphy
- Charles Murray
- Norman J. Ornstein
- Henry Petroski
- Amity Shlaes

== Notable stories ==
Luke Mullins's interview of a white-collar criminal who spent time in a minimum-security prison, which stated that minimum-security prisons were no longer "country-club prisons," prompted criticism by Peter Carlson in a column in The Washington Post.
