= Kevin Hassett =

American economist (born 1962)

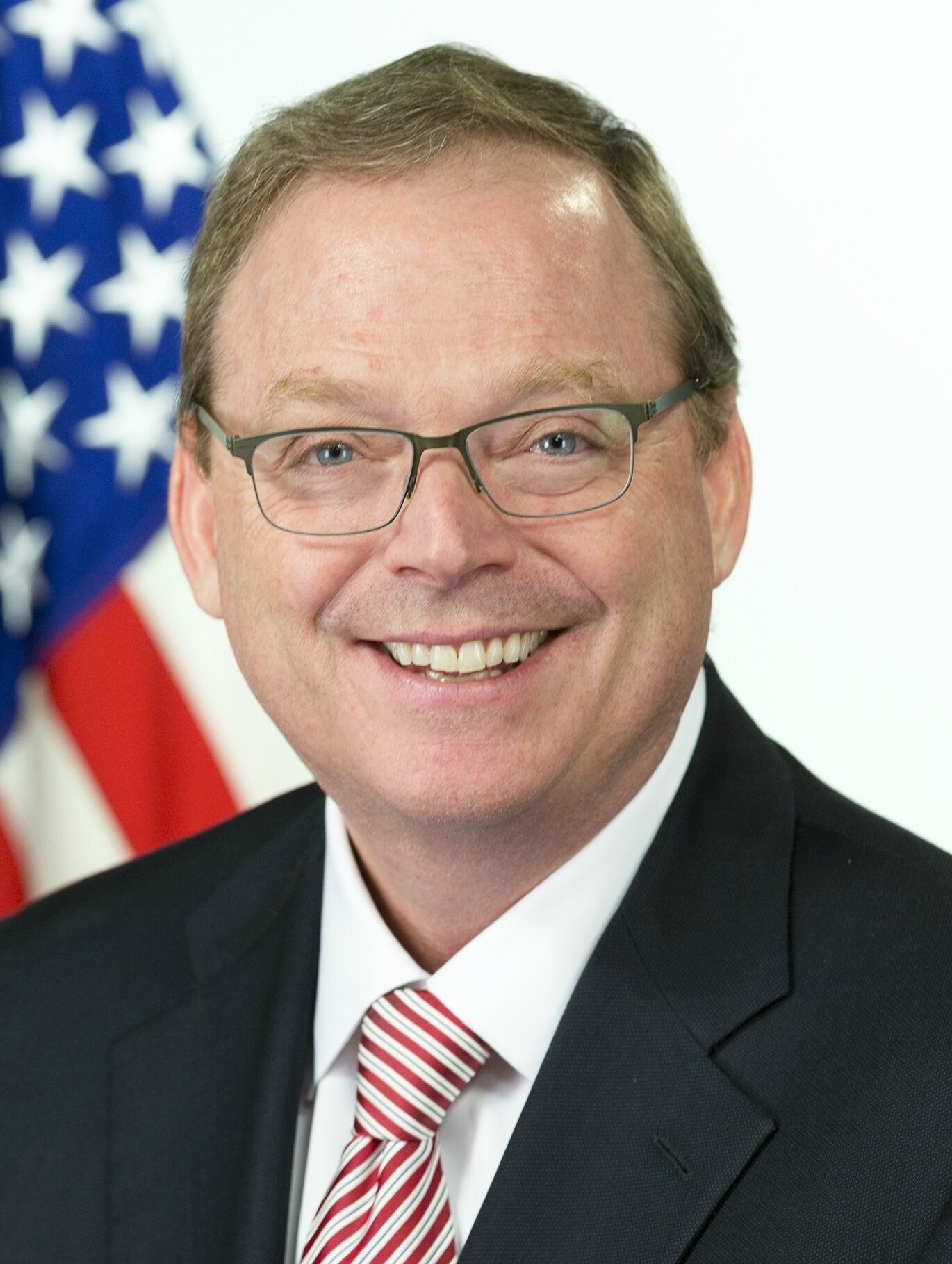
- Official portrait, 2018

Director of the National Economic Council
- Incumbent
- Assumed office January 20, 2025
- President: Donald Trump
- Preceded by: Lael Brainard

Senior Advisor to the President for Economic Issues
- In office April 15, 2020 – July 1, 2020
- President: Donald Trump
- Preceded by: Position established
- Succeeded by: Position abolished

29th Chair of the Council of Economic Advisers
- In office September 13, 2017 – June 28, 2019
- President: Donald Trump
- Preceded by: Jason Furman
- Succeeded by: Tomas J. Philipson (acting)

Personal details
- Born: Kevin Allen Hassett; March 20, 1962 (age 64) Greenfield, Massachusetts, U.S.
- Party: Republican
- Spouse: Kristie
- Children: 2
- Education: Swarthmore College (BA); University of Pennsylvania (MA, PhD)

Kevin Allen Hassett (born March 20, 1962) is an American economist who has been the director of the National Economic Council since 2025. He was the senior advisor and chairman of the Council of Economic Advisers from 2017 to 2019.

Hassett has worked at the American Enterprise Institute, a conservative think tank. He was John McCain's chief economic adviser in the 2000 presidential primaries and the 2008 presidential election campaign. Hassett was also economic adviser to the 2004 campaign of George W. Bush and to Mitt Romney's 2012 presidential campaign.

Hassett taught as a professor of economics at Columbia Graduate Business School and NYU; he also served as a research economist with the U.S. Federal Reserve Board of Governors for nearly a decade.

In the first Trump administration, Hassett served as the 29th chairman of the Council of Economic Advisers from September 2017 to June 2019. He returned to the White House in 2020 to work on the administration's response to the coronavirus pandemic. Hassett did not focus on public health policy, but rather influenced the administration's response from an economic angle amid lockdowns and social distancing.

On November 26, 2024, President-elect Donald Trump announced Hassett would be his director of the National Economic Council in his second administration.

== Early life and education ==
Hassett is from Greenfield, Massachusetts, where he graduated from Greenfield High School. He attended Swarthmore College where he was captain of the varsity track team and graduated summa cum laude with a Bachelor of Arts degree in economics in 1984, followed by a PhD in economics (focusing on applied econometrics) from the University of Pennsylvania under the supervision of Alan J. Auerbach.

== Career ==
Hassett began his academic career at Columbia Graduate School of Business as an assistant professor of economics from 1989 to 1993, then an associate professor there, from 1993 to 1994. From 1992 to 1997, Hassett also held the position of Senior Economist in the Division of Research and Statistics at the Federal Reserve Board of Governors. He served as a policy consultant to the United States Treasury Department during the George H. W. Bush and Bill Clinton administrations.

=== American Enterprise Institute ===
Hassett joined the American Enterprise Institute (AEI) as a resident scholar in 1997. He worked on tax policy, fiscal policy, energy issues, and stock market structure. He collaborated with R. Glenn Hubbard on work on the budget surplus, income inequality, and tax reform. Hassett published papers and articles on capital taxation, the consistency of tax policy, returns on energy conservation investments, corporate taxation, telecommunications competition, the effects of taxation on wages, dividend taxation, and carbon taxes.

In 2003, Hassett was named director of economic policy studies at AEI. Hassett was a regular contributor and columnist in newspapers like The New York Times, The Washington Post, and The Wall Street Journal. He wrote a monthly column for National Review and a weekly column for Bloomberg.

In 2007, Hassett argued that the United States was on the wrong side of the Laffer curve in terms of corporate tax rates. Some commentators characterized a graph that he used to support his argument as deceptive.

For the 2008 spring term, Hassett was a visiting professor at New York University Law School.

=== Donald Trump administrations ===
==== Chair of White House Council of Economic Advisors ====
Hassett's nomination by Trump to lead the Council of Economic Advisers was met with opposition by some anti-immigration groups such as Breitbart News and the Center for Immigration Studies, in addition to opposition by white nationalist groups such as American Renaissance. According to The New York Times, Hassett, "[l]ike most economists... believes that immigration spurs economic growth." Prior to Hassett's nomination, President Trump "broke with recent tradition and removed the council's chairman from a cabinet-level position".

On September 5, 2018, the Council of Economic Advisors released new analysis indicating that real wage growth under Trump was higher than reported, despite figures suggesting that wage growth had not picked up. Hassett said "Much of the commentary about wage growth that we see is influenced by confusion we find about proper measurement. The headlines have missed the real wage growth."

On September 13, 2018, during an official visit to Ireland, when asked whether the U.S. considered Ireland a tax haven, Hassett said, "It's not Ireland's fault US tax law was written by someone on acid." Hassett had labeled Ireland as a tax haven on several interviews in August–December 2017, when advocating for the Tax Cuts and Jobs Act of 2017 ("TCJA"). In July 2018, Seamus Coffey, Chairperson of the Irish Fiscal Advisory Council and author of the Irish State's 2016 review of the Irish corporate tax code posted that Ireland could now see a "boom" in the onshoring of U.S. intellectual property, via the Irish Capital Allowances for Intangible Assets BEPS tool which is enhanced by Hassett's TCJA legislation. In February 2019, Brad Setser from the Council on Foreign Relations, wrote a New York Times article highlighting the failings of Hassett's TCJA in addressing the use of tax havens by U.S. corporates and why the TCJA incentivized U.S. corporate use of tax havens.

On June 2, 2019, it was announced that Hassett would be stepping down from his role within the coming weeks.

==== Return to the first Trump administration ====
On March 20, 2020, it was announced that Hassett would be returning to the White House on a temporary basis to advise President Trump on economic policy amid the COVID-19 pandemic. On April 15, 2020, the Trump administration announced Hassett's appointment as a senior advisor. Hassett encouraged the administration to re-open the economy, saying that "Our human capital stock is ready to get back to work", referring to American workers. In early May 2020, Hassett said there might not be a need for more coronavirus economic relief, invoking the possibility that economies in nearly all states could be re-opened by the end of May.

=== Second Trump administration ===
Hassett was reportedly shortlisted for nomination as chair of the Federal Reserve if former president Donald Trump were to win re-election in 2024. When President Donald Trump took office for the second time, he chose Hassett as director of the National Economic Council. During Trump's second term, Hassett defended his tariff threats against other countries.

After winning the 2024 election, President-elect Donald Trump announced that Hassett would serve as director of the National Economic Council (NEC). Politico wrote that Hassett "would take on an expanded role as the president's top adviser on economic matters and play a key part in coordinating policies and strategy across the government." Hassett became director of the NEC in January 2025 at the start of the second Trump administration.

In October 2025, Treasury Secretary Scott Bessent confirmed that Hassett was on the short list of five candidates being considered by President Trump to replace Chair of the Federal Reserve Jerome Powell when his term ends in May 2026. Kevin Warsh was ultimately selected for the role.

== Bibliography ==
- Hassett, Kevin. "Spending, Taxes and Certainty: A Road Map to 4%", in The 4% Solution: Unleashing the Economic Growth America Needs, edited by Brendan Miniter. New York: Crown Business. 2012.
- Alan J. Auerbach and Kevin A. Hassett, eds. Toward Fundamental Tax Reform. Washington, D.C.: AEI Press, 2005. (ISBN 0-8447-4234-1)
- Kevin A. Hassett. Bubbleology: The New Science of Stock Market Winners and Losers. New York: Crown Business, 2002. (ISBN 0-609-60929-7)
- Kevin A. Hassett and R. Glenn Hubbard, eds. Inequality and Tax Policy. South Bend, Indiana, Washington, D.C.: AEI Press, 2001. (ISBN 0-8447-4144-2)
- Kevin A. Hassett and R. Glenn Hubbard. Transition Costs of Fundamental Tax Reform. Washington, D.C.: AEI Press, 2001. (ISBN 0-8447-4112-4)
- James K. Glassman and Kevin A. Hassett. Dow 36,000: The New Strategy for Profiting from the Coming Rise in the Stock Market. New York: Times Books, 1999. (ISBN 0-609-80699-8)
- Kevin A. Hassett and R. Glenn Hubbard. The Magic Mountain: A Guide to Defining and Using a Budget Surplus. New York: Free Press, 1999. (ISBN 0-8447-7127-9)
- James K. Glassman and Kevin A. Hassett. Dow 36,000: The New Strategy for Profiting from the Coming Rise in the Stock Market. New York: Times Books, 1999. (ISBN 0-609-80699-8)
- Kevin A. Hassett. Tax Policy and Investment. Washington, D.C.: AEI Press, 1999. (ISBN 0-8447-7086-8)
- Hassett, Kevin A. (2008). "Investment". In David R. Henderson (ed.). Concise Encyclopedia of Economics (2nd ed.). Indianapolis, Indiana: Library of Economics and Liberty. pp. 304–308. ISBN 978-0-86597-665-8. OCLC 237794267.

=== Dow 36,000 ===
Hassett is coauthor with James K. Glassman of Dow 36,000: The New Strategy for Profiting from the Coming Rise in the Stock Market. It was published in 1999 before the dot-com bubble burst. The book's title was based on a calculation that, in the absence of the equity premium, stock prices would be approximately four times as high as they actually were.

== See also ==
- Apple's EU tax dispute
- Base erosion and profit shifting
- Double Irish arrangement

Political offices
Preceded by Jason Furman	Chair of the Council of Economic Advisers; 2017–2019	Succeeded by Tomas J. Philipson; Acting
Preceded by Lael Brainard	Director of the National Economic Council; 2025–present	Incumbent
