= Everett Carll Ladd =

American political scientist (1937–1999)

Everett Ladd
- Born: Everett Carll Ladd Jr. September 24, 1937; Saco, Maine, U.S.
- Died: December 8, 1999 (aged 62); Willimantic, Connecticut, U.S.
- Education: Bates College (BA); Cornell University (MA, PhD)

Everett Carll Ladd Jr. (September 24, 1937 – December 8, 1999) was an American political scientist based at the University of Connecticut. He was best known for his analysis and collection of public opinion polls. He directed the Roper Center for Public Opinion Research at the University of Connecticut; the Center's mission is to collect and preserve the reports and the original raw computerized data (on IBM cards and tapes) of polls and surveys since the 1930s. At his death, he had amassed 14,000 surveys from many countries. He was also an expert on the opinions and careers of social scientists.

== Biography ==
Ladd was born on September 24, 1937, in Saco, Maine. He graduated from Bates College, and earned a PhD in political science from Cornell University. He was appointed professor of political science at the University Connecticut in 1964, and retired in 1999.

He wrote more than twenty books, including a widely used university textbook on American government (The American Polity: The People and Their Government). He taught at the American Enterprise Institute for Public Policy Research in Washington, D.C. He was awarded fellowships by the Ford, Guggenheim and Rockefeller Foundations; the Center for International Studies at Harvard University; and the Hoover Institution and the Center for Advanced Study in the Behavioral Sciences, both at Stanford University. He has been called, "One of the leading realignment theorists."

Ladd was critical of grand models of realignment, and focused instead on highly specific details in major presidential elections. In his book Ideology in America he considered a spectrum from parochialism to cosmopolitanism in addition to the usual spectrum between liberalism and conservatism. In a review by L. A. Free it is asserted that cosmopolitanism may account for why "managers of big companies can realistically be described as liberals" and parochialism is why "many of the blue collar group [have] become conservative".

He reached out to the public through a column in The Christian Science Monitor (1987–1995) and op-ed essays in The Wall Street Journal, The New York Times and elsewhere. The media often interviewed him regarding new polling results. He was a senior editor of Public Opinion magazine and an editor at The American Enterprise magazine.

He died of heart failure on December 8, 1999, at Windham Memorial Community Hospital in Willimantic, Connecticut.

== Selected publications ==
- Ladd, Everett Carll Jr. (1966). Negro Political Leadership in the South. Ithaca, New York: Cornell University Press. ISBN 978-0801402401.
- Ladd, Everett Carll (1969). Ideology in America. Ithaca, New York: Cornell University Press. ISBN 978-0819152190. Reprinted with new introduction 1986 by University Press of America.
- Ladd, Everett Carll Jr. (1970). American Political Parties: Social Change and Political Response. New York: W. W. Norman & Co. Inc. ISBN 978-0393099645. Review in JSTOR.
- Lipset, Seymour Martin; Ladd, Everett Carll Jr. (1972). "The Politics of American Sociologists". American Journal of Sociology. 78 (1): 67–104. doi:10.1086/225296. JSTOR 2776571. S2CID 143621351.
- Ladd, Everett Carll Jr.; Hadley, Charles D. (1973). "Party Definition and Party Differentiation". Public Opinion Quarterly. 37 (1): 21–34. doi:10.1086/268057. JSTOR 2747812.
- Ladd, Everett Carll Jr.; Lipset, Seymour Martin (1973). Academics, Politics, and the 1972 Election. Washington, D.C.: American Enterprise Institute for Public Policy Research. ISBN 978-0844731087. Review in JSTOR.
- Ladd, Everett Carll Jr.; Hadley, Charles D. (1974). Political Parties and Political Issues: Patterns in Differentiation Since the New Deal. SAGE Publications. ISBN 978-0803903579.
- Ladd, Everett Carll Jr.; Hadley, Charles D. (1975). Transformations of the American Party System: Political Coalitions from the New Deal to the 1970s. New York: W. W. Norton & Co. ISBN 978-0393092035. Review in JSTOR.
- Ladd, Everett Carll Jr.; Lipset, Seymour Martin (1976). The Divided Academy: Professors and Politics. New York: McGraw-Hill. ISBN 978-0393008371. Review in JSTOR.
- Ladd, Everett Carll Jr. (1978). Where Have All the Voters Gone? The Fracturing of America's Political Parties. New York: W. W. Norton & Co. ISBN 978-0393015744. Review in JSTOR.
- Ladd, Everett Carll (1985). The American Polity: The People and Their Government. New York: W. W. Norton & Co. ISBN 978-0393953480. Textbook: 5th edition 1993.
- Ladd, Everett Carll (1985). "On Mandates, Realignments, and the 1984 Presidential Election". Political Science Quarterly. 100 (1): 1–24. doi:10.2307/2150858. JSTOR 2150858.
- Ladd, Everett (1991). Shafer, Byron E. (ed.). The End of Realignment? Interpreting American Electoral Eras. University of Wisconsin Press. Essay – Like Waiting for Godot: The Uselessness of 'Realignment' for Understanding Change in Contemporary American Politics.
- Ladd, Everett Carll (1995). "The 1994 Congressional Elections: The Postindustrial Realignment Continues". Political Science Quarterly. 110 (1): 1–22. doi:10.2307/2152048. JSTOR 2152048.
- Ladd, Everett Carll; Bowman, Karlyn H. (1996). Public Opinion in America and Japan: How We See Each Other and Ourselves. Washington, D.C.: American Enterprise Institute Press. ISBN 978-0844770574.
