= The American Enterprise =

Liberal and neoconservative public policy magazine (1990–2006)

- Former editors: Karlyn Bowman, Karl Zinsmeister
- Categories: public policy
- Founder: Karlyn Bowman
- Founded: 1990
- Final issue: 2006
- Company: American Enterprise Institute
- Country: United States
- Based in: Washington, D.C.
- Language: English
- Website: www.taemag.com
- ISSN: 1047-3572

The American Enterprise (TAE) was a public policy magazine published by the American Enterprise Institute (AEI) in Washington, D.C. Its editorial stance was generally to advocate economic liberalism and a neoconservative U.S. foreign policy.

== Format ==
The magazine was published approximately eight times per year. In addition to the content published in its print version, the magazine's Web site included articles and opinion pieces published under the name TAE Daily.

The editor in 1990 was Karlyn Keene, a public opinion specialist. The magazine combined several AEI publications. The AEI Economist became the new magazine's "The Washington Economist" column, written by Herbert Stein. Bowman and Everett Carll Ladd compiled "Public Opinion and Demographic Report," a twenty-four page selection of polling data that offered a condensed version of Public Opinion. TAE's second editor, from 1995 to 2006, was Karl Zinsmeister. When he left to join the Bush White House, the magazine was shuttered. It was replaced in 2006 by a new publication, The American.

== Topics ==
In its January/February 1990 edition, The American Enterprise published a group of polls on black American attitudes about the role of government in helping the poor.
