= TCS Daily =

Former online magazine

TCS Daily was an online magazine with commentary and analysis on current news from a free-market perspective. It was active between 2000 and 2010.

== History and profile ==
TCS is an initialism that now stands for "Technology, Commerce, Society"; when the website was founded in 2000, those three letters stood for its original name, "Tech Central Station." The journal was originally published by DCI Group, a lobbying and PR firm based in Washington, D.C. In 2006, it was sold to Nick Schulz, who had been its editor since 2001. Some critics have written that Schulz is "a paid spokesperson for the oil industry" since his website is sponsored in part by Exxon Mobil. Before the sale, it was "hosted" by James K. Glassman, a resident fellow at the American Enterprise Institute and syndicated columnist. In 2006, he left TCS to become editor of The American; Schulz transferred ownership of TCS to New River Media, Inc. a Washington-based media company. Schulz continued as editor in chief, until he followed Glassman to The American and soon replaced him as that magazine's editor. In December, 2010, Publisher Andrew Walworth, president of Grace Creek Media, announced that TCS would be folded into the website of the weekly public television series, "Ideas in Action," which was a co-production between Grace Creek and The George W. Bush Institute and hosted by Glassman.

In its original incarnation, TCS was primarily funded by sponsors that included AT&T, The Coca-Cola Company, ExxonMobil, General Motors Corporation, McDonald's, Merck, Microsoft, Nasdaq, and PhRMA. However, according to the website, the sale of the journal in 2006 rendered all previous sponsorships expired.

TCS folded in December 2010.
