= Dow 36,000 =

1999 book predicting rapid rise in stock prices

Dow 36,000: The New Strategy for Profiting From the Coming Rise in the Stock Market
- Authors: James K. Glassman; Kevin A. Hassett
- Working title: Dow 36,000
- Genre: Investments
- Publisher: Crown Business
- Publication date: October 1, 1999
- Publication place: United States
- Pages: 304
- ISBN: 978-0812931457

Dow 36,000: The New Strategy for Profiting From the Coming Rise in the Stock Market is a book published in September 1999 by conservative syndicated columnist James K. Glassman and conservative economist Kevin Hassett, in which they argued that stocks in 1999 were significantly undervalued and concluded that there would be a fourfold market increase with the Dow Jones Industrial Average (DJIA) to 36,000 by 2002 or 2004. The book was described as the "most spectacularly wrong investing book ever". In the book, the authors argued that stocks did not have significantly greater risk than bonds in the long run and as investors came to that realization, stock prices would rise dramatically. The authors expected the equity risk premium to dissipate, which never happened. They also expected stocks to rise due to better fiscal and monetary policy, globalization, peace abroad and better corporate management.

Five years after the book was published, it was ridiculed and traded for pennies on Amazon.com.

In November 2021, the DJIA finally did reach 36,000, 22 years after the book was published, after years of declines due to the bursting of the dot-com bubble, the September 11 attacks, the 2008 financial crisis, and the 2020 stock market crash. At that time, Glassman hedged his original prediction saying, "The title was easy to caricature" and "Never associate a date with a number".

== Lost bet and charitable donation ==
Excerpts from the book were published in The Atlantic in 1999. In the January 2000 issue of The Atlantic, Glassman and Hassett replied to a critic of their theory that "if the Dow is closer to 10,000 than to 36,000 ten years from now, [i.e. if it is below 23,000] we will each give $1,000 to the charity of your choice." In early 2010, Glassman and Hassett conceded they lost the bet and they each donated $1,000 to the Salvation Army.

On October 18, 2017, the Dow closed above 23,000, thus finally reaching more than halfway from 10,000 to 36,000.

== Authors ==
Glassman was named an undersecretary of state for public diplomacy and public affairs by President George W. Bush.

In November 2024, Hassett was appointed as Director of the White House National Economic Council by Donald Trump.
