= Jay Wallace (journalist) =

American broadcast executive

Jay Wallace is an American journalist and broadcast executive. He has been the President of Fox News since May 2018. He has worked at the Fox News Channel since its inception in 1996.

Wallace graduated with a BA from Hofstra University in 2000, and serves on the Dean's Council for the Herbert School of Communications.
