= Karlyn Bowman =

American editor

Karlyn H. Bowman, formerly known as Karlyn H. Keene, is a politically conservative American editor and public opinion analyst. She is currently a senior fellow at the American Enterprise Institute. She was the managing editor of Public Opinion from 1979 to 1990 and the founding editor of The American Enterprise from 1990 to 1995. Bowman is the author of several AEI Studies in Public Opinion.
