= James K. Glassman =

American journalist (born 1947)

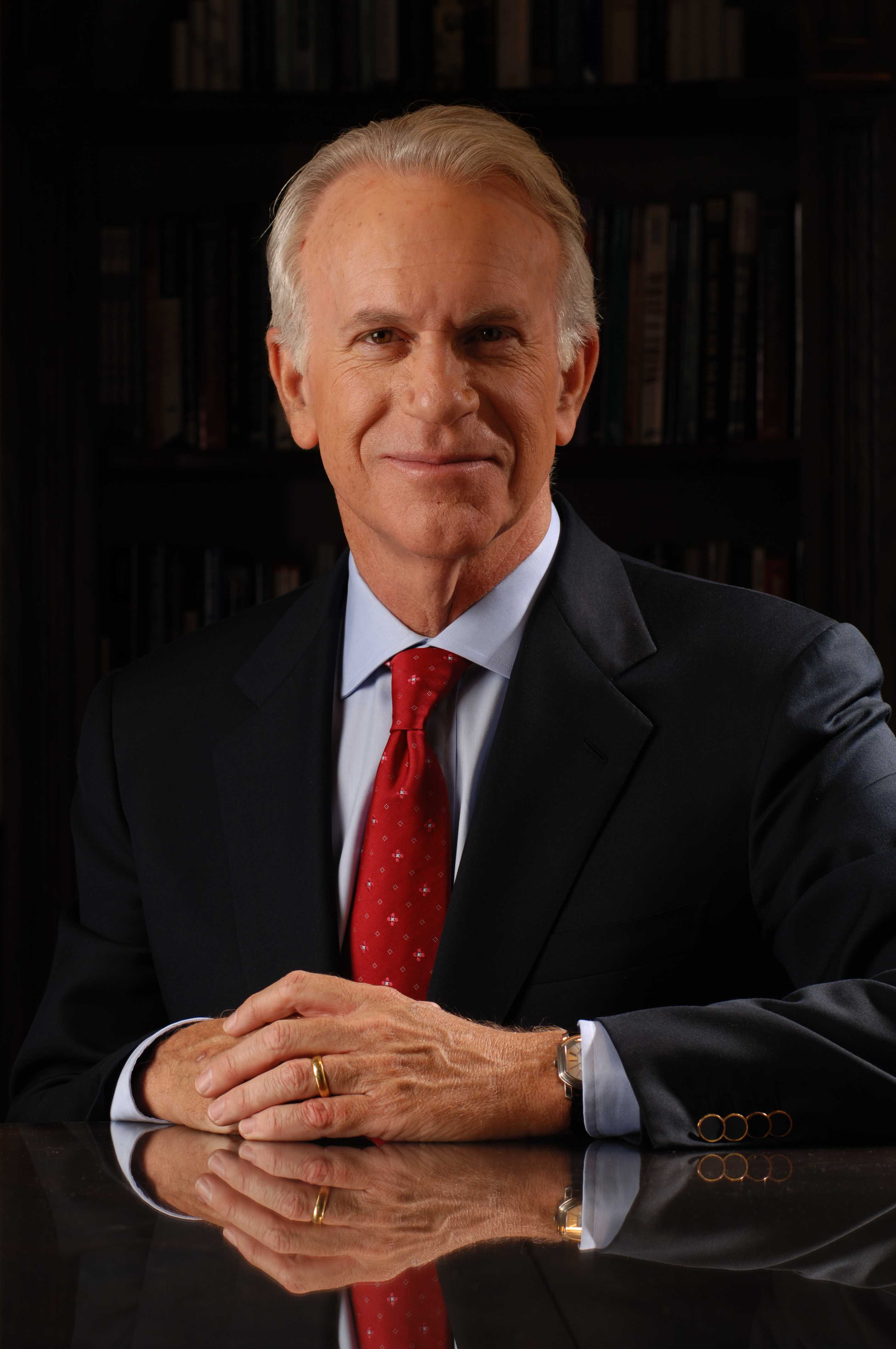
- Glassman in 2007

5th Under Secretary of State for Public Diplomacy and Public Affairs
- In office June 10, 2008 – January 15, 2009
- President: George W. Bush
- Preceded by: Karen Hughes
- Succeeded by: Judith McHale

Personal details
- Born: January 1, 1947 (age 79) Washington, DC, United States
- Spouse: Beth Ourisman
- Children: 2 (plus 2 stepchildren)
- Education: Harvard University (BA)

James Kenneth Glassman (born January 1, 1947) served as Under Secretary of State for Public Diplomacy and Public Affairs from 2008 to 2009. From 2009 to 2013, he was the founding executive director of the George W. Bush Institute, a public policy development institution focused on creating independent, nonpartisan solutions to America's most pressing public policy problems through the principles that guided President George W. Bush and his wife Laura in public life. The George W. Bush Institute is based within the George W. Bush Presidential Center on the campus of Southern Methodist University in Dallas.

Glassman has also worked as a journalist, magazine publisher, and business writer, and in the field of economic policy development. He is perhaps best known for co-writing the book Dow 36,000 (published 1999), in which he predicted that the Dow Jones Industrial Average would approximately triple in value to 36,000 points by early 2005. On November 1, 2021, the Dow first crossed 36,000, more than twenty years after his book was published.

Presently, he is chairman of Glassman Enterprises, LLC, a Washington, D.C.–based public affairs consulting firm whose clients include several Fortune 100 companies in fields including health care and energy. In 2003, the Washington Monthly credited Glassman with inventing "journo-lobbying" by writing a large number of seemingly independent opinion columns that aligned closely with the interests of his lobbying clients; his output included columns that questioned the science behind climate change.

== Personal life and education ==
Glassman was born into a Jewish family in Washington, D.C. to parents Stanley and Elaine Glassman. He attended Sidwell Friends School. He graduated cum laude from Harvard College with a B.A. in government in 1969. He is married to Beth Ourisman Glassman and has two children, two stepchildren, three grandchildren and two step-grandchildren. His daughter, Kate Bennett, is a White House reporter for CNN. He lives in Washington, D.C.

== Career ==
Glassman began his career as a journalist and publisher.

While a student at Harvard, he served as managing editor of The Harvard Crimson. After graduation, he took a job as a Sunday writer for the Boston Herald Traveler. In 1971 he became editor and publisher of The Advocate of Provincetown, Mass.

In 1972, Glassman began a weekly newspaper in New Orleans, called Figaro. He sold the paper in 1979 and moved back to Washington as executive editor of The Washingtonian magazine. In 1981, he served as publisher of The New Republic before becoming president of The Atlantic Monthly. He simultaneously served as executive vice president of U.S. News & World Report between 1984 and 1986.

From 1987 until 1993, Glassman was part owner and editor of Roll Call. He and his partner, Arthur Levitt Jr., sold the company to The Economist.

In 2000, he founded Tech Central Station (now TCS Daily), an online magazine.

Between 1993 and 2004, he wrote a syndicated column for The Washington Post business section and the International Herald Tribune.

Glassman has also worked in television. He was moderator of CNN's "Capital Gang Sunday" from 1995 to 1998. During this time he also hosted PBS's weekly "TechnoPolitics". From February 2010 to June 2012, he hosted "Ideas in Action", a weekly PBS series on public policy issues.

From 1996 to 2008, Glassman was a senior fellow at the American Enterprise Institute in Washington, D.C. While there, from 2005 to 2007, he founded and served as editor in chief of The American, the American Enterprise Institute's bimonthly magazine of business and economics.

In 2003 Glassman served on the U.S. government's Advisory Board on Public Diplomacy in the Arab and Muslim World.

From June 2007 to June 2008, he was chairman of the Broadcasting Board of Governors (BBG), directing all nonmilitary, taxpayer–funded U.S. international broadcasting, including Voice of America, Radio Free Europe, Radio Free Asia, the Office of Cuba Broadcasting, and Middle East Broadcasting Networks (Alhurra TV and Radio Sawa).

On December 11, 2007, Glassman was nominated by President George W. Bush to replace Karen Hughes as the undersecretary of state for public diplomacy and public affairs.[2] He served in the position from June 2008 to January 2009, leading the governmentwide international strategic communications effort. Among his accomplishments at the State Department was bringing new Internet technology to bear on outreach to foreign publics, an approach he christened "Public Diplomacy 2.0". In an interview in 2009, he put forward a case that in the long run the Iraq War will prove to have been a positive decision, saying that it will be ultimately "beneficial to the war of ideas in the sense that a functioning democracy that we hope will be stable and prosperous now exists in the Middle East, and is showing other nations and other people what a democracy looks like."

Newsweek said about him: "James K. Glassman, as they say in Washington, gets it. The under secretary of state for public diplomacy has been on the job for only six months, but he has already scored small successes in the U.S. effort to win over 'hearts and minds' in the Muslim world, a hard sell if ever there was one... Glassman has finally figured out how to sell the American idea abroad."

He continued to serve as a governor of the BBG, representing the secretary of state, during his time as under secretary.

On September 3, 2009, Glassman was named founding executive director of the George W. Bush Institute, a public policy institute dedicated to research and action in education, global health, human freedom, and economic growth. The Institute is part of the George W. Bush Presidential Center, which also includes a presidential library and museum on the campus of Southern Methodist University in Dallas, Texas.

For the 2009–10 school year, he was diplomat-in-residence at the School of International Service at American University in Washington, D.C. He taught a course on public diplomacy to undergraduates.

He was formerly a member of the Policy Advisory Board of Intel Corporation and was senior adviser to AT&T Corporation and SAP America, Inc.

In 2013, Glassman became president of the public affairs firm Public Affairs Engagement, based in Roslyn, Virginia.

In 2016, he left Public Affairs Engagement and started his own firm, Glassman Enterprises, LLC, based in Washington, D.C., with an array of clients that include pharmaceutical firms, manufacturers, and non-profits.

In 2020, Glassman, along with over 130 other former Republican national security officials, signed a statement that asserted that President Trump was unfit to serve another term, and "To that end, we are firmly convinced that it is in the best interest of our nation that Vice President Joe Biden be elected as the next President of the United States, and we will vote for him."

He is (as of 2020) chairman of the non-profit Strategic Health Diplomacy, which educates Americans on the importance of global health programs, and a board member of Making Every Vote Count, a non-partisan organization dedicated to electing the U.S. president by popular vote.

He is a frequent commentator on business and investing issues. His work has been published in the Los Angeles Times, The New York Times, The Wall Street Journal, The Washington Post, Forbes, The Atlantic Monthly, Reader's Digest, and The Times Literary Supplement (London).

Additionally, Glassman served as one of 21 members of the Investor Advisory Committee of the Securities and Exchange Commission, established in April 2012 as part of the Dodd–Frank law, through 2018, and the advisory board of America Abroad Media.

== Books ==
External videos
- Booknotes interview with Glassman on Dow 36,000, October 3, 1999, C-SPAN

His first book, Dow 36,000, was published in 1999, near the peak of the late-1990s stock market bubble.

The book was later criticized by Washington Post reporter Carlos Lozada, who asked, "You don't feel the need to apologize to someone who read your book, went in and got creamed?" Glassman replied, "Absolutely not". Nobel laureate Paul Krugman argued on his faculty website that the book contained basic arithmetic errors and was "very silly". Economist and blogger Nate Silver described the book as "charlatanic" and suggested on empirical grounds that the authors had failed to notice that at the time of writing stock prices were "as overvalued as at literally any time in American history".

John C. Bogle, then senior chairman of The Vanguard Group, however, said in a blurb for the book "While there will be bumps--maybe big ones--along the way and the road may be surprisingly long, Dow 36,000 offers superb advice. With an eminently readable style, the authors present sound and simple wisdom about investment principles, mutual fund selection, index funds, and asset allocation. I am impressed!"

David Malpass, who later served as president of the World Bank, said, "Glassman and Hassett's ideas are timely and thought-provoking. Either we are in a bubble with inefficient financial markets, or else past theories on stock prices and price-earnings multiples have to be revised. In every one of my meetings with mutual funds these days, I have to address the issue of whether stocks are overvalued. Glassman and Hassett's theories make the solid case that, on average, they are not."

In 2011, in his third book, Safety Net: The Strategy for De-Risking Your Investments in a Time of Turbulence, he wrote "I was wrong" about his predictions in Dow 36,000, noting that the Dow Jones went up only 20 percent since publication of the book and returns during the intervening years were only "a few piddling percentage points." In Safety Net, he argued that "the world has changed" over the past decade; that the U.S. relative economic position had declined and that the risk of catastrophic events had increased. He warned investors to adopt a new definition of risk, moving beyond the notion of financial volatility.

In 2012, he wrote the introduction of The 4% Solution: Unleashing the Economic Growth America Needs, published by the George W. Bush Presidential Center.

In March 2013, he reverted to his former position, stating in an article for Bloomberg L.P. that while he had underestimated the level of volatility in world events, he believed that reaching 'Dow 36,000' was still possible within less than a decade with the right policies. Gawker Media, in an article on his predictions, described him as having written "the most hilariously wrong investment book of all time".

His second book, The Secret Code of the Superior Investor: How to Be a Long-Term Winner in a Short-Term World, was published by Three Rivers Press in December 2002. The book focused on the construction of a solid personal portfolio. It offered advice for finding the best individual stocks and mutual funds even in uncertain times and volatile markets.

At the heart of Glassman's "secret code" is the belief that stocks are the best long-term bet there is. The trick is finding solid companies to invest in and then sticking with those companies through thick and thin. Glassman wrote a weekly and twice-weekly investment column for The Washington Post from 1993 to 2004 and since then has written a monthly column for Kiplinger's Personal Finance.
