= History of CNN =

The Cable News Network (CNN) is an American basic cable and satellite television channel owned by the CNN Worldwide division of Warner Bros. Discovery. Upon its launch, CNN became the first channel to provide 24-hour television news coverage, and was the first all-news television network in the United States.

Founded as a subsidiary of Turner Broadcasting System in 1980 by Ted Turner and Reese Schonfeld, the channel helped pave the way for other Turner sister networks like Headline News (HLN), the channel with the same acronym TBS, Cartoon Network, etc. Its success set the stage for conglomerate Time Warner's acquisition of the parent company in 1996. Time Warner later became WarnerMedia after AT&T Inc.'s buyout in 2018. However, due to creative differences and debts, AT&T split from WarnerMedia as it merged with Discovery, Inc., forming Warner Bros. Discovery in 2022.

== 1980–1990: Early history ==
=== Launch ===
Three and a half years before CNN's launch, in December 1976, Ted Turner turned his Atlanta, Georgia independent station WTCG into one of the original satellite-distributed television channels, leasing a transponder on RCA's Satcom 1 geostationary satellite. The Cable News Network was intended to be distributed on RCA's new Satcom 3, which was lost on its launch date of December 7, 1979. Because replacement transmission capacity was not readily available, the Turner Broadcasting System filed suit against RCA seeking use of another communications satellite and $35.5 million in damages. On March 5, Turner announced that a consent order had been worked out with RCA in federal court, allowing CNN to begin operations on June 1 as scheduled, using a transponder on Satcom 1.

The network launched on Sunday, June 1, 1980, at 6:00 p.m. Eastern Time with an original staff of 300 employees based at its headquarters in Atlanta, and bureaus in Chicago, Dallas, Los Angeles, New York City, San Francisco and Washington, D.C. The station first pictured a shot of the CNN logo on a red background bar with a 750 hertz beep tone followed by silence. Afterwards, the inaugural broadcast on the channel was an introduction by Ted Turner.Turner declared that CNN would only sign on once (at the launch) and would not sign off until the end of the world, which they would cover live. He even commissioned the doomsday tape that would be broadcast by the last employee in the event of a global catastrophe scenario, in which a band played the hymn Nearer, My God, to Thee, which is the song said to have been played on the Titanic when it sank.

Following the introduction and a pre-recorded version of "The Star-Spangled Banner" (which was a tradition whenever a new Turner-owned network launched) that was played afterward officially opening the husband and wife team of Dave Walker and Lois Hart as they news anchored the channel's very first newscast. Among the first segments was an interview with then-President Jimmy Carter by Daniel Schorr. And to let "the undecided voter … hear the issues debated by all three leading candidates" in the second 1980 presidential debate, Schorr read the debate questions to John B. Anderson. CNN then aired Anderson's live responses along with tape delay of Carter and Ronald Reagan's responses, despite technical difficulties. In April 1981, CNN successfully sued the Big Three television networks and the Reagan administration for equal representation in the White House press corps.

On January 1, 1982, the channel launched a spin-off network called CNN2, which was subsequently renamed Headline News (HLN) the following year in January 1983.

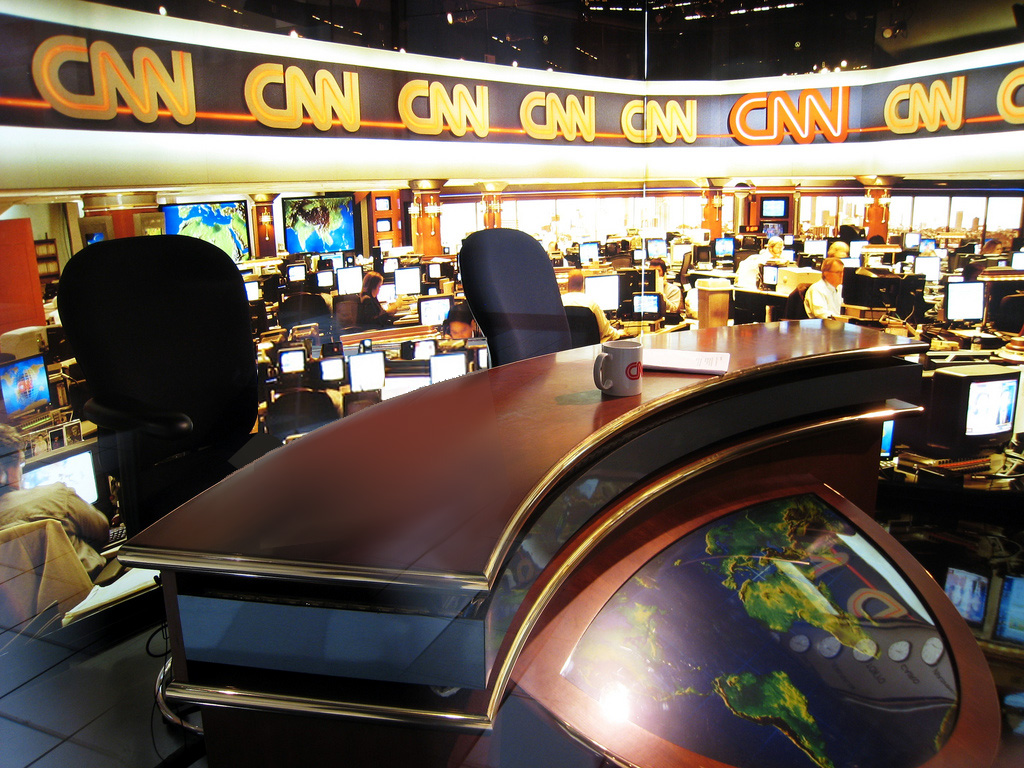
Replica of the newsroom at CNN Center

Whereas CNN featured a mix of newscasts and specialized topical and feature programs, Headline News was originally formatted to strictly focus on rolling news coverage, featuring half-hour newscasts 24 hours a day with segments scheduled in fixed timeslots each half-hour; as such, it was one of the first news channels to utilize a "wheel" schedule. Headline News would scale back its rolling news coverage in February 2005, with the incorporation of personality-based news discussion programs during its nighttime schedule.

Following the launch of CNN, other cable news channels launched in an attempt to capitalize on the channel's growing success, which often had marginal to no success in competing with CNN. One of the first was Satellite News Channel, which launched on June 21, 1982, with a mix of national and regionally focused newscasts; after the channel ceased operations on October 27, 1983, its satellite transponder slot was subsequently purchased by Ted Turner to expand the distribution of Headline News further into additional homes.

After five years, CNN outgrew its original home, a former country club on the outskirts of midtown Atlanta. In 1985, Turner purchased the Omni International complex from its original developer, Atlanta-based real estate mogul Tom Cousins, and moved CNN's headquarters to the building, rechristening the complex as the CNN Center. As Omni International, the complex had never succeeded. Cousins sold it to Turner, along with the Atlanta Hawks NBA franchise. CNN moved into the end of the tower that once housed The World of Sid and Marty Krofft. Turner was instrumental in the revival of Atlanta's downtown. September 1 that year was the launch of CNN International.

=== Original programs ===
==== Moneyline ====
Moneyline premiered in 1980 and was CNN's main financial program for more than 20 years. As the show, hosted by Lou Dobbs, moved more towards general news and economic and political commentary, it was renamed Moneyline with Lou Dobbs, Lou Dobbs Moneyline and then Lou Dobbs Tonight. In 2010, Dobbs – the last remaining original host from the network's launch in 1980 – resigned amid controversy over his questioning of whether President Barack Obama was a native-born U.S. citizen – a qualification for the presidency required under the U.S. Constitution.

==== Evans & Novak ====
The political discussion show Evans and Novak was created in 1980, with Rowland Evans and Robert Novak as its hosts. It became one of the cable network's most-watched discussion programs. Only a short time after, Al Hunt and Mark Shields joined the show as occasional panelists; the name of the program was eventually changed to Evans, Novak, Hunt & Shields in 1998 when Hunt and Shields were named as permanent members of the show.

==== Crossfire ====
In June 1982, the channel launched a late night political debate program, Crossfire, which featured discussions on political issues from opposing viewpoints; it was hosted by liberal Tom Braden and conservative Pat Buchanan. The idea of the program came about when Braden and Buchanan debated on a daily radio show in 1978. The show soon became popular and was moved to a primetime slot. In 1985, Buchanan left the show to become the communications director for the Ronald Reagan presidential administration. He was replaced by conservative columnist Robert Novak, who had already co-hosted another political program on CNN, Evans & Novak and was also a regular on The McLaughlin Group at the time. Buchanan returned to the show in 1987, replacing Novak. In 1989, Braden was replaced by Michael Kinsley, a liberal columnist for Time, and magazine editor for The New Republic.

==== Larry King Live ====
In June 1985, CNN launched a primetime interview show hosted by Larry King. Larry King Live featured interviews with one or more prominent individuals, mainly celebrities, politicians and businesspeople. The show became the longest-running program on CNN, lasting for 25 years until King's retirement from the network in 2010. It was the highest-rated news show on television until 2000, when The O'Reilly Factor on rival Fox News Channel surpassed Larry King Live in the ratings.

Unlike many interviewers, Larry King had a direct, non-confrontational approach. His interview style was characteristically frank, but with occasional bursts of irreverence and humor. His approach attracted some guests who would not otherwise appear. King, who was known for his general lack of pre-interview preparation, once bragged that he never pre-read the books of authors who appeared on his show. Critics have claimed that Larry King asked "soft" questions in comparison to other interviewers, which allowed him to reach guests who would be averse to interviewing on "tough" talk shows.

On February 24, 1987, King suffered a major heart attack and had to undergo a quintuple-bypass surgery. It was a life-altering event as previously, smoking was one of his trademarks and he was unashamed of his addiction. King was a three-pack-a-day smoker and kept a lit cigarette during his interviews, so he would not have to take time to light up during breaks. After the incident, he encouraged curbing smoking to reduce the risk of cardiovascular disease.

==== Variety shows ====
- Sports Tonight (1980–2001)
- People in the News
- Style with Elsa Klensch (1980–2000)
- Business Morning
- CNN Daybreak (1980–2005)

=== Early coverage ===
==== Space Shuttle Challenger disaster ====
On January 28, 1986, CNN was the only TV network news to provide live coverage of the launch of the Space Shuttle Challenger to the public. However, NASA TV provided the live coverage to schools nationwide, and HBO (Home Box Office) carried the live feed without commentary as well (before its normal broadcast, at that time, of films beginning in the late afternoon). The Space Shuttle Challenger abruptly disintegrated just 73 seconds after lift-off. Seven astronauts, including schoolteacher Christa McAuliffe, were killed in the disaster.

Then President Ronald Reagan postponed the State of the Union Address that evening. He addressed the nation in the time of tragedy and grief from the Oval Office. On January 31, 1986, two days after the tragedy, CNN provided live coverage of the memorial service for the Challenger crew members at Johnson Space Center in Houston, Texas.

==== Baby Jessica rescue ====
On October 14, 1987, 18-month-old toddler Jessica McClure fell down a well in Midland, Texas. CNN quickly reported on the story, and the event helped make its name. New York Times columnist Lisa Belkin wrote a retrospective article in 1995 on the impact of live video news:

If a picture is worth a thousand words, then a moving picture is worth many times that, and a live moving picture makes an emotional connection that goes deeper than logic and lasts well beyond the actual event ... This was before correspondents reported live from the enemy capital while American bombs were falling. Before Saddam Hussein held a surreal press conference with a few of the hundreds of Americans he was holding hostage. Before the nation watched, riveted but powerless, as Los Angeles was looted and burned. Before O. J. Simpson took a slow ride in a white Bronco, and before everyone close to his case had an agent and a book contract. This was uncharted territory just a short time ago.

== 1990–2001: Leadership under Tom Johnson ==
In 1990, Tom Johnson, who formerly served as publisher of the Los Angeles Times for 13 years, was named as the president of CNN.

Under Johnson, CNN expanded its reach with the launches of a number of cable and satellite television networks, both domestic and internationally. Two specialized closed-circuit networks launched in 1991: CNN Airport Network, which provides a mix of original content and simulcasts of CNN International to national and world airports; and CNN Checkout Channel, a customized channel made available to grocery stores which shut down in 1993. 1996 saw the debuts of two specialty news channels: CNNSI, a sports news channel created in partnership with co-owned magazine Sports Illustrated, and CNNfn, a business news channel created as a competitor to CNBC (CNNSI shut down in 2002, while CNNfn shut down in December 2004; CNN continues to maintain a partnership with Sports Illustrated through CNNSI.com).

CNN launched its website, CNN.com (initially an experiment known as CNN Interactive), on August 30, 1995, which grew to become one of the most popular news websites in the world. Several specialty websites were launched in later years such as CNNMoney, created in partnership with fellow co-owned magazine Money; CNN also launched a radio network that provided news updates and other content to radio stations nationwide. The network grew to include 36 bureaus (10 domestic, 26 international), and expanded its broadcast partnerships to more than 900 affiliated local stations (which also receive news and features content via the affiliate video service CNN Newsource). CNN's success made a bona-fide mogul of founder Ted Turner and set the stage for multimedia conglomerate Time Warner's eventual acquisition of the Turner Broadcasting System in 1996.

=== Coverage of the Gulf War ===
The first Persian Gulf War in 1991 was a watershed event for CNN that catapulted the network past the "big three" American networks for the first time in its history, largely due to an unprecedented, historical scoop: CNN was the only news outlet with the ability to communicate from inside Iraq during the initial hours of the American bombing campaign, with live reports from the al-Rashid Hotel in Baghdad by reporters Bernard Shaw, John Holliman, and Peter Arnett.

The moment when bombing began was announced on CNN by Bernard Shaw on January 16, 1991, as follows:

This is Bernie Shaw. Something is happening outside. ... Peter Arnett, join me here. Let's describe to our viewers what we're seeing ... The skies over Baghdad have been illuminated. ... We're seeing bright flashes going off all over the sky.

The Gulf War experience brought CNN some much sought-after legitimacy and made household names of previously obscure, low-paid reporters. Many of these reporters now comprise CNN's "old guard." Bernard Shaw became CNN's chief anchor until his retirement in 2001. Others include then-Pentagon correspondent Wolf Blitzer (now host of The Situation Room) and international correspondent Christiane Amanpour. Amanpour's presence in Iraq was caricatured by actress Nora Dunn in the role of the ruthless reporter Adriana Cruz in the 1999 film Three Kings. Fellow Time Warner-owned network HBO later produced a television movie, Live from Baghdad, about CNN's coverage of the first Gulf War.

CNN was criticized for excessively pushing 'human interest' stories and avoiding depictions of violent images; the result of all this being an alleged 'propagandistic' presentation of news. A report by Fairness and Accuracy in Reporting quotes an unnamed CNN reporter as describing "the 'sweet beautiful sight' of bombers taking off from Saudi Arabia."

=== The CNN effect ===
Coverage of the first Gulf War and other crises of the early 1990s (particularly the infamous Battle of Mogadishu) led officials at the Pentagon to coin the term "the CNN effect" to describe the perceived impact of real time, 24-hour news coverage on the decision-making processes of the American government.

John Kiesewetter explained:

CNN has changed news. Before CNN, events were reported in two cycles, for morning and evening newspapers and newscasts. Now news knows no cycle. When a plane has crashed, or shots are fired in school, we expect to see it immediately on all-news channels. We don't depend on the Big Three broadcast networks. The turning point came shortly after CNN's 10th birthday, when Bernard Shaw, Peter Arnett and John Holliman provided play-by-play of the 1991 Gulf War from a Baghdad hotel. The Gulf war proved how CNN had changed the world. U.S. military leaders chose their words carefully during televised press briefings, knowing that Sadam Hussein was watching CNN, too.

=== Shows created ===
==== Both Sides with Jesse Jackson ====
Both Sides with Jesse Jackson was a political talk show, hosted by civil rights leader and two-time presidential candidate Jesse Jackson, that aired on Sundays. Each program began with a short taped report on the topic being discussed in that week's edition by CNN correspondent John Bisney. The show ran from 1992 to 2000.

==== Capital Gang ====
Capital Gang is one of cable news' longest-running programs; running from 1988 to 2005 on Saturday nights, it featured discussions of the week's political news stories. The original panelists were Pat Buchanan, Al Hunt, Mark Shields and Robert Novak. When Buchanan left the network to run for president, Margaret Warner, Mona Charen, and later Margaret Carlson and Kate O'Beirne became regular panelists.

==== Burden of Proof ====
Burden of Proof was a show that discussed legal issues of the day, hosted by Greta Van Susteren and Roger Cossack. It debuted in 1995 and was canceled in 2001. The show was developed by CNN Executive Vice-president Gail Evans.

==== TalkBack Live ====
TalkBack Live is a daytime talk show that aired on CNN from 1994 to 2003. The hour-long program, which was broadcast from the first floor of CNN Center and aired at 3:00 p.m. Eastern Time each weekday, allowed questions and comments from audience members and calls from viewers. It was hosted at various times by Susan Rook, Bobbie Battista, Karyn Bryant and Arthel Neville.

=== End of the monopoly ===
In 1996, CNN received its first major competitors with the launch of MSNBC, originally a joint venture between NBC and Microsoft, and News Corporation's Fox News Channel; despite this, CNN remained #1 in the ratings among the cable news channels and Larry King Live remained its most-watched news show.

In 1998, CNN, in partnership with corporate sister Time magazine, ran a report that Operation Tailwind in 1970 in Vietnam included use of Sarin gas to kill a group of defectors from the United States military. The Pentagon denied the story. Skeptics deemed it improbable that such an extraordinary and risky atrocity could have gone unnoticed at the height of the Vietnam War's unpopularity. CNN, after a two-week inquiry, issued a retraction.

== 2001–2007: Restarting business ==
In 2000 and 2001, CNN hired many key people such as Anderson Cooper, Aaron Brown, Paula Zahn and (rehired) Lou Dobbs. The leadership of the network also changed. Kaplan left CNN in 2000, and moreover Tom Johnson retired as head of CNN in 2001 after 10 years. Following his retirement, new management and increased competition from Fox News Channel led to the network's gradual decline during the decade.

=== New shows ===
==== NewsNight with Aaron Brown ====
Created in 2001, NewsNight with Aaron Brown focused on investigative journalism and had a strong emphasis on interviews. The program included segments such as "The Whip" (which quickly previewed segments from four reporters at large), "On The Rise" and "Segment 7". The Morning Papers segment, known as "The Rooster", featured a brief preview of compelling or interesting headlines from the next day's newspapers around the world. The segment concluded with the weather forecast for Chicago as provided in the Chicago Sun-Times. Newsnight was cancelled on November 5, 2005, and Brown resigned from CNN shortly afterward.

==== Paula Zahn Now ====
The primetime show that aired in the timeslot preceding Larry King Live, Paula Zahn Now, which debuted in 2003, was never very popular. It competed against Fox News Channel's The O'Reilly Factor, which had grown to become the highest-rated cable news program. The program lasted for four years before being cancelled on August 2, 2007.

==== Connie Chung Tonight ====
Launched in 2002, Connie Chung Tonight was a short-lived news and interview show, hosted by Connie Chung, that was canceled after one year on the air.

==== The Point w/Greta Van Susteren ====
Greta Van Susteren, who had been with CNN as a correspondent for over a decade, began hosting her own primetime news and interview show in 2001, called The Point; the program was canceled after a year, with Van Susteren joining Fox News Channel shortly afterward.

==== The Spin Room ====
The Spin Room, a half-hour debate show that aired in the 10:30 p.m. Eastern Time slot, debuted in 2000 and was hosted by Tucker Carlson and Bill Press; the program was canceled after a few months and replaced by Greenfield at Large.

==== Greenfield at Large ====
Launched in 2001 and hosted by Jeff Greenfield, Greenfield at Large, which replaced The Spin Room in the 10:30 p.m. slot, was also short-lived; it was cancelled in 2002 and replaced by NewsNight with Aaron Brown, which was expanded to an hour.

=== Coverage ===
==== 9/11 attacks and War in Afghanistan ====
CNN was the first major network to break the news of the September 11 attacks in 2001. Anchor Carol Lin was on the air to deliver the first public report of the event. She broke into a commercial at 8:49 a.m. Eastern Time and said:

This just in. You are looking at obviously a very disturbing live shot there. That is the World Trade Center, and we have unconfirmed reports this morning that a plane has crashed into one of the towers of the World Trade Center. CNN Center right now is just beginning to work on this story, obviously calling our sources and trying to figure out exactly what happened, but clearly something relatively devastating happening this morning there on the south end of the island of Manhattan. That is once again, a picture of one of the towers of the World Trade Center.

Sean Murtagh, CNN vice president for finance and administration, was the first network employee on the air in New York City. Coincidentally, Paula Zahn, who assisted in the coverage, began working as a CNN reporter on the day that the attacks occurred (Zahn mentioned this fact on a 2005 episode of Jeopardy!, in which she appeared as a guest clue presenter). Daryn Kagan and Leon Harris were live on the air just after 9:00 a.m. Eastern Time as the second plane hit the South Tower of the World Trade Center and through an interview with CNN correspondent David Ensor, reported the news that U.S. officials determined "that this is a terrorist act". Later, Aaron Brown and Judy Woodruff anchored through the day and night as the attacks unfolded, winning an Edward R. Murrow award for the network. Brown had just joined CNN from ABC to serve as the breaking news anchor.

Amongst the criticisms levied against CNN, as well as the other major U.S. news channels, is the charge that CNN took a lenient approach to the Bush administration, particularly after 9/11 and during the start of the War in Afghanistan. At the 2002 Newsworld Asia conference held in Singapore, the executive vice-president and general manager of CNN International, was quoted as saying: "Anyone who claims the US media didn't censor itself is kidding you. It wasn't a matter of government pressure but a reluctance to criticize anything in a war that was obviously supported by the vast majority of the people. And this isn't just a CNN issue – every journalist who was in any way involved in 9/11 is partly responsible."

==== Iraq War ====
In April 2003, Eason Jordan, chief news executive at CNN, wrote an op-ed piece in The New York Times stating that he had lobbied the Iraqi government for 12 years in order to maintain a CNN presence in Iraq. He also admitted to withholding what would be considered newsworthy information of the government's atrocities, citing fears that releasing news would potentially endanger the lives of Iraqis working for CNN in Baghdad, some of whom had already been subject to beatings and torture. Critics take particularly strong exception to the handling of the Bush administration's rhetoric leading up to the 2003 invasion of Iraq. Veteran CNN reporter Christiane Amanpour characterized the behavior of the news media as "self-muzzling" and as "cheerleaders for the Bush war drive against Iraq". An editorial in the German publication Süddeutsche Zeitung compared CNN's war coverage to "live coverage of the Super Bowl", and the Qatar-based Al-Jazeera news network has criticized CNN for portraying U.S. soldiers as heroes.

== 2007–2017: Partnering events ==
=== 2008 U.S. election ===
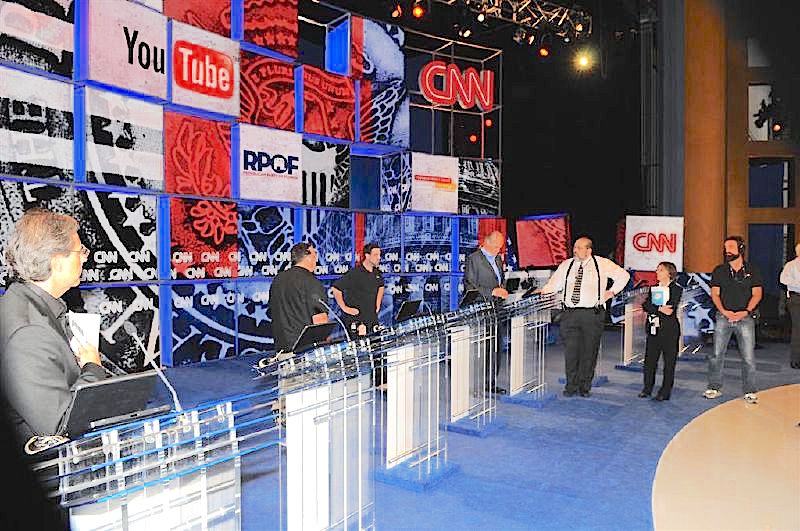
The stage for the second 2008 CNN/YouTube presidential debate

Leading up to the 2008 U.S. presidential election, CNN devoted large amounts of its coverage to politics, including hosting candidate debates during the Democratic and Republican primary seasons. On June 3 and 5, 2007, CNN teamed up with Saint Anselm College to sponsor the New Hampshire Republican and Democratic Debates. Later that year, the channel hosted the first CNN/YouTube presidential debates, a non-traditional format where viewers were invited to pre-submit questions over the internet via the YouTube video-sharing service. In 2008, CNN partnered with the Los Angeles Times to host two primary debates leading up to its coverage of Super Tuesday. CNN's debate and election night coverage led to its highest ratings of the year, with January 2008 viewership averaging 1.1 million viewers, a 41% increase over the previous year.

=== 2016 U.S. election ===
Driven by live coverage of the year's U.S. presidential election, 2016 was CNN's most-watched year in its history. Throughout the campaign, the network aired unedited coverage of many of the Trump campaign rallies. Aides for Republican candidates Marco Rubio, Jeb Bush, and Ted Cruz accused CNN President Jeff Zucker of undermining their candidates during the Republican primaries. After the election, Zucker acknowledged that it was a mistake to air so many of the campaign rallies. CNN also drew criticism during the election for hiring former Trump campaign manager Corey Lewandowski, who was still being paid by and was effectively working on behalf of the campaign.

=== Political subject controversies ===
The presidency of Donald Trump led to many prominent controversies involving CNN. Critics have accused the network of excessive coverage of Donald Trump and Democratic candidate Hillary Clinton. CNN president Jeff Zucker defended CNN against the criticism, commenting that Trump was the most willing Republican candidate to give on-air interviews. Trump's response to the allegations during his speech at the 2017 Conservative Political Action Conference (CPAC), jokingly referring to CNN as the "Clinton News Network."

On June 26, 2017, CNN investigative journalists Thomas Frank, Eric Lichtblau, and Lex Haris resigned after the network retracted an online article that incorrectly connected Trump aide Anthony Scaramucci to a $10 billion Russian investment fund. The network apologized to Scaramucci and admitted that the online story did not meet its editorial standards. Zucker responded by stressing that the network needs to "play error-free ball" regarding future stories about Trump.

In July 2017, Trump posted a video on Twitter of himself tackling Vince McMahon on the ground during WrestleMania 23, edited to replace McMahon's face with the CNN logo. Trump's criticism of mainstream media outlets could have encouraged right-wing supporters to commit violence against journalists. CNN also faced criticism over an investigation that identified the Reddit user (r/The_Donald) who had allegedly created the video, facing accusations that they had blackmailed the user.

== 2018–present: New ownerships and expansion ==
=== 2018–2022: WarnerMedia ===
Later that month, a group of Democratic senators, led by Amy Klobuchar, issued a request for information over allegations that the Trump administration was planning to use CNN as "leverage for political gain" in the process of clearing the proposed acquisition of its parent company Time Warner by AT&T—a purchase which was first announced in October 2016. The Daily Caller reported that, in particular, the administration was seeking the removal of Jeff Zucker as CNN president. Although Trump had promised to block the acquisition entirely during his presidential campaign, Trump's transition team later stated that the government planned to evaluate the deal without prejudice.

Following the announcement of the acquisition, AT&T CEO Randall L. Stephenson stated that the company was "committed to continuing the editorial independence of CNN". In August 2017, Deadline Hollywood reported that AT&T had considered spinning off CNN and its stake in TMZ post-acquisition. In October 2017, Stephenson downplayed the possibility that the ongoing tensions between Trump and CNN could affect the deal, stating that he "[didn't] know what the relevance of CNN is in terms of an antitrust review", and that AT&T did not plan to make managerial changes to Time Warner properties that were operating well, such as CNN.

On November 6, 2017, Stephenson met with Makan Delrahim, assistant Attorney General of the U.S. Department of Justice Antitrust Division, to discuss antitrust and concentration of media ownership concerns surrounding the acquisition, and possible options for satisfying them. Two days later, major media outlets publicly reported that the Justice Department had recommended that either the entire Turner Broadcasting System unit, or DirecTV, be divested as a condition of the merger. The Financial Times went further, stating that it had specifically demanded the divestment of CNN.

At the DealBook conference in New York City the next day, Stephenson denied that the department had demanded the divestment of CNN at all (stating that he had "never been told that the price of getting the deal done was selling CNN"), and that the company aimed to "get to a negotiated settlement". However, he stated that if they were unable to do so, AT&T was "prepared to litigate". In a statement to CNBC, a Department of Justice official backed Stephenson, denying that there were any specific demands to divest CNN during the discussion, and considering the claims to be "shocking" and an attempt to politicize the situation. The official added that the department had officially recommended either abandoning the deal entirely, or divesting DirecTV or Turner, but that it was open to other options for quelling antitrust concerns. The same day, the watchdog group Protect Democracy sued the Department of Justice to seek information on whether the Trump administration had "improperly interfered with the Department's review of the merger between AT&T and Time Warner, or has acted in that matter based on the President's personal dislike of CNN's protected speech." The group had issued a Freedom of Information Act request for these details, but the department had not responded. On November 20, 2017, the Department of Justice filed an antitrust lawsuit over the acquisition.

After District of Columbia U.S. District Court judge Richard J. Leon ruled in favor of AT&T in the lawsuit, AT&T completed its acquisition of Time Warner on June 14, 2018, and renamed the company WarnerMedia.

In March 2019, WarnerMedia announced a reorganization that effectively dissolved Turner Broadcasting, and CNN became part of the new WarnerMedia News & Sports division. Jeff Zucker was named head of the new division, which added Turner Sports and the AT&T SportsNet regional sports networks to his remit.

On May 6, 2019, CNN began to broadcast programming from its new studios at 30 Hudson Yards, which succeeded the Time Warner Center as the network's Manhattan headquarters. Meanwhile, in late May 2019, CNN International announced it was reducing its programming and staff based in London to reduce costs, citing losses of $10 million per-year.

In May 2021, AT&T announced that it would divest WarnerMedia, and that it would subsequently merge with Discovery Inc. to form Warner Bros. Discovery, pending shareholder and regulatory approval.

=== 2022–present: Warner Bros. Discovery ===
In July 2021, CNN announced it would launch a subscription streaming service, CNN+, in the United States during the first quarter of 2022, which would feature original programming and an on-demand library of CNN original series and documentaries. In December 2021, CNN hired long-time Fox News journalist Chris Wallace to host a program on the service. CNN+ would launch on March 28, 2022, shortly before the completion of the WarnerMedia/Discovery merger.

After a dismal launch (with CNBC estimating only around 10,000 average daily users), CNN announced on April 21 that CNN+ would be shut down at the end of the month. Both Warner Bros. Discovery's head of Global Streaming & Interactive Entertainment J.B. Perrette, and new CNN head Chris Licht (who replaced the outgoing Jeff Zucker) stated that the service was incompatible with the company's goal of having a single streaming service to cover all of its brands—which would include a future merger of Discovery+ and HBO Max. Perrette stated that the situation was "avoidable", but that the existing leadership (which were unable to discuss plans with Discovery's executives until the completion of the merger for legal restrictions) had gone on with the launch despite the pending merger.

During the WBD upfronts in May, Licht argued that "extremes are dominating cable news", and that he planned for CNN to "challenge the traditional philosophy of cable news"—indicating that the network planned to lean back towards its roots as a hard news outlet. He also announced plans to introduce a new morning show that would be a "disruptor [..] in the space", and confirmed that Wallace's CNN+ show, Who's Talking to Chris Wallace?, would move to HBO Max and CNN's Sunday-night lineup. It was later reported that Licht had undertaken the issuance of internal guidance for use of the term "breaking news" on-air, arguing that due to overuse by CNN and others, "its impact has become lost on the audience."

In September 2022, following the sudden departures of veteran White House correspondent John Harwood, chief media correspondent Brian Stelter, and legal pundit Jeffrey Toobin, The Washington Post reported that many CNN staff believed that the new CEO, Chris Licht, was "starting his tenure by casting out voices that had often been critical of former president Donald Trump and his allies, in an effort to present a new, more ideologically neutral CNN", in line with the vision repeatedly expressed by Warner Bros. Discovery CEO David Zaslav, who hired Licht to head up CNN. Critics have accused CNN of shifting to the right. CNN has denied allegations of shifting to the right or center, saying that "We are entirely focused on our core strength and mission – objective journalism, presented in a fair and compelling way. We will continue to acknowledge different worldviews and experiences. We will always stand up for democracy and call out lies – regardless of their origin. That is not centrism, that is journalism."

On September 15, 2022, CNN announced that primetime anchor Don Lemon, daytime anchor Poppy Harlow, and White House correspondent Kaitlan Collins would co-anchor the new CNN morning show, replacing the outgoing New Day. CNN This Morning premiered November 1, 2022.

In October 2022, Licht issued a memo announcing cuts to commissioned and acquired original series and films as a cost savings measure, explaining that "it was based, in large part, on the ever-increasing cost of commissioning third-party premium content. However, I want to be clear that longform content remains an important pillar of our programming." On November 30, Licht announced a series of layoffs as part of cost-cutting measures by Warner Bros. Discovery. In December 2022, it was reported that CNN would relocate its Los Angeles bureau from its long-time home of 6430 Sunset Blvd. to WBD's offices in Burbank, California.

In January 2023, Licht announced plans to revamp parts of CNN's daytime rolling news lineup with a new format; the new program, CNN News Central, premiered in April 2023, replacing the weekday editions of CNN Newsroom, with the morning edition featuring John Berman, Kate Bolduan and Sara Sidner anchoring from New York City, while the afternoon edition would feature Jim Sciutto, Brianna Keilar, and Boris Sanchez anchoring from Washington D.C. In May 2023, in response to backlash over CNN hosting a town hall featuring former president Donald Trump, Zaslav stated that "Republicans are back on the air" and that CNN was repositioning itself to be a network that focused on "both sides of every issue".

Licht was fired as CNN's president and CEO in June 2023, after an article in The Atlantic revealed that employees had become unhappy with him over actions taken during his tenure. In August 2023, Mark Thompson was hired as chief executive and chairman. On February 5, 2024, Thompson cancelled CNN This Morning, repurposing the branding for its early-morning newscast Early Start, and moving CNN News Central into its timeslot.

==== Paywall and premium content strategies ====
In July 2024, Thompson announced layoffs of approximately 100 employees as part of his strategy to consolidate and integrate CNN's television and digital newsrooms, and increase cooperation between its U.S. and international news departments. He also announced plans to widen CNN's digital video operations, including plans to launch CNN Originals and CNN en Español free ad-supported streaming television (FAST) channels, increase the involvement of CNN television personalities in video content, and introduce a "TV Futures Lab" to develop programming for Max. Plans were also announced for future subscription offerings on CNN.com, with Thompson adding that the company was "assessing existing areas of digital strength like consumer advice with CNN Underscored and health".

On September 3, 2024, CNN announced it had rehired Brian Stelter as chief media analyst, two years after his departure, and again writing the newsletter for Reliable Sources, following the exit of Oliver Darcy.

CNN's website launched a paywall on October 1, 2024, offering reduced advertising, and exclusive political coverage and documentaries. The paywall is intended to take effect after readers access a limited number of articles before being prompted to pay. The site had previously tested a "registration wall", which required readers to provide their email address for access to further content after a few articles every month. Journalists from The Verge and The New York Times, whose former chief executive Mark Thompson now leads CNN, noted that the collection of email addresses became the groundwork for marketing of CNN's digital paywall later that year.

On January 23, 2025, Thompson announced further layoffs of around 200 employees as part of his ongoing digital strategy. In addition, he revealed continued plans for a major pivot towards video, a "lifestyle-oriented digital product", and a new streaming service. The same day, CNN also announced a major realignment of its schedule that was expected to take effect within the next few weeks, with the new 5 a.m. show 5 Things with Rahel Solomon, CNN This Morning with new anchor Audie Cornish, The Situation Room moved to a morning timeslot with Pamela Brown as a co-anchor, Kasie Hunt moving to the new 4 p.m. show The Arena with Kasie Hunt, and The Lead moved up into The Situation Room's former timeslot. On January 28, 2025, Jim Acosta —whose hour of Newsroom was cut as part of the new lineup—announced his immediate departure from CNN; Acosta had reportedly declined a move to a proposed late-night program based out of Los Angeles. Most of the new programming premiered on March 3, while Solomon's new program—which had since been retitled Early Start (the former branding of the current CNN This Morning), would premiere on March 10.

Details on the new streaming product were revealed in May 2025, with the service planned to be branded as simply "CNN" and available via both over-the-top and TV Everywhere models. On September 11, 2025, CNN announced that it had hired former KTTV anchor Elex Michaelson to host its new Los Angeles-based program, later announced as The Story Is with Elex Michaelson, which premiered on October 27. The acquisition deal was closed on October 6, 2026.

==== Paramount Skydance–WBD merger ====
In mid-2025, WBD announced plans to split into two separate companies, with its studios and streaming businesses continuing as simply Warner Bros., and its linear television assets—including CNN—being spun out as Discovery Global. However, in October 2025, Paramount Skydance began to make unsolicited offers to acquire the entirety of the company instead, and entered into a bidding war with Netflix, Inc. (which had made an official offer to acquire just the studios portion of the company) in December 2025. In February 2026, WBD ultimately accepted an offer to be acquired by Paramount Skydance for $110 billion.

The merger led to concerns from CNN staff over how the network would operate post-merger; The Wall Street Journal had reported that Paramount Skydance CEO David Ellison had given assurances to president Donald Trump that if Paramount were allowed to buy WBD, he would make "sweeping changes" to CNN. He had previously instituted changes at CBS News to make its coverage lean conservative, including the installation of The Free Press author Bari Weiss as editor-in-chief. In March 2026, Ellison stated that he planned to maintain CNN's editorial independence, explaining that "we absolutely believe in the independence that needs to be maintained obviously for those incredible journalists, and we want to support that going forward." On May 6, 2026, Barry Diller, owner of IAC Inc., expressed interest in potentially buying CNN in response to Paramount's acquisition of WBD, arguing that he wanted to do so "before they ruin it any further. Hopefully, before it's extinct, which, I mean, it's not gonna be."

On August 12, 2026, Paramount Skydance chief legal officer Makan Delrahim commented that the company was keeping all options, including a possible sale of CNN, "on the table" to resolve a California-led lawsuit blocking the merger. The next day, an internal source told The Wrap that Paramount Skydance had no intention to sell CNN.

==== Christiane Amanpour's second departure ====
On October 19, 2026, CNN's longest-serving veteran Christiane Amanpour announced that she would be leaving the network for the second time and permanently, sometime in June 2027. In November 2026, Warner Bros. Discovery Global Linear Networks was folded into Paramount Media Networks, which was renamed to Skydance Global Cable Media.
