= Gail Evans =

American author, lecturer, and business executive

- Born: Gail Hirschorn; December 17, 1941 (age 84); New York City
- Education: Bennington College
- Occupations: Lecturer, author, journalist
- Known for: Author, senior executive at CNN
- Spouse: Robert Evans (div. 2000)
- Children: 3

Gail Hirschorn Evans (born 17 December 1941) is an American author, lecturer, and business executive. She is known for being the highest ranking female executive at Cable News Network and for her two books, Play Like a Man, Win Like a Woman and She Wins, You Win.

== Early life ==
Evans was born on 17 December 1941 and received a bachelor's degree from Bennington College. Her first job was at the office of The Honorable William Fitts Ryan (D-NY). She later served as legislative and executive assistant to Sen. Harrison Arlington Williams of New Jersey. During the Johnson administration she served in Office of the Special Counsel to the President where she worked on the creation of the Presidents Committee on Equal Employment Opportunity and the 1965 Civil Rights Act. She later moved to the Import Export Bank when Hobart Taylor became president of the Bank. Lyndon B. Johnson Administration.

== CNN ==
Evans began working at CNN at its inception in 1980. By the time she retired in 2001, she was executive vice president of the CNN Newsgroup. During that time she was responsible for program and talent development at all of CNN’s domestic networks overseeing national and international talk shows and the Network Guest Bookings Department, which scheduled about 25,000 guests each year. She is responsible for developing many of CNN’s talk shows including Crossfire, Burden of Proof, Talkback Live, Capital Gang and Crier & Co.

She is credited with helping to discover and guide the careers of Katie Couric and Greta Van Susteren.

== Post-CNN Career ==
Her book Play Like a Man, Win Like a Woman came out in September, 2001 and reached the top 10 on the New York Times bestseller list and being translated into 21 different languages. Following an appearance on Larry King Live, Evans' book spiked as high as #3 on Amazon.com's bestseller list.

In 2003, Evans wrote a follow-up, She Wins, You Win. Though not as much of a commercial success, the second book got strong reviews. Publishers Weekly described it as, "an aggressive but motivating handbook for women who are serious about career success."

Evans is also a corporate speaker and consultant on women in the workplace, giving lectures to AT&T, Johnson & Johnson, GE, Microsoft, JP Morgan, Morgan Stanley, Wells Fargo, KPMG, Cisco, IBM, Thomson Reuters, Deloitte, Intel, and Walmart.

She teaches organizational behavior as it relates to gender, race, and ethnicity at Georgia Tech.

== Personal life ==
Evans is married to former CBS correspondent Bob Evans for more than 30 years before getting divorced in March 2000. They have 3 children and 7 grandchildren.
