= News Central =

News Central may refer to one of the following television news programs:

- News Central (American TV program), hybrid local-national newscast formerly produced by Sinclair Broadcast Group.
- News Central (Philippine TV series), Filipino television newscast.
- CNN News Central, news programming carried by CNN.
