= New Day (TV program) =

Former CNN program

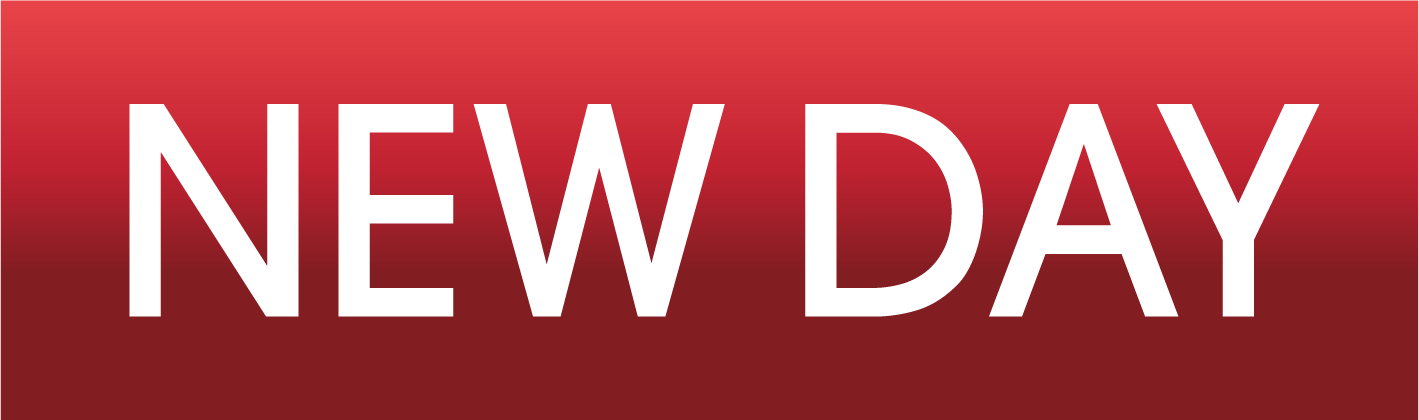
- 2015 logo
- Genre: News; Talk
- Directed by: John Duber
- Presented by: Brianna Keilar; John Berman (weekdays); Boris Sanchez; Amara Walker (weekend)
- Country of origin: United States
- Original language: English

Production
- Executive producer: Javier Morgado
- Production locations: CNN Center; Atlanta; 30 Hudson Yards; New York City; Washington, D.C.
- Camera setup: Multi-camera
- Running time: 180 minutes

Original release
- Network: CNN
- Release: June 17, 2013 – October 31, 2022

Related
- CNN This Morning (2022); Early Start; CNN Today

New Day is an American morning television show that aired on CNN and CNN International from 2013 to 2022. Its weekday editions were co-anchored by John Berman since 2018 and Brianna Keilar since 2021.

From May 20, 2019 onwards, New Day was broadcast live from CNN's then-new set located in Studio 19Y, at CNN's new base, 30 Hudson Yards, in New York City. Beginning in April 2021, the show was anchored by Keilar at the CNN DC Studios and by Berman at 30 Hudson Yards in New York. The program aired from 6.00 to 9.00 a.m, except on Sundays, when the program finished at 8am.

The program began in June 2013, where it was presented by three anchors: Chris Cuomo, Kate Bolduan and Michaela Pereira. It was broadcast from Time Warner Center. In 2014, Bolduan departed the show and was replaced by Alisyn Camerota, and in 2016 Pereira also left, but was not replaced. Cuomo departed the show in 2018, and was replaced by John Berman. The weekend editions, known respectively as New Day Saturday and New Day Sunday, were co-anchored by Boris Sanchez since 2021 and Amara Walker since 2022, and broadcast from the network's world headquarters at CNN Center in Atlanta, Georgia.

Recurring segments included "The Good Stuff", "Money Time", "Reality Check", "Roll The Tape", "5 Things to Know For Your New Day", "Late Night Laughs", "The Bleacher Report", "The Rock Block", "The E Block", "The Pop 4", and "Around The World".

On September 15, 2022, it was reported that New Day would be replaced with a panel-styled morning news program, hosted by Don Lemon, Poppy Harlow, and Kaitlan Collins. On October 12, it was announced that the show would be titled CNN This Morning and premiere November 1.

== Background ==
New Day premiered on June 17, 2013, and aired from 6:00-9:00 a.m. ET (5:00-9:00 a.m. ET during breaking news events), originating from CNN's New York City studios, which at the time were based at Time Warner Center. New Day replaced Starting Point, formerly anchored by Soledad O'Brien, which had aired since January 2, 2012.

Chris Cuomo joined CNN from ABC News in January 2013. Michaela Pereira joined CNN from Los Angeles' KTLA in May 2013. Former Good Morning America and CBS Evening News executive producer Jim Murphy was senior executive producer from launch until 2017. Izzy Povich has taken over as morning VP. Javier Morgado is the executive producer. Pereira departed the show on April 29, 2016, and anchored a live, two-hour daytime news program on CNN's sister channel HLN, which began in July 2016. She left HLN in October 2018.

From 2013 to 2019, the New Day set was located in Studio 71 at Time Warner Center, and consisted of a red/orange-colored faux brick background, highlighted by spot lighting, with inset LCD panels, glass-fronted cubicles, and a glass-topped desk on a central podium. It was designed by multiple Emmy Award-winning design agency, Jack Morton PDG, (part of Jack Morton Worldwide), which has also designed the studio sets for The View on ABC, The Late Show with Stephen Colbert on CBS, The Daily Show on Comedy Central and Last Week Tonight with John Oliver on HBO.

== CNN International simulcasts ==
In 2017, CNN International began simulcasting the first hour of the weekday edition and in 2019, as part of cutbacks to CNN International in London to reduce costs, the second hour of New Day began to be shown.

In April 2020, due to the outbreak of the COVID-19 pandemic, all three hours began to be seen globally, and for the first time the weekend editions also began to be shown on CNNI. However, later in the year, the final 30 minutes of the weekday edition and the first hour of the weekend editions were no longer seen by international viewers. As of 2022, the final hour of the weekday edition was no longer aired on CNNI.

== Reviews ==
Mediaite ranked New Day as the best morning cable news show of 2018, saying Avlon's "Reality Check" segment was "a winning addition to the show — his comprehensive fact-check segments are a standout, and a welcome feature on television in a current era lacking in reality-based news coverage."

== Notable on-air staff ==
=== Weekday edition ===
- Brianna Keilar, anchor (2021–2022)
- John Berman, anchor (2018–2022)
- John Avlon, commentator
- Chris Cuomo, anchor (2013–2018)
- Kate Bolduan, anchor (2013–2014)
- Alisyn Camerota, anchor (2014–2021)
- Michaela Pereira, news anchor (2013–2016)
- Indra Petersons, on-air meteorologist (2013–2014)

=== Weekend edition ===
- Boris Sanchez, weekend anchor (2021–2022; now on CNN NewsCentral)
- Amara Walker weekend anchor (2022; later on CNN This Morning Weekend)
- Victor Blackwell, weekend anchor (2013–2021)
- Christi Paul, weekend anchor (2013–2022)

Preceded by Early Start	CNN Weekday lineup 6:00 am – 9:00 am	Succeeded by CNN Newsroom
