= List of Belgian Americans =

This is a list of notable Belgian-Americans, including Americans of Belgian descent, Americans born in Belgium, Belgians who took American citizenship, Belgians born in the United States, and Belgians who lived for a considerable period of time in the United States. All would describe themselves as Belgian-Americans. A brief biography beside each entry helps to clarify in which of these categories each individual falls.

To be included in this list, the person must have a Wikipedia article showing they are Belgian American or must have references showing they are Belgian American and are notable.

== Artists ==
- Ted LeFevre (1964–), theatrical set designer
- Jan Yoors (1922–1977), Flemish-American artist
- Tony Mafia (1931–1999), American-Belgian painter, sculptor, and singer-songwriter whose work combined expressionist, surrealist, and symbolic themes.

== Builders ==
- George Washington Goethals (1858–1928), Brooklyn-born son of Belgian immigrants. Goethals was the first recorded Belgian-American graduate of West Point (where he is buried) and was appointed by Theodore Roosevelt to build the Panama Canal, which he accomplished under budget in 1914.

== Business people ==
- Henry Ford (1863–1947), Industrialist and business magnate; mother was an orphan born to Belgian immigrants adopted by Irish-American neighbors
- Carl Karcher, founder of the Carl's Jr. hamburger chain
- Prosper Lamal, 19th century entrepreneur who started the practice of using blue street tiles in New Orleans
- Maurice Tempelsman (1929–2025), born in Antwerp; his family moved to New York City in 1940 to escape persecution by Nazi Germany during World War II; a diamond merchant who was the longtime companion to Jacqueline Kennedy Onassis, former First Lady of the United States
- William vanden Heuvel (1930–2021), businessman and diplomat

== Entertainers ==
- Johnny Crawford (1946–2021), actor; maternal grandparents were Belgian
- Robert L. Crawford Jr. (1944–), actor; maternal grandparents were Belgian
- Cameron Douglas (1978–), actor; father of partial Belgian descent and son of Michael Douglas
- Michael Douglas (1944–), actor and producer; mother of partial Belgian descent
- Robert Duvall (1931–2026), actor and filmmaker
- Jorja Fox (1968–), actress
- Marianne Hagan (1966–), actress
- Henry Hathaway (1898–1985), film director and producer; born Henri Léopold de Fiennes; by right a Belgian marquis, a hereditary title held by his paternal grandfather, who had been charged by his King Leopold I of Belgium to acquire the Sandwich (Hawaiian) Islands for Belgium; failing to do so, he settled in San Francisco instead of returning home.
- David Hayter (1969–), actor and voice actor
- Bonnie Hunt (1961–), actress and voice actress
- JAF (1930–2005), cartoonist
- Simon Nuchtern (1936–), filmmaker
- America Olivo (1978–), actress, singer, and model; mother of partial Belgian descent
- Frank Oz (1944–), actor, puppeteer, director, and producer; Belgian mother
- Audrina Patridge (1985–), actress, model
- Ben Pronsky (1978–), actor and voice actor
- Drew Van Acker (1986–), actor
- Chiara Aurelia (2002–), actress, Belgian father

== Fashion ==
- Liz Claiborne (1929–2007), Belgian-born fashion designer
- Diane von Fürstenberg (1946–), Belgian fashion designer based in New York

== Inventors ==
- Leo Hendrik Baekeland (1863–1944), Belgium-born American chemist who invented Velox photographic paper (1893) and Bakelite (1907), an inexpensive, nonflammable, versatile, and popular plastic; in 1978, he was inducted into the National Inventors Hall of Fame.
- Charles Joseph Van Depoele (1846–1892), electrical engineer, inventor, and pioneer in electric railway technology

== Journalists ==
- Kate Bolduan (July 28, 1983–), television Journalist and News Anchor for CNN

== Musicians ==
- Dirk Verbeuren (1975–), Belgian-born drummer
- Evelyne Brancart (1954–), Belgian-born pianist
- Pierre D'Archambeau (1927–2014), Swiss-born violinist; Belgian parents
- Désiré Defauw (1885–1960), Belgian-born violinist and conductor
- G-Eazy (1989–), rapper
- Frédérique Petrides née Frédérique Mayer (1903–1983), Belgian-American conductor
- Jean-Baptiste "Toots" Thielemans (1922–2016), Belgian jazz artist

== Politicians ==
- Bob Beauprez (1948–), member of the United States House of Representatives
- Charles Benedict Calvert (1808–1864), U.S. Congressman from the sixth district of Maryland, serving one term, 1861—1863; his mother, Rosalie Eugenia Stier, was the daughter of a wealthy Belgian aristocrat, Baron Henri Joseph Stier (1743–1821) and his wife Marie Louise Peeters
- James Carville (1944–), lawyer
- Blake Farenthold (1961–), politician and lobbyist
- Peter Minuit (1589–1638), Belgium-born in the Duchy of Cleves, in present-day Germany; Director-General of the Dutch colony of New Netherland from 1626 until 1633 and founder of the Swedish colony of New Sweden in 1638; by tradition he purchased the island of Manhattan from the Native Americans (Algonquins), on May 24, 1626
- Louis C. Rabaut (1886–1961), Democratic congressman representing Michigan's 14th congressional district
- Francis Rombouts (1631–1691), Mayor of New York City
- Mike Rounds (1954–), United States senator from South Dakota
- Anne-Marie Slaughter (1958–), Director of Policy Planning for the United States Department of State.
- Leon L. Van Autreve (1920–2002), Sergeant Major of the Army

== Prelates ==
- Father Pierre-Jean De Smet (1801–1873), Belgian-born Roman Catholic priest who became the most trusted of the white men among the Native Americans of the Western United States in the mid-19th century
- Louis Hennepin, baptized Father Antoine (1626 – c. 1705), Flemish Catholic priest and missionary of the Franciscan Recollect Order (French: Récollets) and an explorer of the interior of North America; discovered Niagara Falls, Hannibal, Missouri and was the first to place the name 'Chicago' on a map (1683)
- Archbishop Charles John Seghers, the Apostle of Alaska (1839–1886) was consecrated Bishop of Vancouver Island on June 29, 1873. On November 28, 1886, while resting in a deserted cabin in the Alaskan foothills, Bishop Seghers was shot through the heart. His body was borne back to a grief-stricken people and his remains rest under the high altar in the Cathedral at Victoria.
- James Oliver Van de Velde (1795–1855), Belgian-born US Catholic bishop; served as the second Roman Catholic Bishop of Chicago, 1849-1853; in 1853, he was transferred to Natchez, Mississippi and became bishop of the Diocese of Natchez, where he served until his death
- Adrien-Joseph Croquet, born in Braine l'Alleud; sent in 1859 to Oregon; 1860-1898: recorded tribal births, deaths, and confirmations at the Grand Ronde Reservation. His work constitutes the most complete genealogical record
- Henry Gabriels (1838–1921), Belgian-born second Catholic bishop of Ogdensburg, New York (1891-1921). Gabriels Sanatorium opened in 1897, for treatment of Tuberculosis invalids in the Adirondacks. It was named in honor of the Right Rev. Bishop Henry Gabriëls who had urged the Sisters of Mercy to attempt the establishment. It was the first sanatorium in the Adirondacks to admit black patients
- Augustin Van de Vyver (1844–1911), Belgian-born sixth Catholic bishop of Richmond, Virginia (1889-1911)

== Scholars ==
- Francis Deblauwe (1961–), Belgian-American Mesopotamian archaeologist and culture-heritage expert known for the Iraq War & Archaeology project
- George Sarton (1884–1956), seminal Belgian-American polymath and historian of science; father of May Sarton
- Robert Triffin (1911–1993), Belgian-born economist best known for his critique of the Bretton Woods system, later known as Triffin's Dilemma
- Marc Van de Mieroop (1956–), Belgian-American Assyriologist
- Gonda Van Steen (1964–), Belgian-American classical scholar and linguist

== Scientists ==
- Leo Hendrik Baekeland (1863–1944), Belgium-born American chemist who invented Velox photographic paper (1893) and Bakelite (1907), an inexpensive, nonflammable, versatile, and popular plastic; in 1978, he was inducted into the National Inventors Hall of Fame
- Maurice Anthony Biot (1905–1985), Belgian-American physicist and the founder of the theory of poroelasticity
- Karel Bossart (1904–1975), pioneering rocket designer and 'father (creator) of the Atlas ICBM'
- Sylvain Cappell (1946–), Belgian-born mathematician at New York University
- Julius Arthur Nieuwland (1878–1936), Belgian-born Holy Cross priest and professor of chemistry and botany at the University of Notre Dame; known for his contributions to acetylene research and the discovery of synthetic rubber which eventually led to the discovery of Neoprene by DuPont
- Nicolas Ruwet (1932–2001), linguist, literary critic and musical analyst
- Charles Schepens (1912–2006), influential American ophthalmologist, regarded by many in the profession as "the father of modern retinal surgery"
- George Van Biesbroeck (1880–1974), astronomer
- George Washington Goethals (1858–1928), United States army general and civil engineer
- Kevin M. De Cock, Director of the U.S. Centers for Disease Control and Prevention's (CDC) Center for Global Health

== Singers ==
- Vivica Genaux, mezzo-soprano; her Belgian-born father was a biochemistry professor at the University of Alaska
- Brian Molko, lead singer of Placebo; born in Brussels.
- Corey Taylor, lead singer of Slipknot and Stone Sour; of Belgian background from his father's side
- Sharon Van Etten (1981–), singer-songwriter
- Billy Corgan, lead singer of Smashing Pumpkins; of Belgian background (Roeselare)

== Sports ==
- Alice Sue Claeys (1975–), figure skater
- Edgard Colle (1897–1932), Belgian-born chess master; pioneered the chess opening termed the Colle System
- Rob Van Dam (1970–), professional wrestler
- Dave DeBusschere (1940–2003), basketball player
- Roger DeCoster (1944–), legendary Belgian-born motocross racer. His name is almost synonymous with the sport of motocross. He won five 500cc Motocross World Championships and tallied a record 36 500cc Grand Prix victories. He was inducted into the Motorsports Hall of Fame of America in 1994, becoming only the seventh motorcyclist in the Hall. In 1999, he was inducted into the AMA Motorcycle Hall of Fame.
- Jacob deGrom (1988–), baseball player
- Art Houtteman (1927–2003), baseball player
- George Koltanowski (1903–2000), Belgian-born chess player and promoter
- Earl Louis "Curly" Lambeau (1898–1965), founder, player, and the first coach of the Green Bay Packers professional football team; Lambeau Field in Green Bay, Wisconsin is named after him
- Tuffy Leemans (1912–1979), football player and coach
- Dutch Leonard (1909–1983), baseball player
- Gerald Meerschaert (1987-), mixed martial arts fighter
- Ryan Spilborghs (1979–), baseball player
- Tim Tebow (1987–), baseball player, former football player
- John Vanbiesbrouck (1963–), ice hockey goaltender
- Christian Vande Velde (1976–), professional road cyclist, whose grandfather immigrated from Ghent in Flanders
- Kiki Vandeweghe (1958–), basketball player

== Writers ==
- Robert Goffin (1898–1984), author, lawyer and poet
- Kate Bolduan (1983–), journalist
- May Sarton (1912–1995), Belgian-born American poet, novelist, and memoirist; daughter of George Sarton; many of her novels and poems are pellucid reflections of the lesbian experience
- Katrina vanden Heuvel (1959–), editor and publisher
- Mark Vanhoenacker (1974-), writer and pilot
- Michele Wucker (1969–), author
- Marguerite Yourcenar (1903–1987), Belgian-born novelist
- Patricia Ziegfeld Stephenson (1916–2008), author; father of partial Belgian descent
- Lucy Sante (1954–), author

== Other ==
- Cyriel Barbary (1899–2004), last surviving Belgian veteran of the First World War
- Esther de Berdt Reed (1746–178), former First Lady of Pennsylvania
- Paul Vandervoort (1846–1902), Union army soldier
