= CNN Newsroom =

American news program on CNN

- Also known as: CNN Live Today, Live From, CNN Saturday, CNN Saturday Night, CNN Sunday, and CNN Sunday Night
- Genre: News program
- Created by: Jonathan Klein
- Presented by: Jessica Dean; Fredricka Whitfield
- Country of origin: United States
- Original language: English

Production
- Production locations: CNN Center; Atlanta; 30 Hudson Yards; New York City; Washington, D.C.
- Camera setup: Multi-camera
- Running time: 1 hour to 11 hours

Original release
- Network: CNN
- Release: September 4, 2006 – present

Related
- CNN Newsroom (CNN International)

CNN Newsroom (also simply known as Newsroom) is the branding used for blocks of rolling news programming carried by the American cable network CNN. The program debuted on September 4, 2006, consolidating most of CNN's existing rolling news blocks (including CNN Live Today, Live From, CNN Saturday, CNN Saturday Night, CNN Sunday, and CNN Sunday Night) under a single brand.

In April 2023, CNN began to replace Newsroom on weekdays with CNN News Central, with only its weekend editions remaining on the main channel. In September 2023, CNN reintroduced weekday blocks of Newsroom on its then-new streaming platform CNN Max.

In 2024, Newsroom returned to the domestic weekday schedule, with 10 and 11 a.m hours anchored by Jim Acosta and Wolf Blitzer respectively; Blitzer was later succeeded by Pamela Brown in September. In March 2025, these two hours were replaced by a rescheduling of The Situation Room (which also added Brown as a co-anchor alongside Blitzer), once again relegating Newsroom to weekends on the domestic schedule.

== History ==
CNN Newsroom features various anchors on weekdays and weekends. Since September 8, 2008, the program has employed a single-presenter format.

The program shares the same name of an earlier CNN program, debuted in 1989, that was shown commercial-free by teachers in schools.

On June 18, 2012, CNN introduced Around the World presented by Suzanne Malveaux. This hour-long block of news focuses on news across the globe. The show is based in CNN's World Headquarters in Atlanta. On February 25, 2013, Newsroom International was changed to Around the World, but was cancelled on February 7, 2014.

Weekend mornings, which formerly aired under the Newsroom banner before being relaunched as weekend editions of New Day in June 2013, are anchored by Victor Blackwell and Christi Paul. Fredricka Whitfield hosts the weekend daytime edition of Newsroom. The weekend afternoon/evening edition was originally hosted by Don Lemon (later Poppy Harlow and Ana Cabrera).

On August 12, 2013, CNN/U.S. rebranded the a portion of the broadcast of Newsroom as Legal View with Ashleigh Banfield. The 60-minute-long show based in New York focused on the most important legal news of the day, and aired its last episode on September 23, 2016. From August 12, 2013, to February 7, 2014, Newsroom, with its reduced airtime, aired weekday mornings for two hours anchored by Carol Costello. Wolf Blitzer anchored the a later hour of the program with Brooke Baldwin until February 2014, when the slot became the standalone program Wolf, which ran until November 9, 2018.

On February 10, 2014, an hour of CNN Newsroom was renamed At This Hour with Berman and Michaela, hosted by John Berman and Michaela Pereira.

In November 2014, Poppy Harlow took over primetime anchoring duties on weekend evening editions of CNN Newsroom. The shift was covered by rotating anchors following Don Lemon's move to CNN Tonight in early 2014.

In February 2017, Carol Costello left CNN for HLN, and was succeeded by John Berman and Poppy Harlow. Ana Cabrera took over Harlow's weekend evening slot.

In May 2018, John Berman left the show to become the new co-anchor of New Day, the flagship morning program for CNN.

In September 2018, Jim Sciutto became the new co-anchor in CNN Newsroom on the show with Poppy Harlow.

In January 2021, CNN announced Pamela Brown as the host of the 6 p.m. – 9 p.m. edition on weekends.

In February 2021, CNN announced a major change to its schedule. Brianna Keilar’s CNN Right Now program was canceled and replaced by an hour of CNN Newsroom hosted by Ana Cabrera on the 1-2 p.m. slot while Alisyn Camerota and Victor Blackwell took the place of Brooke Baldwin (who left CNN in mid-April) on the 2–4 p.m. slot of CNN Newsroom.

In August 2021, Poppy Harlow announced she would be leaving CNN temporarily to attend a one year law school program. She continued to anchor the 9–11 a.m. slot on holidays, days off, or filling in for other anchors on other CNN programs including CNN Newsroom. She returned to her regular timeslot on May 30, 2022.

On December 15, 2022, it was confirmed that Ana Cabrera would be leaving CNN at the end of her 1 p.m. ET program on December 22; she subsequently moved to MSNBC in April 2023, hosting Ana Cabrera Reports.

In April 2023, CNN began to replace Newsroom on weekdays with the new format CNN News Central, which is designed as a more "energetic" format with a focus on breaking news coverage, visual elements influenced by its coverage of special events, and teams of anchors present throughout the block. Alisyn Camerota moved exclusively to CNN Tonight, while Victor Blackwell moved to Saturday mornings co-hosting CNN This Morning Weekend, and anchoring an hour of Newsroom.

In late September 2023, CNN adopted the Newsroom title for rolling news blocks on its new streaming channel CNN Max; these editions air from 8 to 11 a.m. ET and 2 to 3 p.m. ET featuring existing weekend anchors Amara Walker, Fredericka Whitfield and Jim Acosta, along with Jim Sciutto and Rahel Solomon.

In February 2024, following the cancelation of CNN This Morning, it was announced that a weekday hour of Newsroom with Jim Acosta would air at 10 a.m. ET. Wolf Blitzer also began anchoring an 11 a.m. hour of Newsroom as an interim program; the timeslot was to be filled by The Bulletin with Pamela Brown once she returned from maternity leave. Brown began hosting the 11 a.m. hour in September 2024, but with the Newsroom branding maintained.

On January 23, 2025, CNN announced upcoming changes to its schedule, including the replacement of Acosta and Brown's hours of Newsroom with a rescheduling of The Situation Room—which would add Brown as a co-anchor alongside Wolf Blitzer. The new programming took effect on March 3, 2025.

== Notable personalities ==
Programs occasionally pre-empted for special programs.

=== Current anchors ===
==== Weekends ====
Time (ET)	Saturday Anchors		
1PM - 2PM	Fredricka Whitfield (Atlanta)		
2PM - 3PM	Fredricka Whitfield (Atlanta)		
3PM - 4PM	Fredricka Whitfield (Atlanta)		
4PM – 5PM
5PM – 6PM
-	6PM – 7PM	-	7PM - 8PM

Time (ET)	Sunday Anchors	2PM – 3PM	Fredricka Whitfield (Atlanta)
3PM – 4PM			Fredricka Whitfield (Atlanta)
4PM – 5PM			Fredricka Whitfield (Atlanta)
5PM – 6PM	Jessica Dean (New York City)		
6PM – 7PM	Jessica Dean (New York City)		
7PM – 8PM	Jessica Dean (New York City)		

=== Weather team ===
- Chad Myers

=== Substitute anchors ===
- Bianna Golodryga

=== Former anchors ===
Time (ET)	Anchor
9AM – 11AM	Poppy Harlow (later an anchor for CNN This Morning; left CNN in 2024)
10AM – 11AM	Jim Acosta (left CNN)
1PM – 2PM	Ana Cabrera (left CNN, now with MS NOW)
2PM – 4PM	Brooke Baldwin (left CNN)
6PM – 9PM	Pamela Brown (later an anchor for The Situation Room)

== Awards ==
In 2010, CNN Newsroom was nominated for a GLAAD Media Award for "Outstanding TV Journalism - Newsmagazine" for the episode "Gay Killings in Iraq" during the 21st GLAAD Media Awards. Also that year, it was nominated for "Outstanding TV Journalism Segment" for the segment "Lt. Col. Victor Fehrenbach 'I Was Utterly Devastated'".

== Gaffes ==
In September 2014, CNN technology analyst Brett Larson was criticized after incorrectly referring to the imageboard website 4chan as a person, suggesting it was “a systems administrator who knew his away around and how to hack things”. He had appeared on the program to explain the leak of nude celebrity photos from several hacked iCloud accounts.

In June 2015, a London gay pride parade included an ISIL parody flag, replacing the Arabic letters with dildos and butt plugs. Malveaux described the presence of an ISIS flag at a gay pride parade as "unnerving" before a seven-minute live cross to a CNN "terrorism expert" in London.

Preceded by Smerconish	CNN Saturday lineup 10:00 am – 9:00 pm	Succeeded by CNN Original Series

Preceded by CNN Sunday Lineup	CNN Sunday lineup 2:00 pm – 9:00 pm	Succeeded by CNN Original Series
