= John Berman =

American news anchor (born 1972)

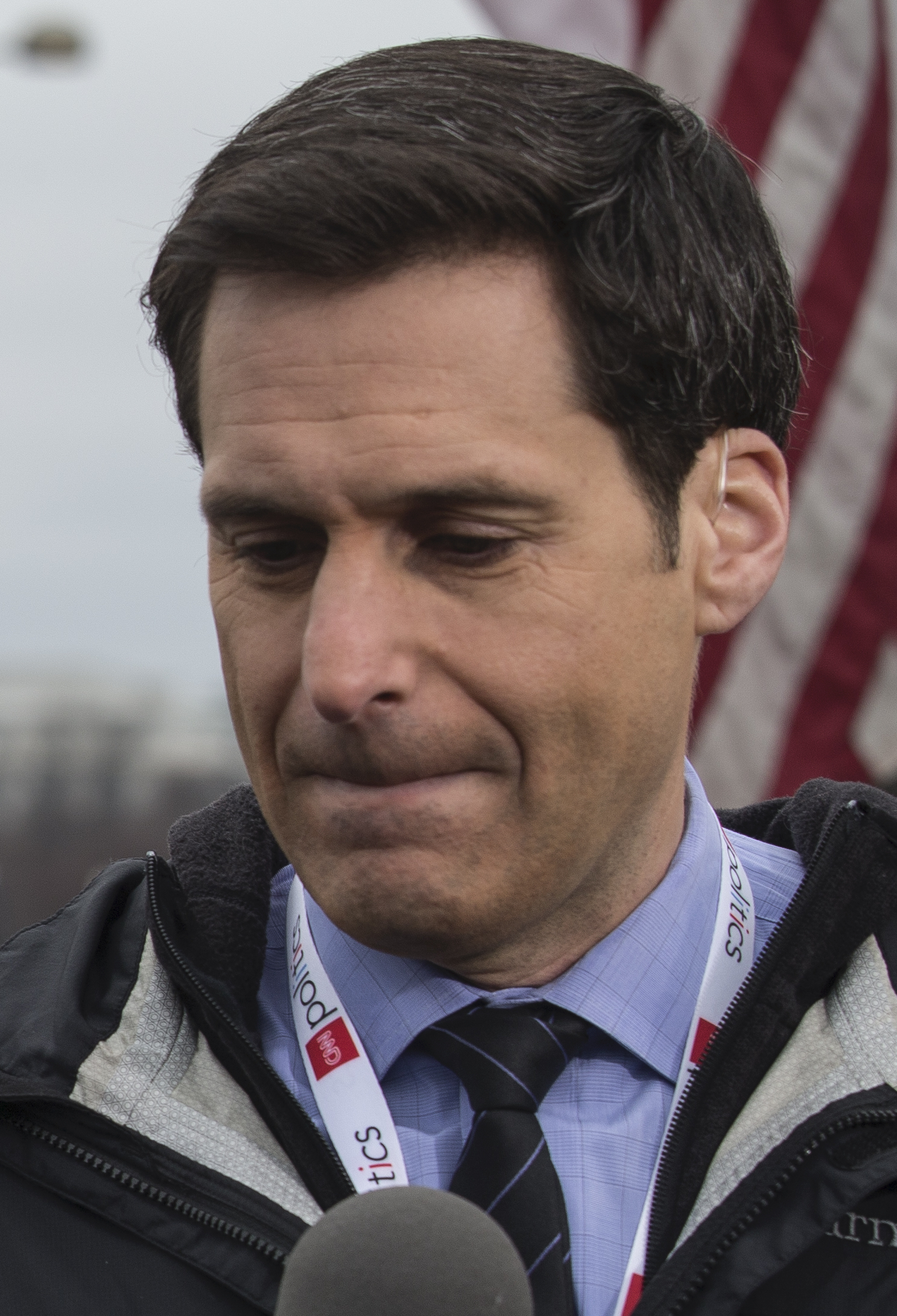
- Born: March 21, 1972 (age 54)
- Education: Harvard University (BA)
- Occupation: Broadcast journalist
- Years active: 1995–present
- Notable credit(s): ABC News (1995–2012); ABC World News Tonight head writer (1997–1999); CNN Early Start co-anchor (2012–2017); CNN Newsroom co-anchor (2017–2018); CNN New Day (TV program) co-anchor (2018–2022); CNN News Central (2023-present)
- Spouse: Kerry Voss
- Children: 2

John Berman (born March 21, 1972) is an American news anchor who is a co-anchor of the morning edition of CNN News Central and a regular relief presenter of Anderson Cooper 360°. Berman is the former co-anchor of CNN's New Day with Brianna Keilar on CNN.

== Early life ==
Berman is Sephardic Jewish. Berman was educated at Phillips Academy Andover, an independent co-educational, boarding and day, university-preparatory school in the town of Andover in Massachusetts, which he left in 1990, followed by Harvard University, from which he graduated summa cum laude with a Bachelor of Arts degree in social studies.

== Career ==
After leaving Harvard, Berman joined ABC News in a junior office post, rising to become Chief Writer for Peter Jennings, the long-term newscaster of ABC World News Tonight. After the inauguration of President George W. Bush, Berman was assigned to cover the White House. After six months, he asked to be reassigned to New York. On his first week in the job, the towers of the World Trade Center were destroyed in the September 11 attacks. Then, as a general assignment reporter, Berman reported from Iraq, embedded with a United States Marine infantry battalion at the beginning of the Iraq War in Nasiriyah as an on-air correspondent. He says, “It was an incredible personal experience, absolutely terrifying, risky and physically grueling. As a reporter, you always want to be covering the biggest stories, despite the risks".

On September 15, 2022, it was announced that Berman would leave his role on New Day with Brianna Keilar later that year. He would continue to co-anchor the show until the new CNN revamped morning show debuted. He would then be assigned a new anchor role at the network.

In January 2023, CNN announced plans to revamp its daytime programming, Berman was named a co-anchor with Kate Bolduan and Sara Sidner from 9 a.m. until noon on their new program CNN News Central, which debuted on April 3, 2023.

== Jeopardy! ==
Berman appeared in a celebrity Jeopardy! episode on May 13, 2015. He defeated other celebrity contestants Mo Rocca and Wendi McLendon-Covey to win $50,000 for children's charity Friends of Karen.

== Personal life ==
Berman is married to Kerry Voss; they have two sons. They live in Armonk, New York.

== See also ==
- New Yorkers in journalism
