= Kate Bolduan =

American journalist (born 1983)

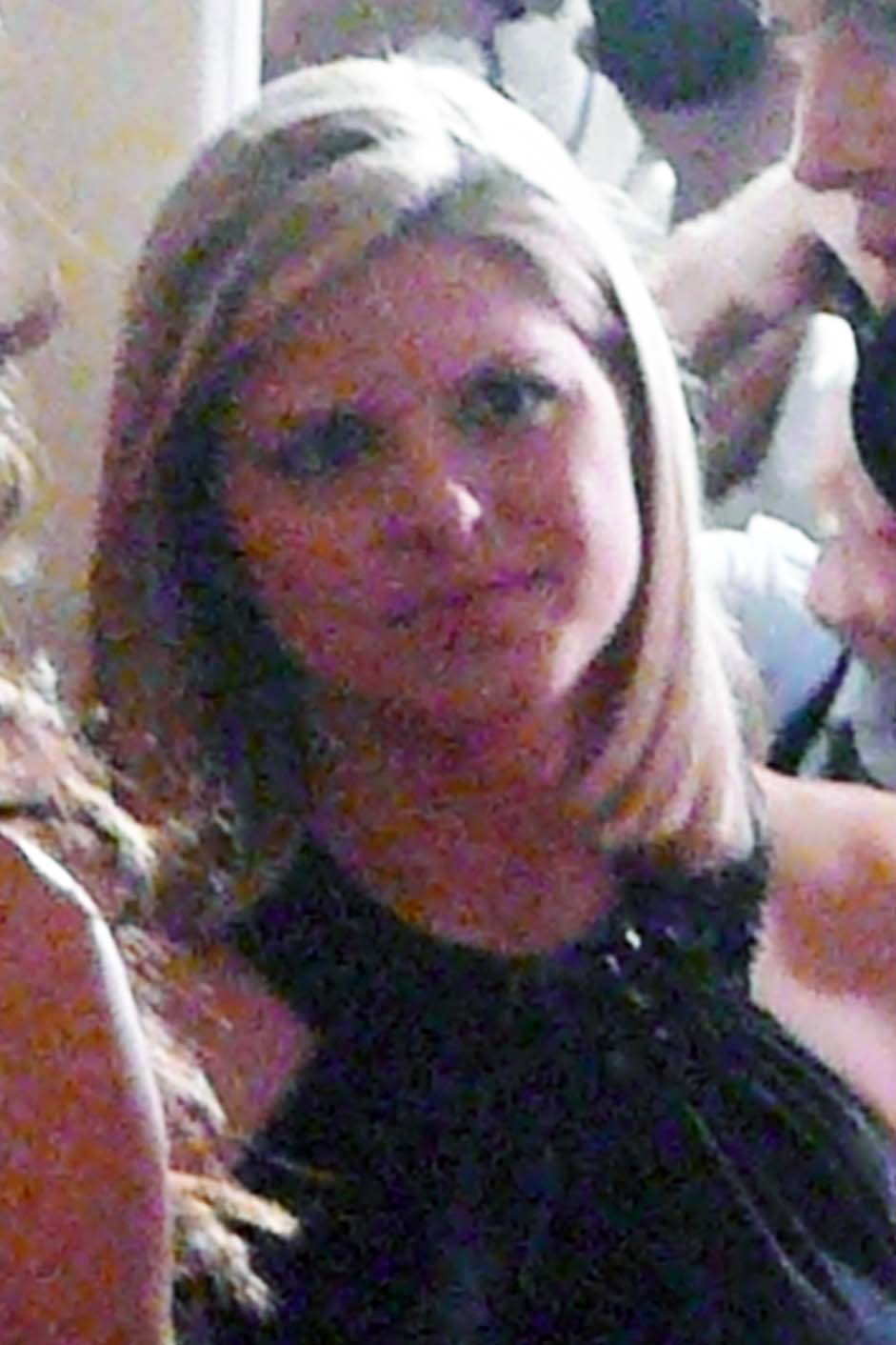
- Bolduan in 2009
- Born: Katherine Jean Bolduan; July 28, 1983 (age 43); Goshen, Indiana, U.S.
- Education: George Washington University (BA)
- Occupations: News anchor; journalist
- Notable credit(s): WTVD-TV; NBC News; MSNBC; House & Garden Magazine Dateline NBC; NBC Nightly News; CNN; CNN International
- Spouse: Michael David Gershenson (m. 2010)
- Children: 2
- Website: Kate Bolduan on X

Katherine Jean Bolduan (/ˈbɔːldwɪn/; born July 28, 1983) is an American broadcast journalist and news anchor for CNN based in New York City. She is currently a co-anchor of CNN News Central, and previously anchored State of America with Kate Bolduan, New Day and At This Hour with Kate Bolduan. She also served as a congressional correspondent based in Washington, D.C., as well as a general assignment correspondent for the network.

== Early life and education ==
A native of Goshen, Indiana, she is the third of four daughters born to Dr. Jeffrey Bolduan, and to Nadine Bolduan, a nurse. Her mother is of Belgian heritage. Kate Bolduan was educated at Goshen High School, a public high school in her home city, followed by George Washington University, from which she graduated Phi Beta Kappa and summa cum laude in 2005, with a bachelor's degree in journalism and a minor in political science. During her time at the university, she walked on to the women's volleyball team and acted with the student theatre organization. During her studies, she spent time in Madrid, Spain, where she learned to speak Spanish.

== Career ==
=== Post-college (2005–2007) ===
From 2005 to 2007, Bolduan worked as a general assignment reporter for WTVD-TV in Durham, North Carolina. She then became a production assistant for NBC News and MSNBC in Washington D.C. She has worked at House & Garden magazine, Dateline NBC and NBC Nightly News.

=== CNN (2007–present) ===
==== CNN Newsource ====
Bolduan began her tenure in 2007 at CNN as a national correspondent for CNN Newsource. She provided breaking news coverage and feature reports for a large number of CNN Newsource affiliates. During her time there, she most notably covered the 2008 United States presidential election and traveled throughout the United States covering other news making headlines including the Minneapolis Bridge collapse, the O. J. Simpson armed robbery case, and the retiring NASA Space Shuttle fleet. She delivered CNN's initial misreporting on the Supreme Court's decision to uphold "Obamacare" on June 28, 2012, and her future at the network seemed uncertain at the time. However, CNN immediately made her co-anchor with Wolf Blitzer.

==== The Situation Room with Wolf Blitzer ====
Bolduan was previously co-anchor of The Situation Room with Wolf Blitzer before moving to New York. Alongside Wolf Blitzer, she provided current events, breaking news, political headlines, and reports within lively discussions during the two-hour program.

==== New Day ====
New Day is a weekday morning television show on CNN. It premiered on June 17, 2013, and airs from 6:00 a.m. to 9:00 a.m. ET, originating from CNN's Time Warner Center studios in New York City. New Day replaced Starting Point, formerly anchored by Soledad O'Brien, which had aired since January 2, 2012.

==== At This Hour with Kate Bolduan ====
Bolduan joined CNN's new morning show, @This Hour, which premiered on January 26, 2015, alongside John Berman. At This Hour covered various news stories of the day with co-hosts Kate Bolduan and John Berman. At This Hour aired weekdays from 11 a.m. to noon ET, and was broadcast live from CNN's New York Studios in Manhattan. On February 6, 2017, Berman moved to 9 a.m. to co-host CNN Newsroom and Bolduan took over as the sole host of the show as it changed name to At This Hour.

The show was eventually removed from the CNN lineup but returned in April 2021. The focus of the show is on daily events with correspondents sending their on-site live reports into the studio. At This Hour also presents moderated live interviews and discussions with guests in the studio or via teleconference. On April 3, 2023, she joined the program's successor, CNN News Central, alongside Berman and Sara Sidner.

==== State of America with Kate Bolduan ====
Bolduan was named anchor of State of America with Kate Bolduan, a CNN International program which covered the 2016 U.S. Presidential campaign for a global audience. Following the election, the program was renamed and pivoted to focusing on U.S. news and affairs. The show aired Fridays at 23:00 CET from CNN's New York studios in Manhattan.

During the first ten minutes of the show, Bolduan discussed the daily news. Following a commercial break a panel, typically consisting of four journalists and analysts from various backgrounds, discussed current affairs.

The last episode was aired on September 20, 2019.

=== Features ===
==== Kate Bolduan's Roots ====
External media

Images
- Kate Bolduan (October 10, 2014). "Kate Bolduan's Roots". CNN.

Video
- Kate Bolduan (October 20, 2014). "Kate Bolduan's Roots". CNN.

In 2014, Bolduan made a television feature documentary titled Kate Bolduan's Roots. Some of Bolduan's ancestors arrived in America in 1912. They came from a small town called Chênée in Belgium. Leon Emile Rousselle (Bolduan's great-great-grandfather) arrived in the United States aboard the SS Kroonland. Two months later, his pregnant wife Louise Labhaye Rousselle and his two-year-old daughter travelled to the U.S. aboard the SS Lapland (which returned some survivors – mainly crew members – of the Titanic catastrophe to England). The Rousselles came from a long line of glass manufacturers. In 2014, Bolduan travelled to Liège in Belgium to find out about her family history.

==== Champions for Change ====
Champions for Change is an annual series at CNN where anchors and staff choose a topic and go out of their regular format. It follows the Champions of Change initiative of the Obama White House.

===== The Story Behind Farm Aid =====
External videos
- Kate Bolduan (June 12, 2017). "The Story behind Farm Aid". CNN.

Bolduan grew up in a subdivision near an apple orchard. In 2017, she went to farms in Virginia to film a feature for the CNN series Champions for Change. It was called The story behind Farm Aid in relation to Farm Aid. She interviewed small and environmentally friendly farmers on their perspective of their situation in America.

===== Every Mother Counts =====
External videos
- Kate Bolduan (June 18, 2018). "Every mother counts". CNN.

In 2018, Bolduan produced another television feature for the Champions for Change series. She spent time with the Every Mother Counts organisation which helps pregnant women by giving them information and other support. The organisation is international, working in Asia, Africa, North- and South America.

===== Offering Shelter from a Violent World =====
External videos
- Kate Bolduan (May 18, 2019). "Offering shelter from a violent world". CNN.

In a 2019 television feature, Bolduan visited the non-profit organization KOB (Kids Off the Block) in Chicago, founded by Diane Latiker. Bolduan spoke with her for the first time ten years ago. KOB exists since 15 years and supports children and teenager by offering them a place and education in informatics. KOB is located in Roseland, one of Chicago's most underfunded districts.

=== Podcast ===
Since April 2019, Kate Bolduan, John Avlon as well as Harry Enten produce the audio-only podcast The Forecast Fest. It is about the presidential election of 2020 in the US and other political topics. The last episode was produced March 19, 2020. During the COVID-19 crisis in 2020, she spoke with her colleague Sanjay Gupta on how to talk with (her own) children about the consequences and the measurements to curb the spreading speed. She also wrote an article on that topic.

=== Independent activities ===
Bolduan advocates for children, namely at the Free Arts NYC society. She also intercedes for protection of mothers and newborn and their medical well-being.

In 2019, she took part in the Alzheimer's & Brain Awareness Month event.

==== Moderation outside of television ====
External videos
- Kate Bolduan (September 25, 2019). "Mike Bloomberg, Mary Nichols and Will Marshall discuss the opportunity for environmental protection by satellite imaginary". mikebloomberg.com.

External videos
- Kate Bolduan (September 25, 2019). "Interview with President Sauli Niinistö of Finland on Global Leadership and the Climate Crisis". www.mikebloomberg.com.

Occasionally, Bolduan works as a freelance presenter and speaker.

She is a presenter for the Fashion Tech Forum. Founded by Karen Harvey FTF supports innovators in this field since 2014.

In 2016, she moderated a discussion at the 2016 United Nations Global Compact Private Sector Forum. The Forum tries to encourage businesses all around the world to follow rules of fair trade and production.

In October 2018, Bolduan moderated a conversation lasting two days at the Marie Claire Power Trip Conference guesting Theresia Gouw and Sukhinder Singh Cassidy in San Francisco. The purpose of the conference was to "create more and better opportunities for women in tech and venture capital, two predominately male-run industries."

On the occasion of the 10th annual summit, in April 2019 at the live journalism event Women in the World, she had a conversation with the designer Diane von Fürstenberg. The topic was the importance of basic decisions and character for modern women.

On August 13, 2019, she moderated a conversation round in the Woodrow Wilson Center called Decoding the Disinformation Problem the guests and Bolduan herself discussed actual problems of mass media like TV and Internet with fake news and intentional misinformation campaigns by individuals and organisations up to states for mainly political purpose.

In September 2019, Bolduan spoke with Michael Bloomberg, Mary Nichols (chairwoman of the California Air Resources Board (CARB)), Will Marshall (the CEO of Planet Labs, a private firm, which provides services in satellite imaging for environmental protection reasons with small satellites for example to detect CO_{2} emitters from orbit) and the president of Finland Sauli Niinistö at the 2019 Bloomberg Global Business Forum.

== Personal life ==
In May 2010, Bolduan married Michael Gershenson, son of Bruce Alan Gershenson, principal of RPT Realty in Detroit. They moved from the Washington D.C. area to New York in early 2013 after Bolduan accepted the anchor position at CNN's morning lineup. The couple's first daughter was born in September 2014. Their second daughter was born in December 2017. The couple belong to the Park Avenue Synagogue in Manhattan, New York City.

== See also ==
- List of people from Indiana (Hoosiers)
- List of Belgian Americans
