= Chad Myers =

American meteorologist

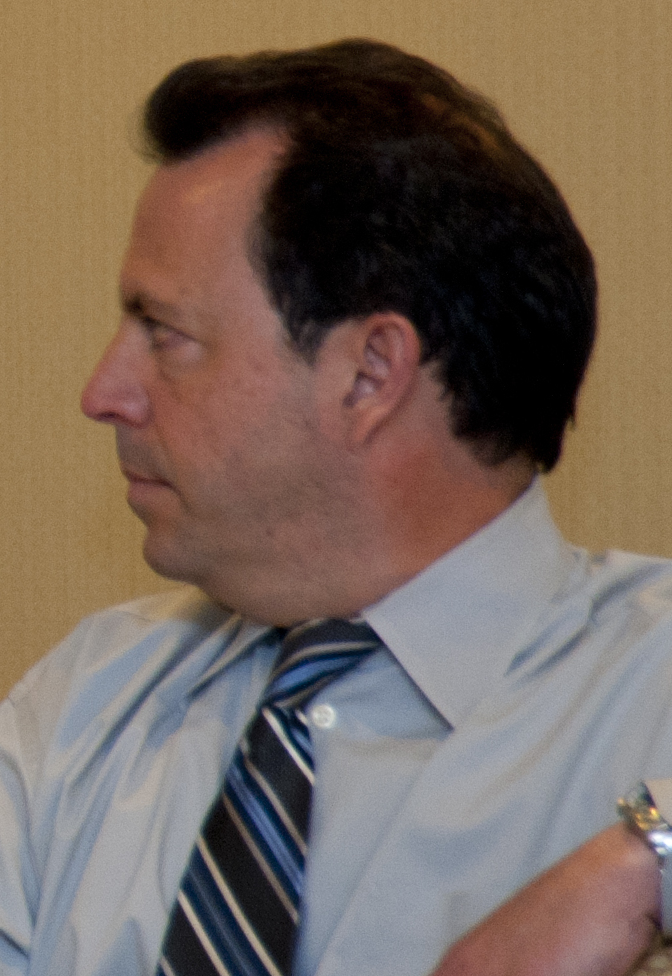
- Alma mater: University of Nebraska system
- Occupation: Weather presenter; meteorologist
- Employer: CNN (1999–)

Chad Everett Myers is an American meteorologist and the severe weather expert for CNN. He reports on weather trends across the United States and Canada on a daily basis.

== Biography ==
Myers, a native of Buffalo, New York, earned a bachelor's degree in meteorology from the University of Nebraska–Lincoln in 1987. He joined CNN in October 1999, moving up from working as the morning weather analyst at WXYZ-TV in Detroit. He has received Peabody Awards for contributing to the Gulf War coverage, and for scientific explanations of the BP oil spill and its subsequent capping in the Gulf of Mexico. He also covered the 2011 Japan tsunami and the nuclear meltdown of the Fukushima Daiichi reactors.

== On-air ==
He was spoofed on Late Show with David Letterman after climbing into a mock-up of the Chilean miners' rescue capsule. The producers of the show shot him into the sun after showing him climbing into the mock-up.

In 2005 during Hurricane Katrina reporting, Myers had an on-air argument with anchor Carol Costello, when she kept interrupting him during a broadcast. He yelled, "Let me talk, Carol!" after she referred to him by name in an attempt to encourage Myers to clarify some of the more technical terminology used in his report.

== Climate opinions ==
In 2010 Myers claimed in an on-air interview that climatologists were only reporting the climate is changing because their jobs were at stake and that "they worked for the government".

In August 2016, Bill Nye criticized CNN for having a "climate change denier meteorologist"; however, Myers wrote that subsequent to 2013's crossing of 400 ppm carbon dioxide levels in the atmosphere, he was no longer a “skeptic”, and had changed his views on the science behind climate change. "I concluded that my original theory of 'it could be something else' wasn't likely the case," Myers said.
