= Inauguration of George Bush =

Inauguration of George Bush may refer to any of the following inaugurations by United States presidents George H. W. Bush (the 41st president, father of 43rd) and George W. Bush (the 43rd president, son of 41st):

- Inauguration of George H. W. Bush, 1989
- First inauguration of Ronald Reagan, in which George H. W. Bush was inaugurated as vice president in 1981
- Second inauguration of Ronald Reagan, in which George H. W. Bush was inaugurated as vice president in 1985
- First inauguration of George W. Bush, 2001
- Second inauguration of George W. Bush, 2005

== See also ==
- The full text of George H. W. Bush's Inaugural Address at Wikisource
- The full text of George W. Bush's First Inaugural Address at Wikisource
- The full text of George W. Bush's Second Inaugural Address at Wikisource
