= Sara Sidner =

American journalist (born 1972)

- Born: May 31, 1972 (age 54); Miami Lakes, Florida, U.S.
- Education: University of Florida
- Occupation: Correspondent (CNN)
- Website: https://www.cnn.com/profiles/sara-sidner-profile

Sara Sidner (born May 31, 1972) is an American TV reporter who is a co-anchor of the morning edition of CNN News Central. She anchored Big Picture with Sara Sidner on CNN+, the network's short-lived subscription service.

== Early life ==
A native of Miami Lakes, Florida, Sidner was born to an African-American father and a British mother. She graduated from Hialeah-Miami Lakes High School and the University of Florida with a telecommunications degree. While a student at the university, she played on the women's volleyball team, which made the Final Four during her last year.

== Career ==
Sidner began her on-air reporting career at WUFT-TV in Gainesville, Florida. This was followed by periods at KFVS-TV in Cape Girardeau, Missouri, WINK-TV in Fort Myers, Florida, and KDFW-TV in Dallas, Texas. At KDFW, she spent three years as a consumer reporter/anchor. She also distinguished herself by reporting on the Space Shuttle Columbia disaster. In January 2004, Sidner joined KTVU in Oakland, California, where she served as a weekend co-anchor of KTVU Channel 2 News at 6 and The Ten O’Clock News. She also served as a weekday reporter for the station.

Sidner has received many journalism awards. These include a Regional Emmy Award, a Lone Star Award, and several Associated Press Awards.

=== CNN ===
Sidner was a national and international correspondent for CNN, based in Los Angeles. She has previously been based in Jerusalem, Abu Dhabi, and New Delhi. At CNN, Sidner has reported on a wide range of subjects including the 2011 Libyan civil war, the launching of India's first uncrewed lunar probe, and the Mumbai terrorist attacks.

On May 31, 2020, while in Minneapolis covering the protests sparked by the murder of George Floyd by police officer Derek Chauvin, Sidner conducted a newsmaking live interview with the city's police chief, Medaria Arradondo, in which Arradondo expressed his opinion that the three other officers who were present during the murder also bore responsibility.

In January 2023, CNN announced plans to revamp its daytime programming. Sidner was named a co-anchor along with John Berman and Kate Bolduan from 9 a.m. until noon on their new program titled CNN News Central, which later debuted on April 3, 2023.

On October 11, 2023, Sidner was accused of streaming false information spread by the Israeli Prime Minister office regarding victims of the Kfar Aza massacre carried out by Hamas in Southern Israel. She had reported that "babies and toddlers were found with their (quoted) heads decapitated in Kfar Aza in southern Israel after Hamas' attacks in the kibbutz over the weekend, a spokesperson for Israel's prime minister says." CNN later reported that the Israeli government cannot verify the claim that Hamas beheaded infants, but indicated that Hamas murdered the babies by other means. U.S. President Joe Biden initially claimed that he had seen evidence of Hamas fighters beheading children, before the White House clarified that they cannot confirm whether any beheadings took place. Sidner then apologised via her personal Twitter account and alleged that she had been misled by other parties.

== Health ==
On January 8, 2024, during the end an episode of CNN News Central, Sidner revealed that she had been diagnosed with stage III breast cancer. She underwent treatment while maintaining her journalistic duties, regularly updating her followers on social media about her treatment progress and raising awareness about breast cancer. She had a double mastectomy, 16 rounds of chemotherapy and 25 rounds of radiation, completing her treatment on October 10, 2024.
