= CNN News Central =

American news program on CNN

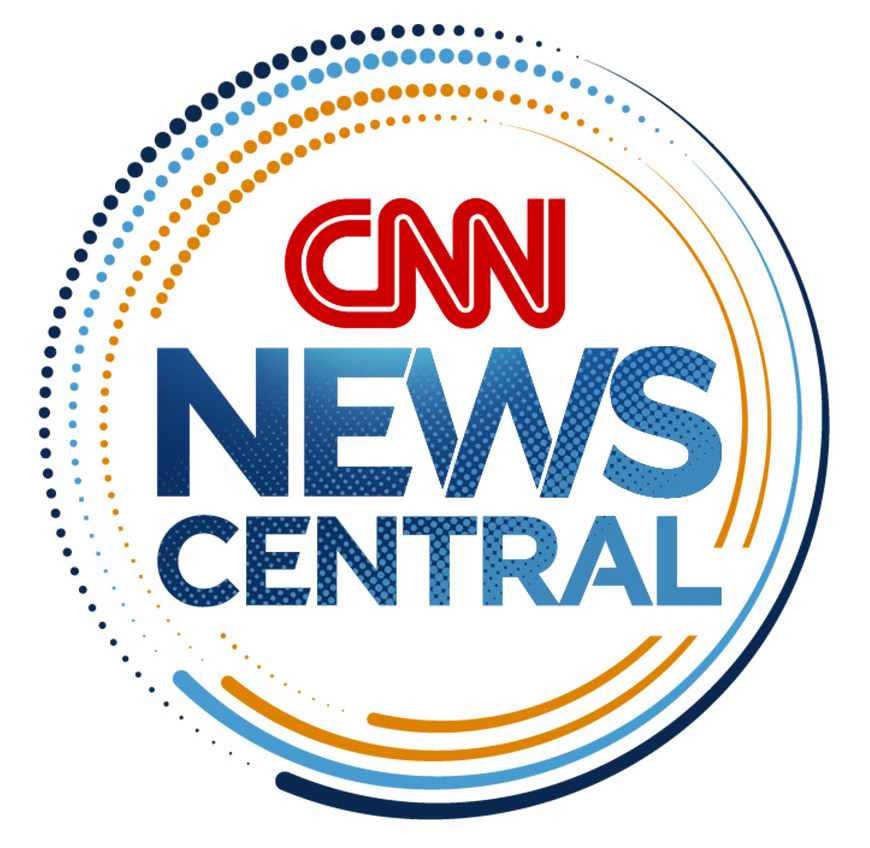
- Genre: News
- Created by: Chris Licht
- Presented by: AM (NYC); John Berman; Kate Bolduan; Sara Sidner; PM (DC); Brianna Keilar; Boris Sanchez
- Country of origin: United States
- Original language: English

Production
- Production locations: 30 Hudson Yards; New York City; CNN Studios Washington, D.C.
- Camera setup: Multi-camera
- Running time: 180 minutes

Original release
- Network: CNN; CNN International; HLN
- Release: April 3, 2023 – present

Related
- CNN Newsroom (CNN International)

CNN News Central is a daytime news program carried by the U.S. cable news channel CNN. It premiered on April 3, 2023, as part of a phase-out of CNN's existing rolling news block CNN Newsroom, with its afternoon edition premiering two weeks later on April 17, 2023. The morning edition is anchored by John Berman, Kate Bolduan, and Sara Sidner in New York City and is simulcast on sister network HLN, while the afternoon edition is anchored by Brianna Keilar and Boris Sanchez in Washington, D.C.

With the cancellation of CNN This Morning, the morning edition of News Central was moved into its timeslot as a replacement in February 2024, and the first 30 minutes of the morning edition is broadcast on CNN International, and in early 2025 the global simulcast was extended with the first hour and a half of the morning edition now airing on CNN International.

== History ==
In January 2023, as part of changes to CNN's programming instituted by new president Chris Licht, it was announced that the network planned to re-launch its daytime rolling news blocks with a new format. On March 1, 2023, it was announced that the programs would be titled CNN News Central, with its morning edition from New York premiering on April 3, 2023, and an afternoon edition anchored from Washington premiering on April 17, 2023.

News Central features teams of anchors that are present throughout their respective block (rather than having blocks hosted by solo anchors throughout the day, as with its predecessor CNN Newsroom, and the competing dayside blocks America's Newsroom and MS NOW Reports on Fox News and MS NOW respectively). Its presentation utilizes a "visual-first" approach influenced by CNN special event coverage such as elections, including the extensive use of infographics on video walls in the studio to highlight key points and imagery related to the story being discussed.

On August 14, 2023, CNN announced that the 3 p.m. ET hour of News Central would be replaced by a new program, The Bulletin with Pamela Brown. In September 2023, Jim Sciutto moved to CNN Newsroom on CNN Max.

On February 26, 2024, the morning edition of News Central was moved up from 9 a.m. to 7 a.m. due to the cancellation of CNN This Morning, and is simulcast on sister network HLN (due to contractual obligations regarding HLN's news content).

== Personnel ==
=== Current anchors ===
==== Mornings From 7am to 10am (New York City) ====
- John Berman, anchor (since April 3, 2023)
- Kate Bolduan, anchor (since April 3, 2023)
- Sara Sidner, anchor (since April 3, 2023)

==== Afternoons from 1pm to 4pm (Washington D.C.) ====
- Brianna Keilar, anchor (since April 17, 2023)
- Boris Sanchez, anchor (since April 17, 2023)

=== Former anchors ===
- Jim Sciutto (April 17, 2023 – September 2023)

Preceded by CNN This Morning with Audie Cornish	CNN News Central (AM); 7:00 AM – 10:00 AM	Succeeded by The Situation Room with Wolf Blitzer and Pamela Brown

Preceded by Inside Politics	CNN News Central (PM); 1:00 PM – 4:00PM	Succeeded by The Arena with Kasie Hunt
