= Brianna Keilar =

American journalist (born 1980)

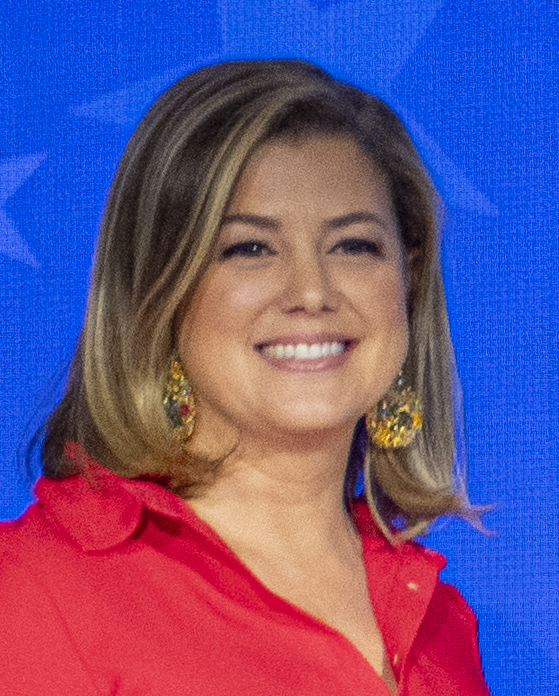
- Keilar in 2023
- Born: Brianna Marie Keilar; September 21, 1980 (age 45); Canberra, Australian Capital Territory, Australia
- Education: University of California, Berkeley (BA)
- Spouses: Dave French (m. 2009; div. 2011) Fernando Lujan (m. 2016)
- Children: 1

Brianna Marie Keilar (born September 21, 1980) is an American journalist who currently serves as a co-anchor of the afternoon edition of CNN News Central. She previously worked as a White House correspondent, senior political correspondent, Congressional correspondent and general assignment correspondent for CNN in Washington. Prior to that, Keilar worked at CNN Newsource as a national correspondent, also in Washington. Before joining New Day, she was the host of CNN Right Now with Brianna Keilar.

== Early life and education ==
Keilar was born in Canberra, Australian Capital Territory, Australia. Her father Glenn is Australian, and her mother Miriam was American. The Keilars were stationed in Australia at the time of Brianna's birth. In 1982, Keilar and her family moved to the United States and settled in Orange County, California. Keilar graduated from Mission Viejo High School in 1998, where she was voted homecoming queen in her senior year. Keilar then attended the University of California, Berkeley, from which she graduated in 2001 with dual bachelor's degrees in mass communications and psychology.

== Career ==
Keilar began her on-air career in Yakima, Washington, at the CBS affiliate KIMA. She also co-hosted the morning drivetime show Billy, Blue and Brianna, too: The Morning Zoo on contemporary hits station, KFFM.

=== CBS News ===
She then moved to CBS News, where she served as an anchor, reporter and producer for a CBS newscast that aired on MTVU, MTV's college network. She was also a fill-in anchor on the CBS News overnight newscast, Up to the Minute, and a freelance reporter for the weekend edition of CBS Evening News.

=== CNN ===
From CBS, Keilar joined CNN as a correspondent for CNN Newsource, providing breaking news coverage and reports from the nation's capital for approximately 800 CNN Newsource partner stations. As a general assignment correspondent for the network, she covered a wide range of stories, including the 2007 Virginia Tech massacre, where she was the first CNN correspondent at the scene.

While covering Congress, Keilar earned the 2009 National Press Foundation Everett McKinley Dirksen Award for Distinguished Reporting of Congress for her fall 2008 coverage of the $700 billion bank bailout. While covering the Obama White House, Keilar earned the White House Correspondents' Association's 2014 Aldo Beckman Memorial Award for her coverage of the rollout of Obamacare.

Keilar, a military spouse, began writing a column called Home Front in 2019, which tells stories of military families and tries to bridge the civilian-military divide.

Keilar joined New Day in 2021, co-anchoring with John Berman. On September 15, 2022, it was announced that Keilar would leave her role on New Day as the show is replaced by CNN This Morning. She continued to co-anchor the show until the new CNN revamped morning show debuted on November 1.

In April 2023, Keilar joined Boris Sanchez and Jim Sciutto as a co-anchor of a new show titled CNN News Central. She co-anchors the afternoon edition which runs from 1 p.m. through 4 p.m.

== Personal life ==
Keilar married Dave French on May 2, 2009. They later divorced. In July 2016, Keilar announced that she was engaged to Fernando Lujan, an active duty Green Beret who was then a director on the National Security Council at the White House. During CNN's New Year's Eve Live on December 31, 2016, Brooke Baldwin announced that Keilar and Lujan had married the previous evening in Las Vegas. She gave birth to a boy on June 8, 2018.
