= The Situation Room (TV program) =

American news broadcast

- Also known as: Wolf Blitzer Reports (2000–2005); The Situation Room with Wolf Blitzer (2005–2025); The Situation Room with Wolf Blitzer and Pamela Brown (2025–present)
- Genre: News broadcast
- Presented by: Wolf Blitzer (2000–present); Pamela Brown (2025–present)
- Country of origin: United States
- Original language: English

Production
- Executive producers: Sam Feist (2005–11); Jay Shaylor (2013–19); Emily Atkinson (2019–present)
- Production locations: CNN Studios, Washington, D.C.
- Running time: 120 minutes

Original release
- Network: CNN
- Release: December 8, 2000 – present

The Situation Room with Wolf Blitzer and Pamela Brown, also known as simply The Situation Room, is an American cable news program broadcast by CNN which premiered on August 8, 2005. The program primarily focuses on in-depth coverage of major news headlines. It has been anchored since its inception by Wolf Blitzer, joined since March 2025 by Pamela Brown.

The Situation Room originally premiered with the title Wolf Blitzer Reports on December 8, 2000, as an afternoon/early evening newscast on CNN hosted by Blitzer, until August 5, 2005. The program focused on the day's top news, live interviews with top newsmakers and live debriefs with CNN correspondents around the United States and the world.

Until 2025, The Situation Room primarily aired on weekday evenings, and occasionally on weekends during major news events. From 2008 to 2013, CNN aired a Saturday edition of the program that served as a week-in-review. In March 2025, The Situation Room moved to a new morning timeslot and added a co-anchor for the first time.

== History ==
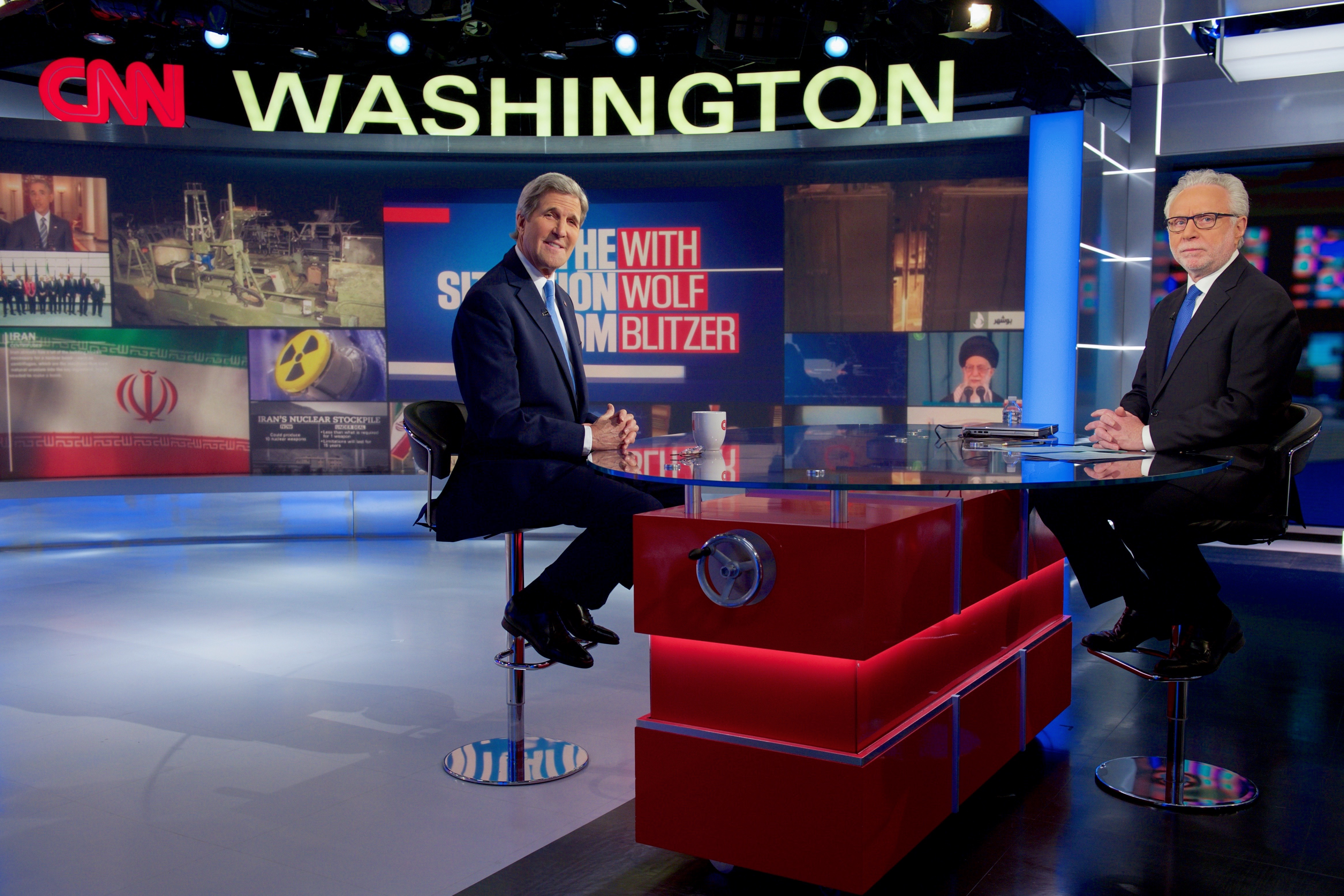
Secretary of State John Kerry with Wolf Blitzer on January 18, 2016

In January 2021, CNN announced that The Situation Room would be shortened from two hours to one hour at 6 p.m. ET, with The Lead with Jake Tapper expanding into what was formerly its first hour.

On January 23, 2025, it was announced that The Situation Room would add Pamela Brown as a co-anchor, and be moved to a new two-hour, morning timeslot from 10 a.m. to 12 p.m. ET. The schedule change displaced hours of CNN Newsroom that had been hosted by Jim Acosta and Pamela Brown respectively. The changes took effect on March 3, 2025, as part of a larger revamp of CNN's daytime lineup.

Preceded by CNN News Central	CNN Weekday lineup 10:00 am – 12:00 pm	Succeeded by Inside Politics
