= CNN =

American news channel

- Logo used since 2014
- Country: United States
- Broadcast area: United States; Canada; Brazil; Japan; India; Caribbean islands; Worldwide (via CNN International)
- Headquarters: Ted Turner Campus Atlanta, Georgia, United States; 30 Hudson Yards New York City, United States

Programming
- Language: English
- Picture format: 1080i (HDTV) (downscaled to letterboxed 480i for the SDTV feed)

Ownership
- Owner: Skydance
- Parent: CNN Worldwide
- Key people: Sir Mark Thompson (Chairman and CEO); David Leavy (COO); Michael Bass (EVP of Programming, CNN-US); Brad Ferrer (EVP/CFO); Amy Entelis (EVP); Ken Jautz (EVP, CNN-US and HLN); Andrew Morse (EVP/Chief Digital Officer)
- Sister channels: List: CNN Airport (defunct); CNN Arabic; CNN Brazil; CNN Chile; CNN en Español; CNN Indonesia; CNN International; CNN-News18; CNN Portugal; CNN Türk; HLN; CNN Prima News; A2 CNN; Antena 3 CNN

History
- Launched: June 1, 1980; 46 years ago
- Founder: Ted Turner; Reese Schonfeld

Links
- Website: cnn.com

Availability

Streaming media
- Online stream: CNN Live (pay-TV subscribers only)
- Affiliated Streaming Service: HBO Max
- Service(s): DirecTV Stream, Hulu + Live TV, Sling TV, YouTube TV

Cable News Network, Inc. (CNN) is an American multinational news media company and the flagship namesake property of CNN Worldwide, a division of Skydance. Founded on June 1, 1980, by American media proprietor Ted Turner and Reese Schonfeld as a 24-hour cable news channel and headquartered in Atlanta, Georgia, CNN is the first television channel to provide 24-hour news coverage and the first all-news television channel in the United States.

As of December 2023, CNN had 68,974,000 television households as subscribers in the United States, according to Nielsen. This is down from 80 million in March 2021. In June 2021, CNN ranked third in viewership among cable news networks, behind Fox News and MS NOW (formerly MSNBC), averaging 580,000 viewers throughout the day, down 49% from a year earlier, amid sharp declines in viewers across all cable news networks. While CNN ranked 14th among all basic cable networks in 2019, then jumped to 7th during a major surge for the three largest cable news networks (completing a rankings streak of Fox News at number 5 and MS NOW at number 6 for that year), it settled back to number 11 in 2021 and had further declined to number 21 in 2022.

Globally, CNN programming has aired through CNN International, seen by viewers in over 212 countries and territories. Since May 2019, however, the American domestic version has absorbed international news coverage in order to reduce programming costs. The American version, sometimes referred to as CNN (US), is also available in Canada, Japan, and some islands in the Caribbean. CNN also licenses its brand and content to other channels, such as CNN-News18 in India. In Japan it broadcasts CNNj which started in 2003, with simultaneous translation in Japanese.

CNN has often been subjected to criticism from conservative media and other organizations for having a perceived left-wing bias; conversely, it has also been criticized for perceived false balance in support of conservative positions.

== History ==
Former headquarters of CNN Worldwide in CNN Center, Atlanta

The Cable News Network launched at 6:00 p.m. Eastern Time on June 1, 1980. After an introduction by Ted Turner, the husband and wife team of David Walker and Lois Hart anchored the channel's first newscast. Burt Reinhardt, the executive vice president of CNN, hired most of the channel's first 200 employees, including the network's first news anchor, former ABC News Capitol Hill senior correspondent Bernard Shaw.

Current headquarters of CNN Worldwide in Ted Turner Campus, Atlanta

Since its debut, CNN has expanded its reach to several cable and satellite television providers, websites, and specialized closed-circuit channels (such as CNN Airport). The company has 42 bureaus (12 domestic, 31 international), more than 900 affiliated local stations (which also receive news and features content via the video newswire service CNN Newsource), and several regional and foreign-language networks around the world. The channel's success made a bona-fide mogul of founder Ted Turner and set the stage for conglomerate Time Warner's (later WarnerMedia which merged with Discovery Inc. forming Warner Bros. Discovery) eventual acquisition of the Turner Broadcasting System in 1996.

== Programming ==
=== Current schedule ===
CNN's current weekday schedule consists mostly of rolling news programming during daytime hours, followed by in-depth news and information programs with a focus on political news and discussion during the evening and primetime hours. The network's morning programming consists of a simulcast of CNN Headline Express at 5:00 a.m. ET, followed by CNN This Morning, hosted by Audie Cornish, at 6 a.m. ET. Since April 2023, CNN News Central has served as the network's rolling news block on weekdays, with a morning edition anchored by John Berman, Kate Bolduan, and Sara Sidner from 7 a.m–10 a.m., and an afternoon edition from 1–4 p.m. ET anchored by Brianna Keilar and Boris Sanchez. The gap between the two editions of News Central is filled by The Situation Room with Wolf Blitzer and Pamela Brown, and Inside Politics with Dana Bash in the noon hour. CNN's late afternoon and early evening lineup consists of The Arena with Kasie Hunt followed at 5 p.m. by The Lead with Jake Tapper.

The network's evening and prime time lineup from at 7 p.m. onward is devoted towards personality-based discussion programs. including Erin Burnett OutFront, Anderson Cooper 360°, The Source with Kaitlan Collins, CNN NewsNight with Abby Phillip, and Laura Coates Live. The East Coast late-night hours were previously filled by reruns of prime time programs; in October 2025, the network introduced a live program anchored from Los Angeles, The Story Is with Elex Michaelson, which airs from 9–11 p.m. PT (12 a.m–2 a.m. ET).

Weekend programming follows a different schedule, with the morning show CNN This Morning Weekend with Victor Blackwell, followed on Saturday mornings by Smerconish with Michael Smerconish, Table for Five, and The Amanpour Hour with Christiane Amanpour. The Sunday morning lineup consists primarily of political talk shows, including Inside Politics with Manu Raju. State of the Union with Jake Tapper and Dana Bash, and the international affairs program Fareed Zakaria GPS. Weekend afternoons are filled by the rolling news block CNN Newsroom (which was formerly used on weekdays before its replacement with News Central).

The prime time schedule on weekends is dedicated primarily to factual programming, such as documentary films, miniseries, and specials relating to current affairs, politics, and popular culture (some of which acquired and presented under the CNN Films banner), as well as reality-style docuseries.

=== Past programming ===
For the 2014–15 season, after canceling Piers Morgan Tonight (which, itself, replaced the long-running Larry King Live), CNN experimented with running factual and reality-style programming during the 9:00 p.m. ET hour, such as John Walsh's The Hunt, This Is Life with Lisa Ling, and Mike Rowe's Somebody's Gotta Do It. Then-president Jeff Zucker explained that this new lineup was intended to shift CNN away from a reliance on pundit-oriented programs, and attract younger demographics to the network. Zucker stated that the 9:00 p.m. hour could be pre-empted during major news events for expanded coverage. These changes coincided with the introduction of a new imaging campaign for the network, featuring the slogan "Go there". In May 2014, CNN premiered The Sixties, a documentary miniseries produced by Tom Hanks, and Gary Goetzman which chronicled the United States in the 1960s. Owing to its success, CNN commissioned follow-ups focusing on other decades. Anderson Cooper 360° was expanded to run two hours long, from 8 p.m. to 10 p.m.

By 2019, CNN had produced at least 35 original series. Alongside the Hanks/Goetzman franchise (including the 2018 spin-off 1968), CNN has aired other documentary miniseries relating to news and US policies, such as The Bush Years, and American Dynasties: The Kennedys—which saw the highest ratings of any CNN original series premiere to-date, with 1.7 million viewers. Parts Unknown concluded after the 2018 suicide of its host Anthony Bourdain; CNN announced several new miniseries and docuseries for 2019, including American Style (a miniseries produced by the digital media company Vox Media), The Redemption Project with Van Jones, Chasing Life with Sanjay Gupta, Tricky Dick (a miniseries chronicling Richard Nixon), The Movies (a spin-off of the Hanks/Goetzman decades miniseries), and Once in a Great City: Detroit 1962–64.

With the takeover of CNN by Chris Licht and Warner Bros. Discovery, it was announced in October 2022 that CNN would cut back on acquisitions and commissions from third-parties as a cost-cutting measure, but Licht stressed that "long-form content remains an important pillar of our programming", while the network announced a slate for 2023 that would include commissions such as Giuliani: What Happened to America's Mayor?, United States of Scandal, and The 2010s. In May 2024, CNN ordered an American version of the long-running British news comedy panel show Have I Got News for You.

=== On-air presentation ===
CNN began broadcasting in the high-definition 1080i resolution format in September 2007. This format is now standard for CNN and is available on all major cable and satellite providers.

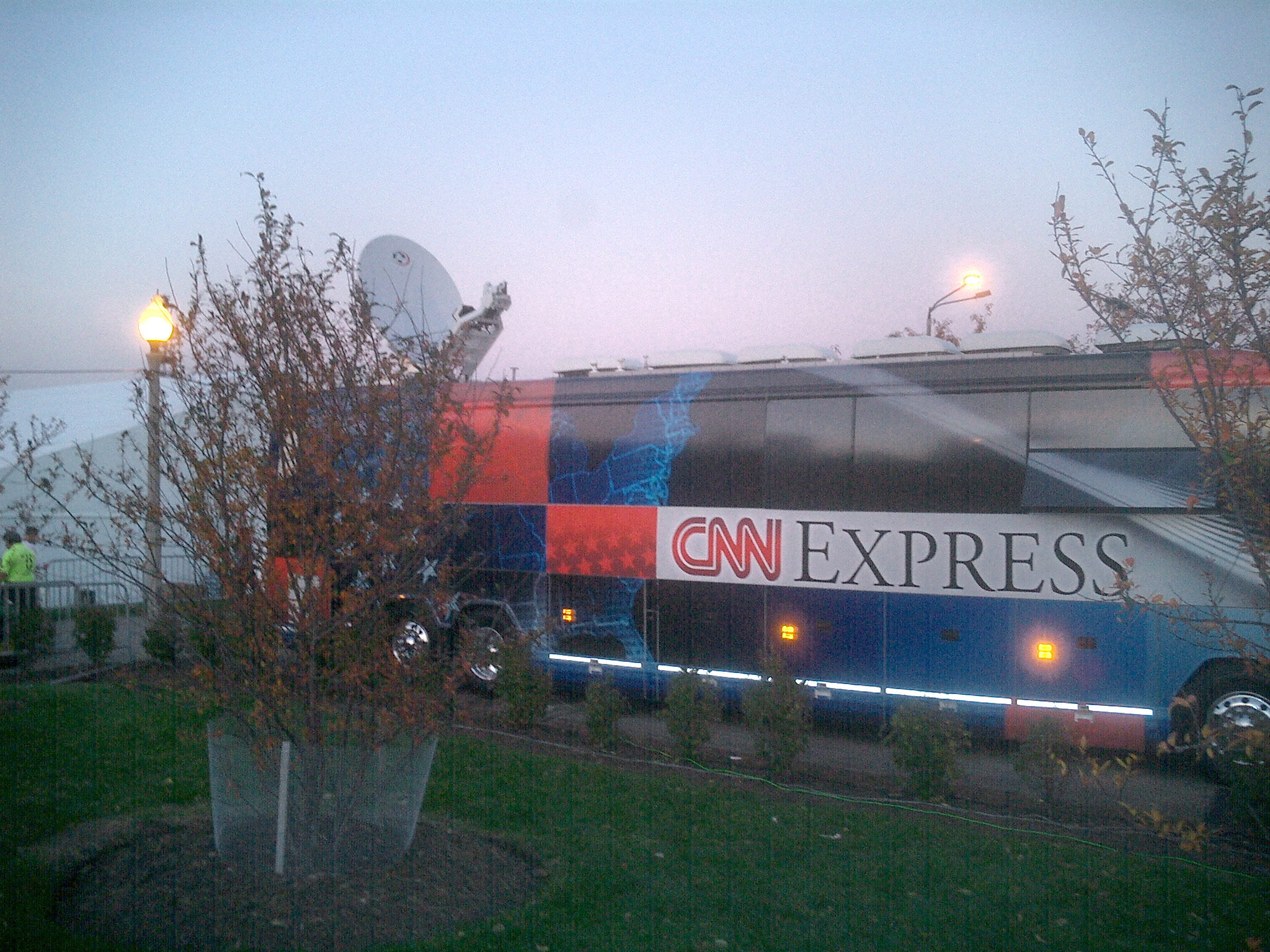
The CNN Election Express bus, used for broadcasts

CNN's political coverage in HD was first given mobility by the introduction of the CNN Election Express bus in October 2007. The Election Express vehicle, capable of five simultaneous HD feeds, was used for the channel's CNN-YouTube presidential debates and for presidential candidate interviews.

In December 2008, CNN introduced a comprehensive redesign of its on-air appearance, which replaced an existing style that had been used since 2004. On-air graphics took a rounded, flat look in a predominantly black, white, and red color scheme, and the introduction of a new box next to the CNN logo for displaying show logos and segment-specific graphics, rather than as a large banner above the lower third. The redesign also replaced the scrolling ticker with a static "flipper", which could either display a feed of news headlines (both manually inserted and taken from the RSS feeds of CNN.com), or "topical" details related to a story.

CNN's next major redesign was introduced on January 10, 2011, replacing the dark, flat appearance of the 2008 look with a glossier, blue-and-white color scheme, moving the secondary logo box to the opposite end of the screen, and framing its graphics for the 16:9 aspect ratio (which is downscaled to a letterboxed format for standard definition feeds). On February 18, 2013, following Jeff Zucker's arrival as head of the network, the "flipper" was dropped and reverted to a scrolling ticker.

On August 11, 2014, CNN introduced a new graphics package, dropping the glossy appearance for a flat, rectangular scheme incorporating red, white, and black colors, and the Gotham typeface. The ticker alternated between general headlines and financial news from CNN Business, and the secondary logo box was replaced with a smaller box below the CNN bug, which displayed either the title, hashtag, or Twitter handle for the show being aired or its anchor. In April 2016, CNN began to introduce a new corporate typeface designed by Monotype Imaging, known as "CNN Sans", across all of its platforms. Inspired by Helvetica Neue and commissioned after consultations with Troika Design Group, the font family consists of 30 different versions with varying weights and widths to facilitate use across print, television, and digital mediums. CNN International would also adopt these graphics, but with the CNN logo bug having a white on red color scheme to differentiate it from the domestic network.

In August 2016, CNN announced the launch of CNN Aerial Imagery and Reporting (CNN AIR), a drone-based news collecting operation to integrate aerial imagery and reporting across all CNN branches and platforms, along with Turner Broadcasting and Time Warner entities.

On June 1, 2023, CNN refreshed its graphics to mark the 43rd anniversary of its launch, using gradients and rounded corners, thinner fonts, and a modified layout that moved the show title to a secondary tab on the lower third next to the segment title, and replaced the ticker with a static "flipper" for the first time since 2013, among other changes. Amid poor internal reception to the redesign and the firing of Chris Licht as head of CNN, elements of the prior graphics began to be reinstated later that month, including the bolder typography previously used for lower third headlines. Further changes were made on August 14, 2023, with the return of the scrolling ticker and the show title box to make it closer resemble the 2014–23 graphics, but maintaining most of the other visual changes.

On June 27, 2024, CNN hosted the first presidential debate for former President Donald Trump and President Joe Biden. CNN claimed that more people watched the CNN Presidential Debate than any other CNN program in history.

== Staff ==
On July 27, 2012, CNN president Jim Walton announced he was resigning after 30 years at the network. Walton remained with CNN until the end of that year. In January 2013, former NBCUniversal President Jeff Zucker replaced Walton.

On January 29, 2013, longtime political analysts James Carville and Mary Matalin, and fellow political contributor Erick Erickson were let go by CNN.

In February 2022, Zucker was asked to resign by Jason Kilar, the chief executive of CNN's owner WarnerMedia, after Zucker's relationship with one of his lieutenants was discovered during the investigation into former CNN primetime host Chris Cuomo's efforts to control potentially damaging reporting regarding his brother Andrew Cuomo, governor of New York. Kilar announced that the interim co-heads would be executive vice presidents Michael Bass, Amy Entelis, and Ken Jautz. On February 26, 2022, it was announced that Chris Licht—known for his work at MSNBC and CBS—would be the next president of CNN; he was planned to be instated after the spin off and merger of WarnerMedia into Discovery Inc. Licht started his tenure in May 2022, and his tenure ended in June 2023. He expressed an intention to have more Republicans on the air and to cut down on opinion-related content.

A trio of EVPs, Entelis, Virginia Moseley and Eric Sherling, formed an interim management group, until October 2023, when Mark Thompson, formerly of The New York Times, became CEO. In one of his first major moves, he kept the executive team under Chris Licht—the "Quad", composed of David Leavy, COO, and three EVPs (Moseley for editorial, Entelis for talent, and Sherling for programming)— all in place, and expanded their responsibilities. Moseley became the network's first executive editor and would have both national and international news. Adding their ranks, Thompson made Alex MacCallum, who worked with Thompson at The New York Times, executive vice president of digital products. In highlighting these moves, Thompson emphasized existing staff would need to get used to change.

In July 2024, CNN announced that it was cutting one hundred jobs, or about 3% of its total workforce. The company also announced that it was consolidating three newsrooms into one, namely, its US news gathering, international news gathering and digital news gathering operations. CNN's global workforce, in July 2024, included roughly 3,500 people.

== Other platforms ==
=== Website ===
CNN launched its website, CNN.com (initially known as CNN Interactive), on August 30, 1995. The site attracted growing interest over its first decade and is now one of the most popular news websites in the world. The widespread growth of blogs, social media and user-generated content have influenced the site, and blogs, in particular, have focused CNN's previously scattershot online offerings, most noticeably in the development and launch of CNN Pipeline in late 2005.

In April 2009, CNN.com ranked third place among online global news sites in unique users in the US, according to Nielsen/NetRatings; this is an increase of 11% over the previous year.

CNN Pipeline was the name of a paid subscription service, its corresponding website, and a content delivery client that provided streams of live video from up to four sources (or "pipes"), on-demand access to CNN stories and reports, and optional pop-up "news alerts" to computer users. The installable client was available to users of PCs running Microsoft Windows. There was also a browser-based "web client" that did not require installation. The service was discontinued in July 2007, and was replaced with a free streaming service.

On April 18, 2008, CNN.com was targeted by Chinese hackers in retaliation for the channel's coverage on the 2008 Tibetan unrest. CNN reported that they took preventive measures after news broke of the impending attack.

The company was honored at the 2008 Technology & Engineering Emmy Awards for development and implementation of an integrated and portable IP-based live, edit and store-and-forward digital news gathering (DNG) system. The first use of what would later win CNN this award was in April 2001 when CNN correspondent Lisa Rose Weaver covered, and was detained, for the release of the US Navy crew of a damaged electronic surveillance plane after the Hainan Island incident. The technology consisted of a videophone produced by 7E Communications Ltd of London, UK.

On October 24, 2009, CNN launched a new version of the CNN.com website; the revamped site included the addition of a new "sign up" option, in which users can create their own username and profile, and a new "CNN Pulse" (beta) feature, along with a new red color theme. However, most of the news stories archived on the website were deleted.

=== Blogs ===
The topical news program Judy Woodruff's Inside Politics was the first CNN program to feature a round-up of blogs in 2005. In 2006, CNN launched CNN Exchange and CNN iReport, initiatives designed to further introduce and centralize the impact of everything from blogging to citizen journalism within the CNN brand. CNN iReport which features user-submitted photos and video, has achieved considerable traction, with increasingly professional-looking reports filed by amateur journalists, many still in high school or college. The iReport gained more prominence when observers of the Virginia Tech shootings sent in first-hand photos of what was going on during the shootings.

In April 2010, CNN announced via Twitter that it would launch a food blog called "Eatocracy", which will "cover all news related to food—from recalls to health issues to culture". CNN had an internet relay chat (IRC) network at chat.cnn.com. CNN placed a live chat with Benjamin Netanyahu on the network in 1998.

CNNHealth consists of expert doctors answering viewers' questions online at CNN's "The Chart" blog website. Contributors include Sanjay Gupta (Chief Medical Correspondent), Charles Raison (Mental Health Expert), Otis Brawley (Conditions Expert), Melina Jampolis (Diet and Fitness Expert), Jennifer Shu (Living Well Expert), and Elizabeth Cohen (Senior Medical Correspondent).

=== Other digital offerings ===
In early 2008, CNN began maintaining a live streaming broadcast available to cable and satellite subscribers who receive CNN at home (a precursor to the TV Everywhere services that would become popularized by cable and satellite providers beginning with Time Warner's incorporation of the medium). CNN International is broadcast live, as part of the RealNetworks SuperPass subscription service outside the US. CNN also offers several RSS feeds and podcasts.

CNN manages the YouTube channels "CNN" and "CNN-News18", which ranked among the 20 most subscribed news publishers in January 2025, with 17.4 million and 8.8 million subscribers respectively. In 2014, CNN launched a radio version of their television programming on TuneIn Radio.

On March 7, 2017, CNN announced the official launch of its virtual reality unit named CNNVR. It will produce 360 videos to its Android and iOS apps within CNN Digital. It is planning to cover major news events with the online, and digital news team in New York City, Atlanta, London, Hong Kong, San Francisco, Dubai, Johannesburg, Tokyo, and Beijing.

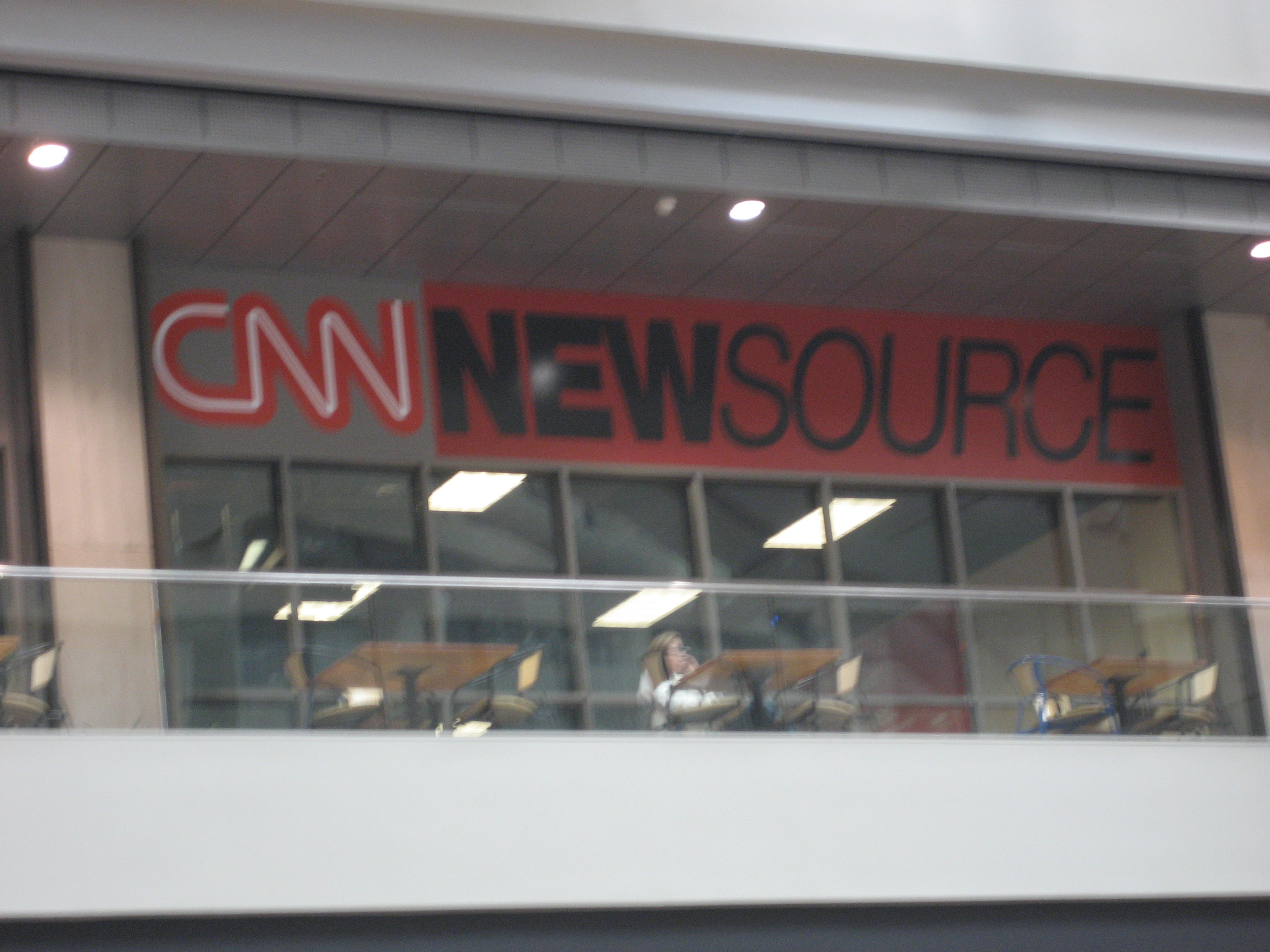
CNN Newsource offices at the CNN Center in Atlanta

CNN Newsource is a subscription-based affiliation video service that provides CNN content to television station affiliates with CNN, including terrestrial stations and international stations. Newsource allows affiliates to download videos from CNN, as well as from other affiliates who upload their video to Newsource.

CNN also maintains a wire service known as CNN Wire.

In addition to news articles, CNN produces articles and videos that recommend products for consumers to purchase, in a category of content branded as CNN Underscored. CNN Underscored operates separately from CNN's newsroom. CNN says the editors and writers use their own judgment about which products they choose to promote, but their recommendations are published with links to where the recommended products can be purchased, and they collect revenue from the sellers when people use those links.

In 2021, CNN Digital had an average of 144 million unique visitors in the United States according to Comscore, making it the most viewed digital news outlet, ahead of The New York Times, NBC News, Fox News, The Washington Post.

==== CNN 10 ====
The network also hosts CNN 10, a daily 10-minute video show visible at the CNN website or YouTube. It replaced the long-running show CNN Student News which had been aired since 1989. It is aimed at a global audience of students, teachers, and adults. First hosted by Carl Azuz, then in the fall of 2022 replaced by Coy Wire. Carl Azuz left CNN due to a "personal decision" according to a CNN spokesperson in a newsletter published on September 18, 2022.

=== Beme ===
On November 28, 2016, CNN announced the acquisition of Beme for a reported $25 million. On November 29, 2016, Matt Hackett, co-founder of Beme, announced via an email to its users that the Beme app would be shutting down on January 31, 2017. Since the shutdown of the app, it was announced that CNN intended to use the current talent behind Beme to work on a separate start-up endeavor. Beme's current team will retain full creative control of the new project, which was slated to be released in the summer of 2017. Beme have also brought on other internet stars such as the host of Vsauce 3, Jake Roper, as head of production, who features prominently in Beme co-founder Casey Neistat's vlogs. Beme News has since begun uploading news related video on YouTube.

=== Films ===
In October 2012, CNN formed a film division called CNN Films to distribute and produce made-for-TV and feature documentaries. Its first acquisition was a documentary entitled Girl Rising, a documentary narrated by Meryl Streep that focused on the struggles of girls' education.

=== Radio ===
In July 2014, Cumulus Media announced that it would end its partnership with ABC News Radio, and enter into a new partnership with CNN to syndicate national and international news content for its stations through Westwood One beginning in 2015, including access to a wire service, and digital content for its station websites. The service was unbranded, allowing individual stations to integrate the content with their news brands. On July 9, 2020, citing "extraordinary circumstances in the current marketplace" and a need to prioritize the company's resources, Westwood One announced that the service would be discontinued on August 30.

The audio simulcast of CNN is distributed on the Audacy website and app.

== Other channels ==
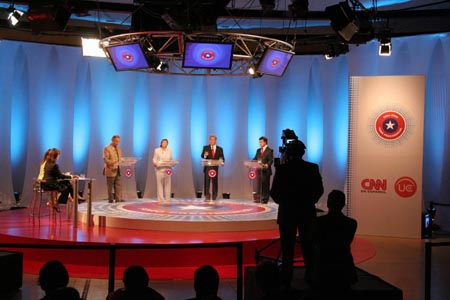
CNN en Español televised debate for the 2005 Chilean elections

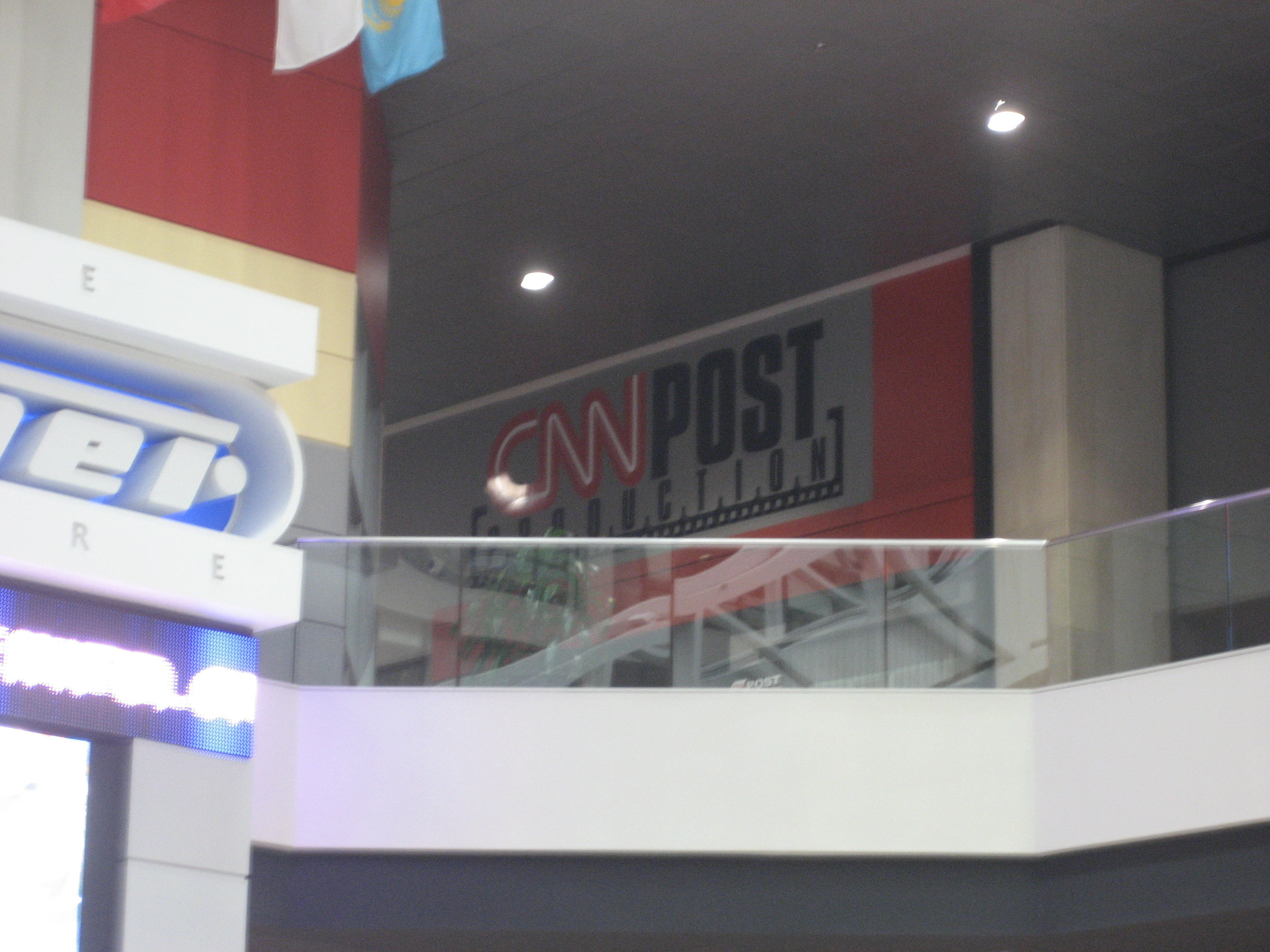
Post-production editing offices in Atlanta

Over the years, CNN has launched spin-off networks in the United States and other countries. Channels that currently operate include:

- CNN Brazil – a Brazilian news channel that launched on March 15, 2020. (licensed to Novus Media)
- CNN Chile – a Chilean news channel that launched on December 4, 2008.
- CNN en Español
- CNN International
- CNN Türk – a Turkish media outlet (licensed to Demirören Group)
- CNN-News18 – an Indian news channel. (licensed to Network 18)
- CNN Indonesia – an Indonesian news channel that launched on August 17, 2015. (licensed to Trans Media)
- CNNj – a Japanese news outlet
  - CNN/US HD – launched for American viewers in late 2010, and is distributed by Japan Cable Television (JCTV) to several different multi-channel TV providers, such as J:COM, SKY PerfecTV!, iTSCOM and the JCTVWiFi service.
- CNN Prima News – a Czech news channel. (launched on May 3, 2020, licensed to Prima Group)
- A2 CNN – an Albanian news channel
- Antena 3 CNN – a Romanian news channel. (licensed to Intact Media Group)
- HLN – a US basic cable channel (formerly called CNN2 and CNN Headline News)
- CNN Portugal – a Portuguese news channel launched on November 22, 2021. (Licensed to Media Capital)
- CNN Headlines – Free, ad-supported television channel with 24/7 fast-paced news and short form stories, available in certain territories on Samsung TV Plus, Rakuten TV, LG Channels and Pluto TV.

=== Former channels ===
CNN has also launched television and online ventures that are no longer in operation, including:

- CNN Airport
- CNN Checkout Channel (out-of-home place-based custom channel for grocery stores that started in 1991 and shuttered in 1993)
- CNN-D (a German news programming block that aired through CNN International's TV signal in Germany between 1997 and 2003.)
- CNN Italia (an Italian news website launched in partnership with the publishing company Gruppo Editoriale L'Espresso, and after with the financial newspaper Il Sole 24 Ore, it launched on November 15, 1999 and closed on September 12, 2003)
- CNN Pipeline (24-hour multi-channel broadband online news service, replaced with CNN.com Live)
- CNN Sports Illustrated (also known as CNNSI; US sports news channel, closed in 2002)
- CNN+ (a partner channel in Spain, launched in 1999 joint venture with Sogecable).
- CNN.com Live
- CNNfn (financial channel, closed in December 2004)
- CNN Max – a linear streaming channel exclusively for subscribers to Warner Bros. Discovery's Max that mirrored much, but not all, of the main CNN channel's programming; discontinued on November 17, 2025
- CNN Money Switzerland (Switzerland financial channel, joint venture with MediaGo)
- CNN Philippines – an English-language Filipino news channel launched on March 16, 2015; and closed on January 31, 2024 (licensed to Nine Media Corporation and Radio Philippines Network (RPN))
- Great Big Story – launched in 2015 for younger viewers, shut down in September 2020 after gaining nearly six million followers on both Facebook and YouTube.

== Bureaus ==
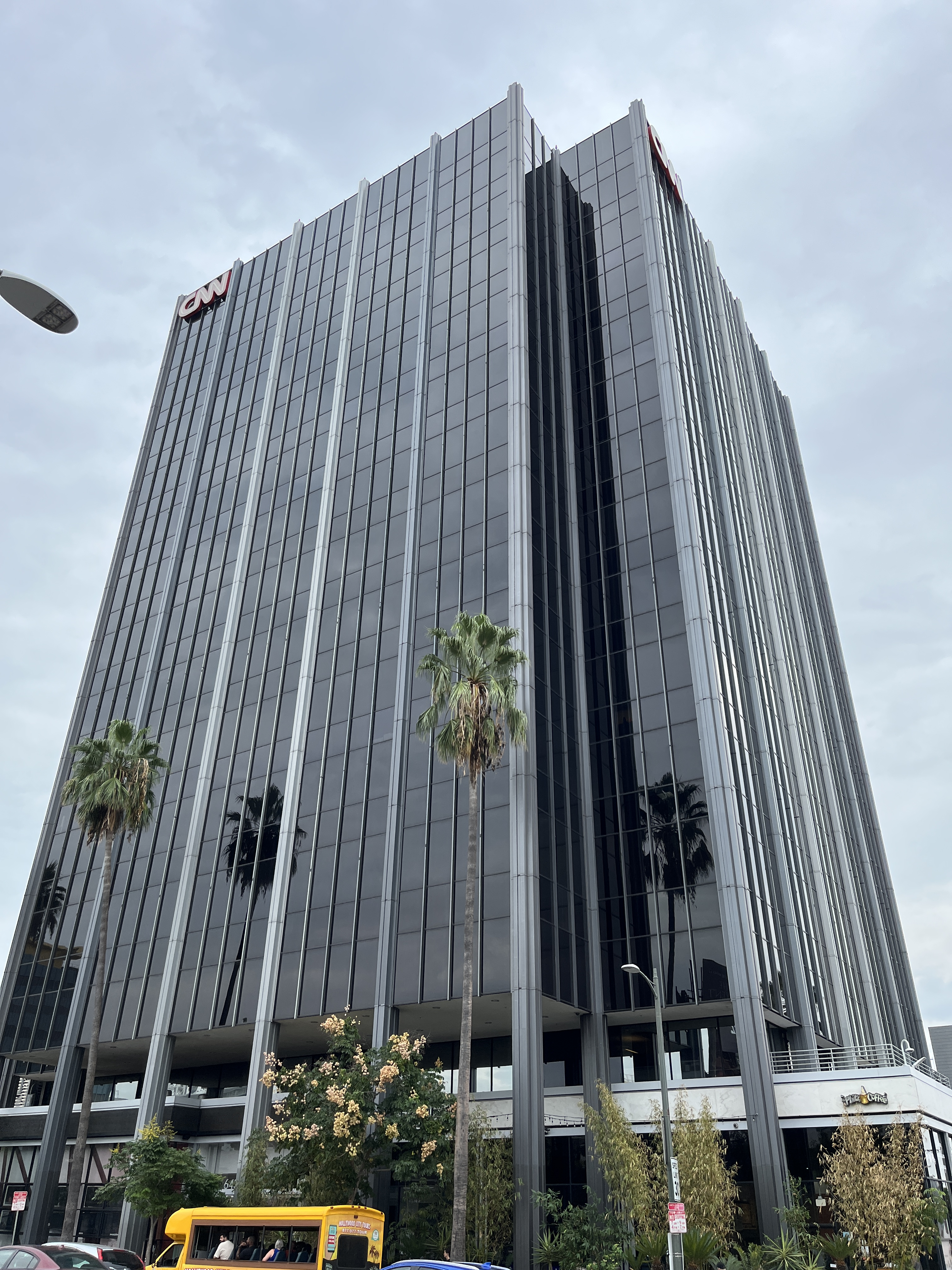
CNN in Los Angeles

CNN has 37 bureaus worldwide.

== Controversies and criticisms ==
CNN has been involved in various controversies, criticisms, and allegations since its inception in 1980. The channel is known for its dramatic live coverage of breaking news, some of which has drawn criticism as overly sensationalistic.

CNN claims to be "The Most Trusted Name in News", but its efforts to be nonpartisan have led to accusations of both liberal bias and well as false balance in support of conservatives. One study measured airtime of guests on major news networks between 2010 and 2021 and compared that to the guests' campaign donations. It found guests on CNN to have a liberal bias (a "campaign finance score" of −9.7, where 0 is equal airtime, compared to −14.1 for MSNBC and 49.8 for Fox News), which became more pronounced during the Trump administration. The same study found that some popular primetime news shows on CNN, such as Anderson Cooper 360 or CNN Tonight, are more left-leaning than popular MSNBC shows such as The Rachel Maddow Show or The 11th Hour with Brian Williams.

In January 2020, CNN settled a multi-million dollar defamation lawsuit from Nick Sandmann, a Covington Catholic High School student involved in an encounter with Omaha tribe elder Nathan Phillips at the Lincoln Memorial in Washington, D.C.

After being fired in December 2021, former host Chris Cuomo was reported to be seeking $125 million in damages, alleging a breach of agreement. In April 2023, host Don Lemon announced that he had been fired.

During the ongoing war between Israel and Hamas, CNN has been accused by its own staff of producing biased coverage that privileges the Israeli point of view to such an extent that it ends up parroting pro-Israeli propaganda, and of applying tight restrictions on citing Hamas or Palestinian voices in general.

== Awards and honors ==
1998: CNN received the Four Freedoms Award for the Freedom of Speech.

2017: CNN received the Prince Rainier III Special Prize at the Monte Carlo TV Festival for the documentary, Midway: A Plastic Island about sea pollution.

2018: CNN received the Overseas Press Club of America David Kaplan Award for best TV or video spot news reporting from abroad for reporting on the fall of ISIS by Nick Paton Walsh and Arwa Damon.

2018: CNN received the George Polk Award of Long Island University for Foreign Television Reporting for uncovering a hidden modern-day slave auction of African refugees in Libya. Reporting done by Nima Elbagir and Raja Razek.

2018: CNN's Nima Elbagir received the Courage in Journalism Award from the International Women's Media Foundation.

2018: CNN won a network-record six News and Documentary Emmy Awards of the National Academy of Television Arts and Sciences, for Outstanding Breaking News Coverage, Outstanding Continuing Coverage of a News Story in a Newscast, Outstanding Live Interview, Outstanding Hard News Feature Story in a Newscast, Outstanding News Special, Outstanding Science, Medical and Environmental Report.

2019: The USC Annenberg School awarded CNN with a Walter Cronkite Award for its Parkland Town Hall event.

2020: CNN's Ed Lavandera was awarded a Peabody Award for "The Hidden Workforce: Undocumented in America", and CNN Films was awarded a Peabody for the documentary "Apollo 11".

2021: CNN won a George Polk Award of Long Island University for Foreign Reporting for their reporting on the coronavirus outbreak in Wuhan, China, and later reporting under quarantine in Beijing.

2021: CNN and Clarissa Ward were named finalists for the DuPont-Columbia Award of the Columbia University Graduate School of Journalism for their "Russia's Secret Influence Campaigns" investigation.

== See also ==
- Broadcasting
- FOX News
- History of CNN
- Journalistic objectivity
- List of CNN personnel
- Mass media
- Media bias in the United States
- News media
- News media in the United States
- Radio Maria
- Television studio
