= CNN International =

International news television channel

- Country: United States
- Broadcast area: Worldwide (also available in hotels and onboard cruise ships)
- Headquarters: Ted Turner Campus, 1050 Techwood Drive, Atlanta, Georgia; New York City; London; Hong Kong; Mumbai; Abu Dhabi

Programming
- Language: English
- Picture format: 1080p HDTV (downscaled to 480i/576i for the SDTV feed)

Ownership
- Owner: Skydance
- Parent: CNN Worldwide
- Key people: Mark Thompson, Chairman and CEO, CNN Worldwide; Mike McCarthy (EVP/GM, CNN International)
- Sister channels: CNN; HLN; CNN-News18; CNN en Español; CNN Chile; CNNj; CNN Indonesia; CNN Prima News; CNN Brazil; CNN Portugal; CNN Arabic; CNN Türk; A2 CNN; Antena 3 CNN

History
- Launched: September 1, 1985; 41 years ago
- Former names: CNN Europe

Links
- Website: edition.cnn.com TV schedule (Asia); TV schedule (Europe); TV schedule (Americas) (Philippines)

Availability

Terrestrial
- DTT (Andorra): Channel 36
- Boxer TV Access (Sweden): Channel 26
- Oqaab (Afghanistan): Channel 66
- Digitenne (Netherlands): Channel 30 (HD) / Channel 61 (KPN)
- GOtv (Sub-Saharan Africa): Channel 72
- DStv (Sub-Saharan Africa): Channel 401
- Azam TV (East Africa): Channel 239
- Cignal TV (Philippines): Channel 130

Streaming media
- CNN.com/live (U.K.): Watch live (UK only, free preview and then subscription required)
- CNN.com/live (U.S.): Watch live (U.S. pay TV subscribers only; requires login from participating television providers to access stream)
- Hulu + Live TV (U.S.): Internet Protocol television
- Joyn (Germany, 720p50): free live stream login required
- CNN.com Worldwide: Watch Live (Worldwide)

Cable News Network International or CNN International (CNNi, simply branded on-air as CNN) is an international television channel and website, owned by CNN Worldwide. CNN International carries news-related programming worldwide; it cooperates with sister network CNN's national and international news bureaus. Unlike its sister channel, CNN, a North American-only subscription service, CNN International is carried on a variety of TV platforms across the world, and broadcast from studios inside and outside the United States, in Atlanta, New York City, London, Mumbai, Hong Kong, and Abu Dhabi. In some countries, it is available as a free-to-air network. The service is aimed at the overseas market, competing with country specific channels.

== History ==
=== Early years ===
CNN International logo from 1985 to 1995

CNN International began broadcasting on September 1, 1985, at first primarily broadcasting to American business travelers in hotels. The first studio for CNNi was at CNN's original studio building known as Techwood, home at that time to all of Turner Broadcasting System's channels. Today, it is home to the Techwood Studios complex that houses the entertainment channels. Other early studios in Atlanta were tucked away in various corners of the CNN Center, and the newsroom lacked even a digital clock. The vast majority of the network's programming originally consisted of simulcasts of the two domestic CNN channels (CNN/US and Headline News). In the United Kingdom, the channel began broadcasting on September 17, 1987, the office was located at 25/28 Old Burlington Street, London. In 1990, however, the amount of news programming produced by CNNi especially for international viewers increased significantly.

Paul Vessey, an executive of CNN International, said in 1992 that CNN would go international style and get "less and less American".

A new newsroom and studio complex was built in 1994, as CNN decided to compete against BBC World Service Television's news programming. CNNi emerged as an internationally oriented news channel, with staff members of various national backgrounds, even though some accusations of a pro-U.S. editorial bias persist. CNN International was awarded the Liberty Medal on July 4, 1997. Ted Turner, in accepting the medal on behalf of the network, said: "My idea was, we're just going to give people the facts... We didn't have to show liberty and democracy as good and show socialism or totalitarianism as bad. If we just showed them both the way they were ... everybody's going to choose liberty and democracy."

=== New international era (1995–2005) ===
In 1995, creative director Morgan Almeida defined a progressive rebranding strategy, to target CNNi's diverse global market, making the on-air look less overtly American and with a cleaner, simpler "international" aesthetic going forward. The word "International" in the channel's logo was replaced with a globe, and the new branding featured numerous international locations filmed in time-lapse, channel idents created in CGI with Velvet Design in Munich, and a news brand designed with The Attik in New York.

The regionalization of CNN International was through the efforts of Chris Cramer, joining CNN in 1996. CNN International was split into three feeds – Asia, Europe/Africa/Middle East and Latin America. By 1998, CNN International produced 90% of its content, up from 50% in 1996. The rest of the percentage is for domestic CNN broadcasts from the United States. According to an annual PAX survey, in 1998 and 1999 CNN International was the leading cable and satellite network in Asia in terms of viewership among affluent households and among business decision-makers. CNN International planned to air shows in 1999 including World Beat, its popular weekly international music segment, and the global arts round-up Art Club. The channel was banned in China in June 1999, on the tenth anniversary of the Tianamnen Square massacre.

=== 2006–2009 revamp ===
CNN International logo from January 1, 2006, to September 21, 2009

The network undertook another major rebranding effort in 2006 overseen by Mark Wright and London agency Kemistry. The ticker was replaced by a flipper, on-screen graphics were more unified and from October 2007 until August 2008, new studios were progressively rolled out. However, on January 1, 2009, CNN International adopted the "lower-thirds" that CNN/US had introduced a month earlier which was inspired by the clean modern design of the CNNi rebrand efforts.

In the U.S., CNNi North America was distributed overnight and on weekends over the CNNfn financial channel, until that channel's demise in December 2004. It is now available as a standalone, full-time channel, usually as part of high-tier packages of subscription providers including Time Warner Cable, AT&T U-Verse, Verizon FiOS and Cox Communications.

Former CNN Beijing and Tokyo bureau chief Rebecca MacKinnon described how the news-gathering priorities of CNN International were skewed to "produce stories and reports that would be of interest to CNN USA." Nevertheless, Jane Arraf, a former correspondent who was with the Council on Foreign Relations and later served as a Middle East-based correspondent for Al Jazeera English, noted that when she spoke on international affairs, CNN International would usually give her more airtime than CNN/US. For its part, former CNN executive Eason Jordan has defended CNN International's "international" perspective, saying "No matter what CNN International does, as long as CNN's headquarters is in the United States people are going to say, well, it's an American service. But the reality is that it's an international service based in the United States, and we don't make any apologies about that."

=== Going beyond borders (2009–2013) ===
From January until September 2009, CNN International adopted more programs that became geared towards a primetime European audience with a few titled after CNN International personalities, most notably the interview program Amanpour. On September 21, 2009, the channel launched a new tagline "Go Beyond Borders", along with a new logo, and consolidated its general newscasts (World News, CNN Today, World News Asia, World News Europe and Your World Today) into a single newscast entitled World Report.

The slogan "Go Beyond Borders" emphasizes the international perspective that gives the information in this string and the plurality of the audiences. With this tagline, CNN also refers to the various platforms to disseminate their content. The new image was created by the creativity and marketing department, and agency CNN Tooth & Nail. An important element of the rebrand was a new evening program that added the broadcast of programs Amanpour and World One. The makeover of CNN International has been subject to a lot of criticism on both the new prime-time lineup and the redesigned graphics.

On January 11, 2009, in a bid to compete directly with Al Jazeera English, the network launched a new production center: CNN Abu Dhabi, based in the United Arab Emirates. Then, CNN International adapted half-hour shows in its schedule with a new evening prime program for the Middle East viewers, Prism.

CNN International logo from 2009 to 2014

In 2010, CNN International launched new programs for its evening lineup to improve its schedule. In 2011, programs from CNN U.S. were added to the CNN International schedule, including the talk program Piers Morgan Live which was later canceled and replaced with CNN Tonight hosted by Don Lemon.

=== This is CNN (2013–present) ===
"This is CNN" represents CNN International's rebrand with new sets and output in full 16:9 high definition. The "This is CNN" slogan is also used on its sister network CNN in the United States. The managing director of CNN International from 2003 to May 2019 was Tony Maddox.

In 2019, CNN International announced it was reducing its programming and staff based in London to reduce costs, with CNNi losing $10 million per year. Later that year, CNNi cancelled its Asia-Pacific Primetime Show, News Stream, anchored by Kristie Lu Stout, effectively reducing production output from its Hong Kong studios and since 2020, with the exception of American overnight hours, live CNN International programming now only airs on weekdays, and for around 10 hours a day with the remaining hours filled with simulcasts of CNN US and, at the weekend, by simulcasts of CNN US, punctuated by pre-recorded magazine programs.

In 2022, WarnerMedia closed CNN International in Russia due to Russia's invasion of Ukraine.

On October 19, 2026, CNNi veteran Christiane Amanpour announced that she would be leaving the network for the second time and definitely, sometime in June 2027.

== Regional and online versions ==
There are five variants of CNN International:

- CNN International Asia Pacific, based in Hong Kong, China; Taipei, Taiwan and Manila, Philippines
- CNN International Europe/Middle East/Africa, based in London, United Kingdom
- CNN International in Latin America, based in Atlanta, Georgia, U.S.
- CNN International North America (Note: Canadian markets only), based in Atlanta, Georgia, U.S.
- CNN International South Asia, based in New Delhi, India

The schedules of the different regional versions no longer differ significantly from each other, but there are still minor variations such as content during the commercial breaks (e.g. weather forecasts and local airtimes shown).

CNN has reported that its broadcast agreement in mainland China includes an arrangement that its signal must pass through a Chinese-controlled satellite. With this method of transmission, Chinese authorities have been able to black out CNNi segments at will. CNN has also said that its broadcasts are not widely available in mainland China, but rather only in certain diplomatic compounds, hotels, and apartment blocks.

In June 2015, CNN International was made available online in the United States for CNN/U.S subscribers on participating television providers through the CNNgo service.

In 2023, much of CNN International's original programming was made available through CNN Max, its streaming channel in the United States through the HBO Max streaming service. This allowed viewers to tune in to the channel without a linear pay TV subscription. On October 28, 2025, CNN International became available part-time on CNN.com and the CNN App to those in the United States who subscribe directly to its CNN All Access tier (weekdays from 09:00 to 17:00 Eastern time). Earlier, on October 3, CNN announced that its namesake Max service would be discontinued on November 17, with no reason given.

=== CNNj ===
CNNj channel logo

CNNj is a Japanese version of CNN International distributed by Japan Cable Television that was first launched on March 1, 2003. CNNj is tailored specifically for a Japanese audience, with all programming broadcast from 7:00 a.m. to 12:00 a.m. (Japan Standard Time) being translated into Japanese. The channel used to broadcast a mixture of CNN International and CNN/US, but since 2008, CNNj has been a direct relay of CNN International Asia Pacific.

Starting late 2010, the high-definition feed of CNN US was launched in Japan for American viewers under the name "CNN/US HD", the first such feed available outside of the United States.

== Programming ==
=== News programs ===
Some of the programs produced by CNN/US are not broadcast on CNNi in full.

- Amanpour with Christiane Amanpour
- Anderson Cooper 360° with Anderson Cooper; produced by CNN/US
- CNN NewsNight with Abby Phillip; produced by CNN/US
- CNN Newsroom; produced by CNN/US
- CNN Newsroom (overnight)
- CNN News Central; produced by CNN/US
- CNN This Morning with Audie Cornish; produced by CNN/US
- CNN This Morning Weekend; produced by CNN/US
- Connect the World with Becky Anderson; live from Abu Dhabi (CNNi only)
- CNN Headline Express (2026–present); produced by CNN/US
- Erin Burnett OutFront; produced by CNN/US
- Fareed Zakaria GPS; produced by CNN/US
- First of All with Victor Blackwell; produced by CNN/US
- Inside Politics with Manu Raju; produced by CNN/US
- Isa Soares Tonight; live from London (CNNi only)
- Laura Coates Live; produced by CNN/US
- One World with Zain Asher; live from New York (CNNi only)
- Quest Means Business with Richard Quest; live from New York/London (CNNi only)
- Smerconish with Michael Smerconish; produced by CNN/US
- State of the Union; produced by CNN/US
- The Amanpour Hour; produced by CNN/US
- The Brief with Jim Sciutto; live from Washington (CNNi only)
- The Lead with Jake Tapper; produced by CNN/US
- The Source with Kaitlan Collins; produced by CNN/US
- The Story Is with Elex Michaelson; produced by CNN/US
- What We Know with Max Foster; produced in London
- World Sport

=== Magazine programs ===
- Africa Inc.
- African Voices
- African Voices: Playmakers or My Drive
- CNN Creators
- Connecting Africa; presented by Eleni Giokos
- Inside Africa
- Marketplace Africa; presented by Zain Asher
- Marketplace Asia; presented by Kristie Lu Stout, Hanako Montgomery, and Mike Valerio
- Marketplace Europe; presented by Anna Cooban, Anna Stewart, and Clare Sebastian
- Marketplace Middle East; presented by Giokos
- Quest's World of Wonder
- Tech for Good; presented by Stout
- The Link, Marketplace Africa spinoff presented by Asher

=== Former programming ===
- Alpine Edge with Christina MacFarlane
- American Edition; hosted by Jonathan Mann
- The Art of Movement
- BackStory
- Best of Quest
- The Brief with Bianca Nobilo
- The Circuit with Amanda Davies
- CNNGo
- CNN Business Traveller; presented by Richard Quest
- CNN Money; presented by Maggie Lake
- CNN Style
- CNN Today (2004–2009; 2014–2019)
- CNN Tonight; produced by CNN/US
- CNN Talk
- Cuomo Prime Time (2017–2021); produced by CNN/US
- The Daily Show Global Edition
- Diplomatic License (1994–2006); debates feature for the United Nations
- Early Start (2012–2024)
- Early Start with Rahel Solomon (2025–2026)
- Eco Solutions
- First Move with Julia Chatterley
- Hala Gorani Tonight
- In 24 Hours
- iReport for CNN
- Insight
- International Desk (2009–2019)
- Inventing Tomorrow: Tech in the Time of the Pandemic; presented by Kristie Lu Stout
- King Charles; produced by CNN/US
- Larry King Live (1985–2010), talk show; produced by CNN/US
- Late Edition (1993–2009); talk show; produced by CNN/US
- Living Golf; presented by Shane O'Donoghue
- Make Create Innovate; presented by Nick Glass
- MainSail (2004–2018); presented by Shirley Robertson
- NewsNight with Aaron Brown (2001–2005); talk show; produced by CNN/US
- News Stream (2010–2019); presented by Kristie Lu Stout
- On China; presented by Kristie Lu Stout
- One World with Zain Asher and Bianna Golodryga
- Piers Morgan Live (2011–2014); talk show; produced by CNN/US
- Political Mann
- The Screening Room
- Seasons with Hikari Mori (season 1) and Laura Jackson (season 2)
- State of America with Kate Bolduan, formerly State of the Race with Kate Bolduan
- State of the Race with Kasie Hunt
- Table for Five with Abby Phillip; produced by CNN/US
- Winning Post; presented by Aly Vance
- World Business Today
- World News (until 2009)
- World Report
- The World Right Now
- Your World Today

== High definition ==
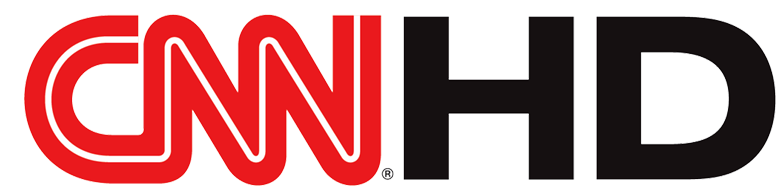

CNN International HD is the high-definition simulcast feed of the channel broadcasting at 1920x1080p, which was launched in September 2012. Before June 3, 2013, only programming from CNN/US was available natively in HD, while shows made for CNN International were produced in 4:3 576i. In February 2013, the European SD feed of CNN International began broadcasting in widescreen by downscaling the HD feed, which resulted in all 4:3-native programming being broadcast in pillarbox until the June 3 switchover, and finalized on June 17 of the same year, when the switchover was completed.

Following the March 2003 launch of CNNj, a live relay of CNN/US and CNN International, with simultaneous audio translation into Japanese, starting in late 2010, the high definition feed of CNN/US was launched in Japan under the name CNN HD. CNN/US (both SD and HD) is also available on Greater China-based satellite service DishHD, a subsidiary of Dish Network in the United States.

On June 28, 2016, CNN International HD was launched for Sky customers in the UK (including on Freesat from Sky), on channel 506 or 579, making the next news channel launch in the 600s. The HD version is available free-to-air within the British Isles, and is provided on satellite and IPTV services, and also live-streamed for U.K. users (and geo-blocked outside the U.K.), through CNN International's official U.K. video site. However, viewers with non-proprietary Freesat boxes will need to add the channel manually as Freesat does not market CNN International HD publicly as part of its offerings.

== Online ==
CNN debuted its news website CNN.com (initially an experiment known as CNN Interactive) on August 30, 1995. The site attracted growing interest over its first decade and is now one of the most popular news websites in the world. The widespread growth of blogs, social media and user-generated content have influenced the site, and blogs in particular have focused CNN's previously scattershot online offerings, most noticeably in the development and launch of CNN Pipeline in late 2005. In April 2009, CNN.com ranked third place among online global news sites in unique users in the U.S. according to Nielsen/NetRatings; with an increase of 11% over the previous year.

CNN Pipeline was the name of a paid subscription service, its corresponding website, and a content delivery client that provided streams of live video from up to four sources (or "pipes"), on-demand access to CNN stories and reports, and optional pop-up "news alerts" to computer users. The installable client was available to users of PCs running Microsoft Windows. There was also a browser-based "web client" that did not require installation. In July 2007, the service was discontinued and replaced with a free streaming service.

The now-defunct topical news program Judy Woodruff's Inside Politics was the first CNN program to feature a round-up of blogs in 2005. Blog coverage was expanded when Inside Politics was folded into The Situation Room. In 2006, CNN launched CNN Exchange and CNN iReport, initiatives designed to further introduce and centralize the impact of everything from blogging to citizen journalism within the CNN brand. CNN iReport which features user-submitted photos and video, has achieved considerable traction, with increasingly professional-looking reports filed by amateur journalists, many still in high school or college. The iReport gained more prominence when observers of the Virginia Tech shootings sent in first-hand photos of what was going on during the shootings.

In early 2008, CNN began maintaining a live-streaming broadcast available to those who receive CNN at home. CNN International is broadcast live, as part of the RealNetworks SuperPass subscription outside the U.S. CNN also offers several RSS feeds and podcasts.

On April 18, 2008, CNN.com was targeted by Chinese hackers in retaliation for the channel's coverage of the 2008 Tibetan unrest. CNN reported that they took preventive measures after news broke of the impending attack. The company was honored at the 2008 Technology & Engineering Emmy Awards for development and implementation of an integrated and portable IP-based live, edit and store-and-forward digital newsgathering system.

On October 24, 2009, CNN launched a new version of the CNN.com website, revamping it by adding a new "sign up" option where users may create their user name, a new "CNN Pulse" (beta) feature along a new red color theme. However, most of the news archived on the website has been deleted. CNN also has a channel on the popular video-sharing site YouTube, which as of October 2025 has 18.7 million subscribers.

In April 2010, CNN announced via Twitter its upcoming food blog called "Eatocracy", which will "cover all news related to food – from recalls to health issues to culture." CNN had an internet relay chat (IRC) network at chat.cnn.com. CNN placed a live chat with Benjamin Netanyahu on the network in 1998.

CNN also maintains a wire service known as CNN Wire, a CNN Newsource division.

== Bureaus ==
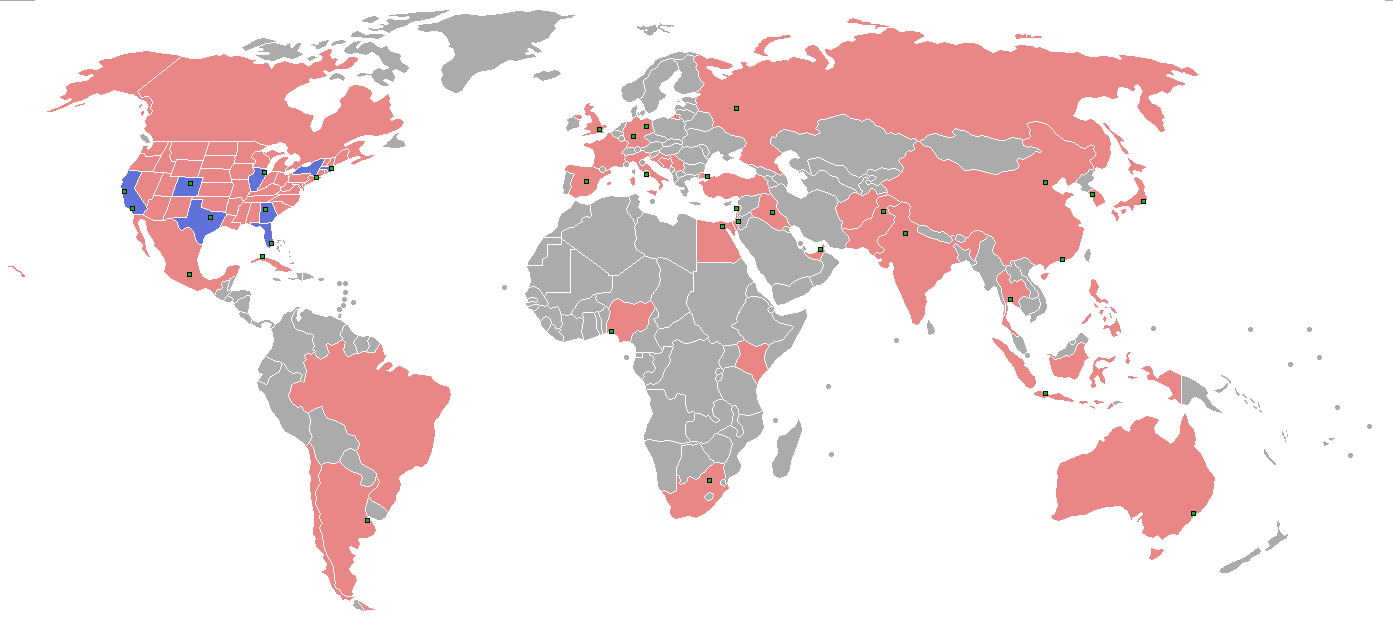
CNN bureau locations

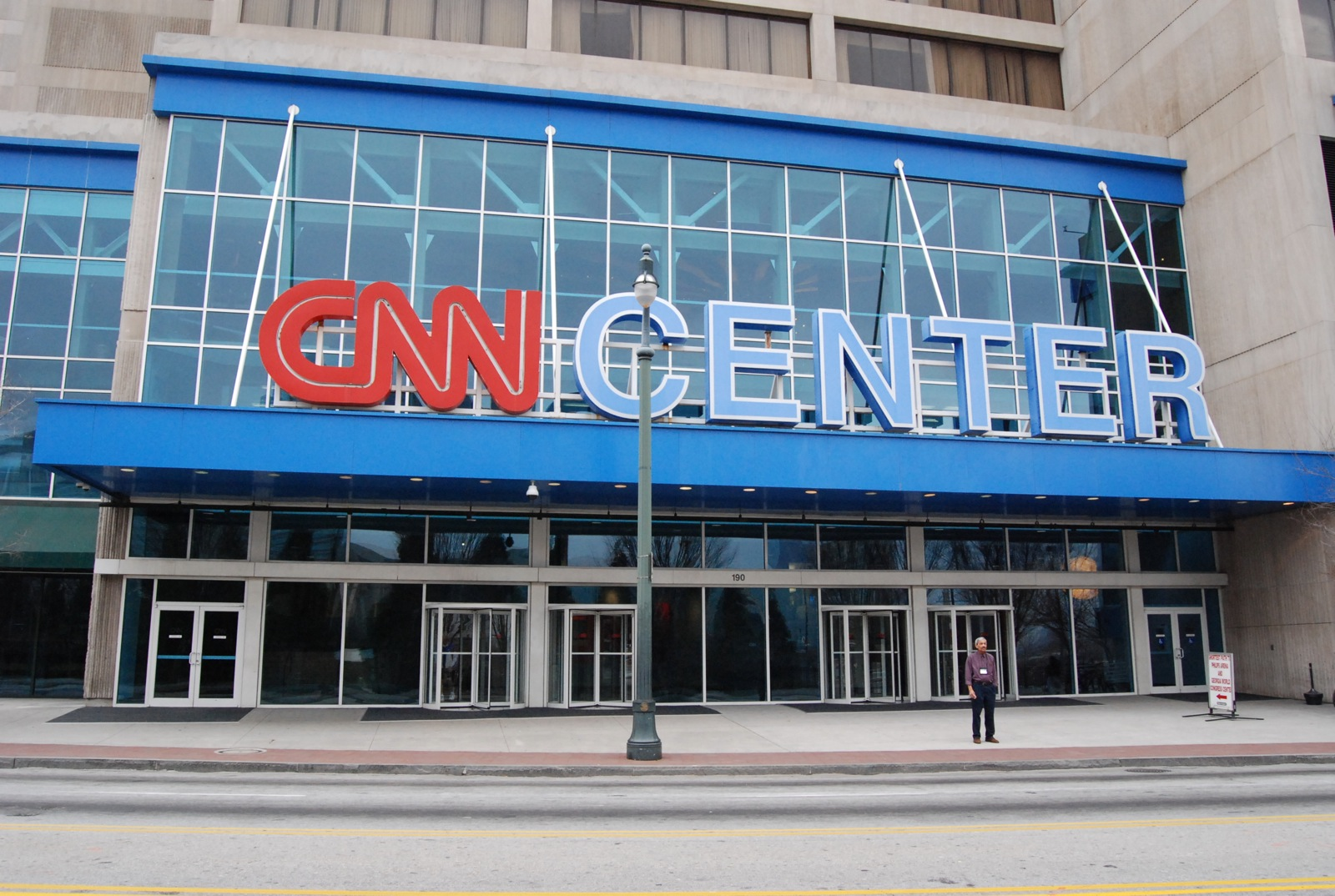
The CNN Center in Atlanta

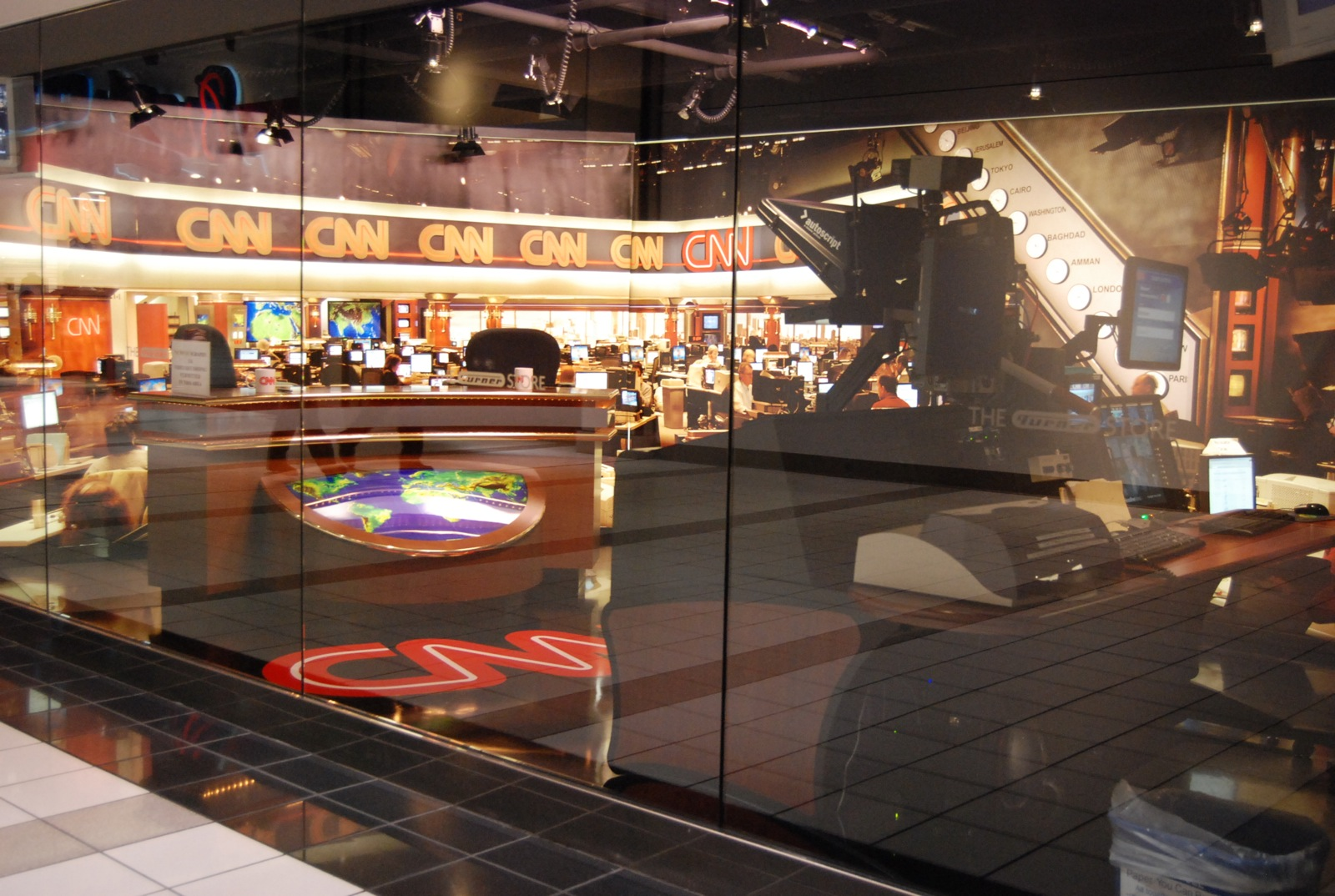
CNN Center studios

Note: Boldface indicates that they are CNN's original bureaus, meaning they have been in operation since CNN's founding.

=== United States ===
- **Atlanta** (**World Headquarters**)
- Albuquerque
- Boston
- **Burbank**
- Charlotte
- **Chicago**
- Cleveland
- Columbus
- Dallas
- Denver
- Houston
- Detroit
- Indianapolis
- Kansas City
- Las Vegas
- **Los Angeles**
- **Miami**
- Minneapolis
- Nashville
- New Orleans
- **New York City**
- Orlando
- Omaha
- Oklahoma City
- Philadelphia
- Portland
- Phoenix
- Raleigh-Durham
- Richmond
- **San Francisco**
- **Seattle**
- Salt Lake City
- St. Louis
- **Washington, D.C.**

=== Worldwide ===
- **Abu Dhabi, United Arab Emirates** (Middle East regional headquarters)
- Amman, Jordan
- Auckland, New Zealand
- Baghdad, Iraq
- Bangkok, Thailand
- Beijing, China
- Beirut, Lebanon
- Belgrade, Serbia; Sarajevo, Bosnia and Herzegovina; Zagreb, Croatia (**N1** Ex-Yugoslav regional headquarters)
- Berlin, Germany
- **Bucharest, Romania** (**Antena 3 CNN**)
- Buenos Aires, Argentina
- Cairo, Egypt
- Dubai, United Arab Emirates
- Frankfurt, Germany
- Havana, Cuba
- **Hong Kong** (Asia Pacific regional headquarters)
- Islamabad, Pakistan
- **Istanbul, Turkey** (**CNN Türk**)
- **Jakarta, Indonesia** (**CNN Indonesia**)
- Jerusalem
- **Johannesburg, South Africa** (African regional headquarters)
- Kabul, Afghanistan
- Kuala Lumpur, Malaysia
- Lagos, Nigeria
- **Lisbon, Portugal** (**CNN Portugal**)
- **London, United Kingdom** (European regional headquarters)
- Madrid, Spain
- Manila, Philippines
- **Mexico City, Mexico** (Latin American regional headquarters)
- Montreal, Quebec, Canada
- Moscow, Russia
- Mumbai, India
- Nairobi, Kenya
- **New Delhi, India** (South Asia, regional headquarters)
- Ottawa, Ontario, Canada
- Oslo, Norway
- **Paris, France**
- **Prague, Czech Republic** (**CNN Prima News**)
- Porto, Portugal (**CNN Portugal**)
- Rio de Janeiro, Brazil
- Rome, Italy
- **Santiago, Chile** (**CNN Chile**)
- **São Paulo, Brazil** (**CNN Brazil**)
- Seoul, South Korea
- Shanghai, China
- Singapore
- Stockholm, Sweden
- Sydney, Australia
- Taipei, Taiwan
- **Tirana, Albania** (**A2 CNN**)
- **Tokyo, Japan** (**CNNj**)
- Vancouver, British Columbia, Canada
- Toronto, Ontario, Canada

In parts of the world without a CNN bureau, reports from a local affiliate station are used to file a story.

== Present personalities ==
CNN U.S. weekdays anchors and hosts

- Audie Cornish – weekdays anchor of CNN This Morning, CNN U.S. anchor
- John Berman – weekdays anchor of CNN News Central, CNN U.S. anchor
- Kate Bolduan – weekdays anchor of CNN News Central, CNN U.S. anchor
- Sara Sidner – weekdays anchor of CNN News Central, CNN U.S. anchor
- Jake Tapper – weekdays anchor of The Lead, CNN U.S. anchor, chief Washington correspondent

CNN U.S. weeknights anchors and hosts

- Erin Burnett – weeknights anchor of Erin Burnett OutFront, CNN U.S. anchor
- Anderson Cooper – weeknights anchor of Anderson Cooper 360°, CNN U.S. anchor, correspondent
- Kaitlan Collins – weeknights anchor of The Sources with Kaitlan Collins, CNN U.S. anchor, White House correspondent
- Abby Phillip – weeknights anchor of CNN NewsNight, CNN U.S. anchor, senior political correspondent
- Laura Coates – weeknights anchor of Laura Coates Live, CNN U.S. anchor, chief legal analyst correspondent
- Elex Michaelson – weeknights anchor of The Story Is, CNN U.S. anchor and Los Angeles correspondent

CNN U.S. weekend anchors and hosts

- Victor Blackwell – weekend anchor of CNN This Morning Weekend and First of All, CNN U.S. anchor
- Michael Smerconish – weekend anchor of Smerconish, CNN U.S. anchor, political commentator
- Christiane Amanpour – weekend anchor of The Amanpour Hour, chief international anchor
- Manu Raju – weekend anchor of Inside Politics, CNN U.S. anchor, chief congressional correspondent
- Jake Tapper – weekend anchor of State of the Union, CNN U.S. anchor, chief Washington correspondent
- Dana Bash – weekend anchor of State of the Union, CNN U.S. anchor, chief political correspondent
- Fareed Zakaria – weekend anchor of Fareed Zakaria GPS, CNN U.S. anchor, correspondent

CNN International anchors and hosts

- Salma Abdelaziz – CNN Newsroom anchor, London correspondent
- Christiane Amanpour – anchor of Amanpour, chief international anchor
- Becky Anderson – anchor of Connect the World with Becky Anderson
- Zain Asher – anchor of One World with Zain Asher, presenter of Marketplace Africa and The Link
- Rosemary Church – anchor of CNN Newsroom
- Anna Cooban – co-presenter of Marketplace Europe, London correspondent
- Amanda Davies – anchor of World Sport
- Max Foster – anchor of What We Know with Max Foster, London correspondent
- Ben Hunte – anchor of CNN Newsroom
- Lynda Kinkade – anchor of CNN Newsroom
- Christina MacFarlane – anchor of CNN Newsroom and former presenter of Alpine Edge and World Sport
- Richard Quest – anchor of Quest Means Business, fill-in anchor
- Don Riddell – anchor of World Sport
- Andy Scholes – contributor to World Sport
- Polo Sandoval – anchor of CNN Newsroom
- Patrick Snell – anchor of World Sport
- Kristie Lu Stout – co-presenter of Tech for Good and Marketplace Asia, fill-in anchor
- Hanako Montgomery – co-presenter of Marketplace Asia, Tokyo correspondent
- Anna Stewart – co-presenter of Marketplace Europe, London correspondent
- Clare Sebastian – co-presenter of Marketplace Europe, London correspondent
- Isa Soares – anchor of Isa Soares Tonight, correspondent
- Coy Wire – contributor to World Sport

Meteorologists and correspondents

- Melissa Bell – Paris-based senior international correspondent
- Matthew Chance – Jerusalem correspondent
- Nima Elbagir – senior international correspondent
- Nada Bashir – London correspondent
- Paula Hancocks – Abu Dhabi correspondent
- Eleni Giokos – Dubai correspondent, host of Connecting Africa
- Paula Newton – Ottawa (Canada) correspondent and fill-in anchor
- Frederik Pleitgen – Berlin correspondent and fill-in anchor
- Nic Robertson – international diplomatic editor
- Nick Paton Walsh – senior international correspondent
- Clarissa Ward – chief international correspondent
- Isobel Yeung – international correspondent

== Past personalities ==
- Jim Acosta
- Natalie Allen (now with Scripps News, formerly Newsy)
- Guillermo Arduino (now with CNN en Español and CNN Latino)
- Julio Aliaga (joined CCTV America, now CGTN America)
- Terry Baddoo
- Errol Barnett (now with CBS News)
- Ralph Begleiter
- Satinder Bindra
- Jim Bittermann – Paris-based senior international correspondent
- Anthony Bourdain (died in 2018)
- Aaron Brown
- Andrew Brown
- Kim Brunhuber – anchor of CNN Newsroom
- Samuel Burke – anchor of iReport, technology correspondent
- Julia Chatterley – Anchor of First Move with Julia Chatterley
- Joie Chen (joined Al Jazeera America)
- Patricia Chew
- Jim Clancy
- Stephen Cole (joined Al Jazeera English)
- Anna Coren (now with CBS News)
- Chris Cuomo (fired in 2021)
- Robyn Curnow
- Arwa Damon
- Jason Dasey
- John Defterios – anchor of Marketplace Middle East
- Eboni Deon (now with WISH-TV)
- Daljit Dhaliwal
- Jill Dougherty (now a CNN analyst)
- Anna Edwards
- Adrian Finighan (left CNN in 2009 to set up own company; joined Al Jazeera English)
- Sara Ganim – Atlanta correspondent
- Kate Giles (joined Fox Sports)
- Bianna Golodryga – senior global affairs analyst
- Hala Gorani (now with NBC News)
- Stan Grant
- Poppy Harlow – anchor of CNN This Morning, CNN U.S. anchor
- Leon Hawthorne
- Michael Holmes – anchor of CNN Newsroom (retired in 2024)
- George Howell
- Laura Jarrett – weekday anchor of Early Start (joined NBC News)
- Pedram Javaheri – meteorologist
- Rhiannon Jones – presenter of Judo World, fill-in anchor of World Sport
- Jerrold Kessel, Jerusalem correspondent, 1990–2003
- Riz Khan (left CNN in 2005 to join Al Jazeera English)
- Larry King (†; retired in 2010)
- Jeff Koinange (left CNN in 2007 following personal accusations made against him by an alleged former love interest)
- Alison Kosik – New York Stock Exchange correspondent (now with ABC News)
- May Lee (later host of STAR World's The May Lee Show)
- Don Lemon – anchor of CNN This Morning, CNN U.S. anchor, correspondent (fired in 2023; currently an independent journalist)
- Amber Lyon
- Sheila MacVicar (joined Al Jazeera America)
- Rima Maktabi
- Jonathan Mann
- Lola Martinez
- Colleen McEdwards
- Saima Mohsin – Bangkok-based international correspondent
- Piers Morgan
- Anand Naidoo (joined CCTV America, now CGTN America)
- Asieh Namdar (joined CCTV America, now CGTN America)
- Bianca Nobilo – London correspondent, CNN Newsroom co-anchor
- Robin Oakley
- Femi Oke (joined Al Jazeera English)
- Veronica Pedrosa (joined Al Jazeera English)
- Juanita Phillips
- Pedro Pinto
- Ash-har Quraishi
- Monita Rajpal
- Aneesh Raman
- Mari Ramos
- Anjali Rao
- Afshin Rattansi (later with RT, formerly Russia Today)
- Candy Reid
- Maria Ressa (left CNN to become head of ABS-CBN News and Current Affairs division; currently Rappler CEO)
- Kate Riley – anchor of World Sport
- Hugh Riminton (now with Ten News)
- Dan Rivers (returned to ITV News)
- Shirley Robertson – presenter of MainSail
- Christine Romans – weekdays anchor of Early Start (joined NBC News)
- Richard Roth – senior United Nations correspondent
- Sonia Ruseler
- Brent Sadler
- Bill Schneider
- Bernard Shaw (†; retired in 2001)
- Nicki Shields – presenter of Supercharged
- Isha Sesay
- Linden Soles
- Rahel Solomon – weekday anchor of Early Start, CNN U.S. anchor
- Martin Soong (returned to CNBC in 2005)
- Barbara Starr
- Andrew Stevens
- Stephanie Sy (joined PBS NewsHour Weekend)
- Alex Thomas (joined Al Jazeera English)
- Fionnuala Sweeney
- Aly Vance – presenter of Winning Post
- Cyril Vanier (joined Al Jazeera English)
- Ralitsa Vassileva
- John Vause – anchor of CNN Newsroom, correspondent
- Ali Velshi
- Zain Verjee
- Alessio Vinci
- Amara Walker – weekend anchor of CNN This Morning Weekend
- Selina Wang – Tokyo-based correspondent (joined ABC News)
- Hines Ward – contributor to World Sport
- Harris Whitbeck
- John Zarrella

== Criticism ==
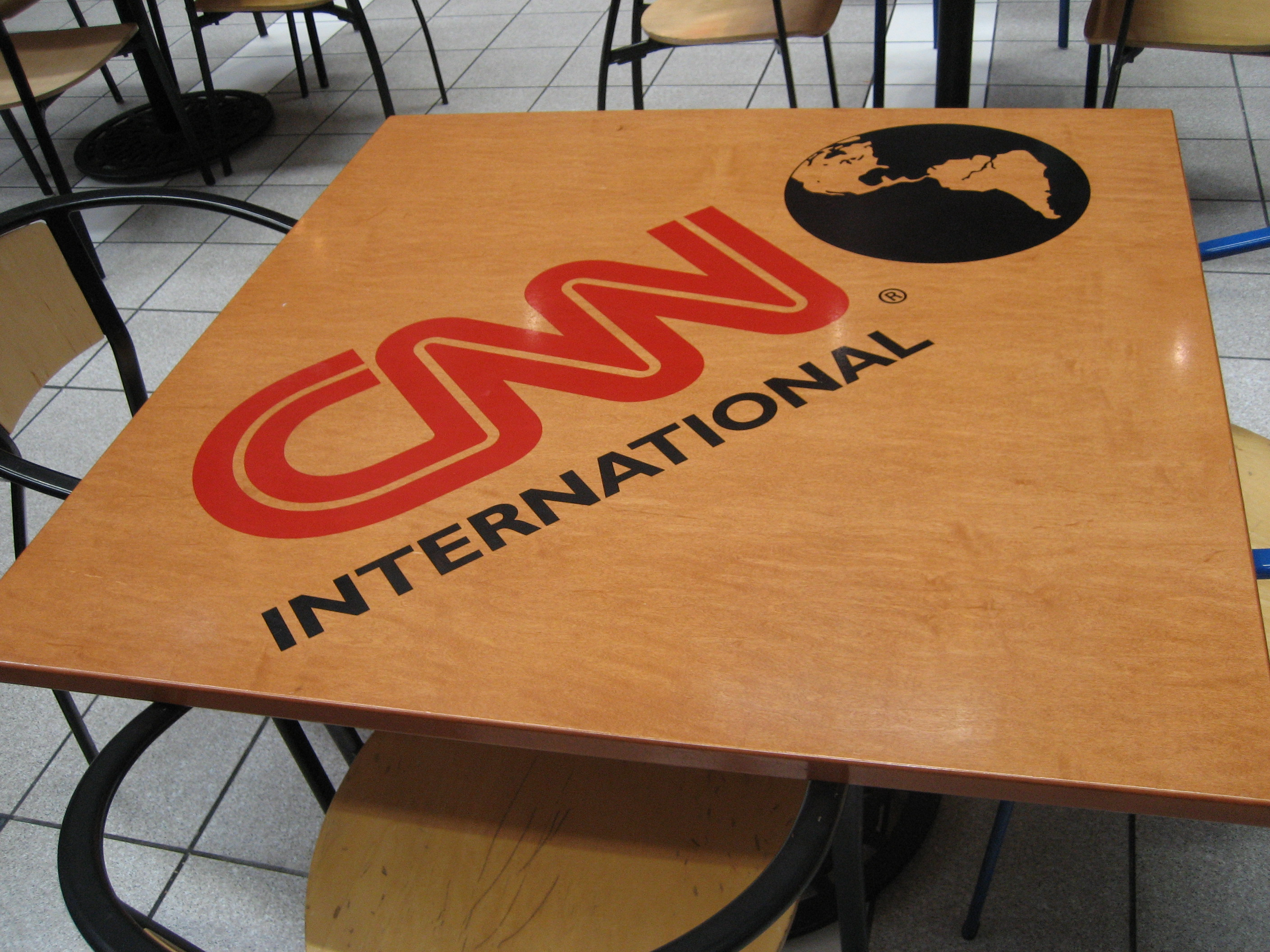
The CNN International logo on a table viewed inside the CNN Center in Atlanta. These tables have since been removed.

=== Middle Eastern reporting ===
In October 2011, Amber Lyon gave her claims to the Syrian government news agency SANA that she had been directed by CNN to report selectively, repetitively, and falsely to sway public opinion in favor of direct American aggression against Iran and Syria, and that this was common practice under CNN. She subsequently repeated this claim, addressing the degraded state of journalistic ethics in an interview during which she also discussed the Bahraini episode, suggesting paid-for content was also taken from Georgia, Kazakhstan, and other states, that the war on terrorism had also been employed as a pretext to pre-empt substantive investigative journalism within the U.S., and that following the Bahrain reporting, her investigative department had been terminated and "reorganized", and her severance and employee benefits used as a threat to intimidate and attempt to purchase her subsequent silence.

Lyon claimed to have met with Tony Maddox, president of CNN International, twice about this issue in 2011 and had claimed that during the second meeting, she was threatened and intimated to stop speaking on the matter. CNN issued a detailed response to Lyon's claims about its coverage of Bahrain.

On July 7, 2010, Octavia Nasr, senior Middle East editor and a CNN journalist for 20 years, was fired after she expressed admiration on her Twitter account for a militant Muslim cleric and former Hezbollah leader who had recently died.

== See also ==
- International broadcasting
- List of news channels
