= CNN This Morning =

CNN This Morning may refer to the following programs broadcast by CNN:

- CNN This Morning, a forerunner to CNN Today that was broadcast on CNN International in Asia Pacific region and Europe.
- CNN This Morning (2022), the former morning news program on CNN/US from 2022-2024.
- CNN This Morning with Audie Cornish, the current early morning program on CNN previously branded as Early Start.
- CNN This Morning Weekend, the current title for CNN's morning weekend programming, previously New Day Weekend.
