= David Davies (football administrator) =

British broadcaster and consultant

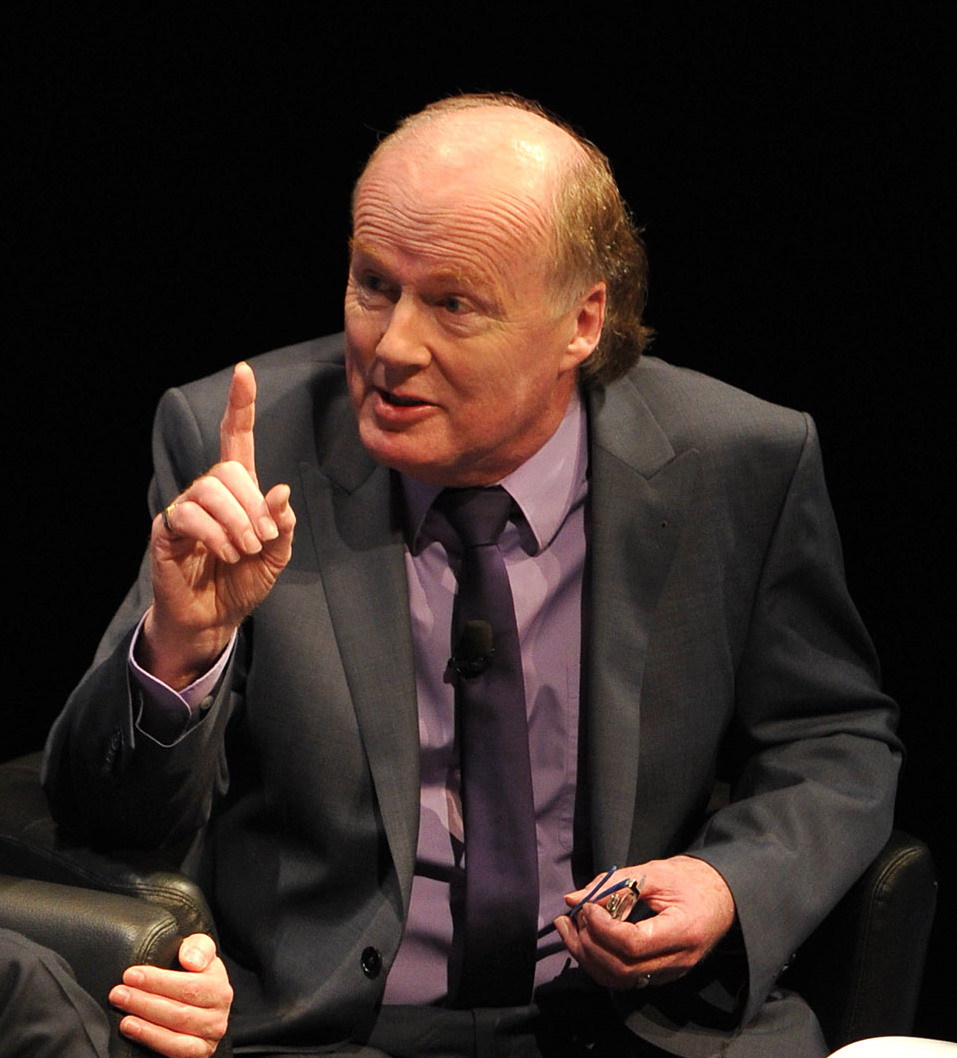
David Davies during a debate at the Nations & Regions Media Conference in 2012

David Davies OBE (born 1948) is a British broadcaster and consultant, who was the executive director of the Football Association in England. He was a frequent contributor to BBC television and radio programmes. Since retiring from the FA, he has worked as a consultant to sporting and other organisations.

== BBC, 1971–1994 ==
Davies worked on shows including Nationwide, Newsnight, Songs of Praise and Children in Need.

From 1983, he presented the BBC News and the Today programme on Radio 4. He was a political correspondent, 1983–1986, and education correspondent, 1986–1989.

From 1989 to 1994, he presented BBC Midlands Today and served as a correspondent and occasional presenter of the BBC's biggest sports programmes, Match of the Day and Grandstand. It was during this period one Saturday night that he is said to have coined the phrase on the Saturday night news preceding Match of the Day "If you don't want to know the score, look away now."

== Football Association, 1994–2006 ==
Davies served in a variety of senior roles at the FA in England until his retirement in 2006. They included director of communications and public affairs, head of football affairs, director of international strategy and executive director. He worked extensively in the preparation of the European Football Championships in England in 1996.

Internationally, he served for eight years on the IFAB, which agrees any changes to the laws of football around the world, and was one of the earliest advocates of goalline technology.

During some turbulent years at the FA, he was described as "arguably the most powerful administrator in the English game" in 1999 when he was acting chief executive and director of public affairs. He became widely known as the FA's "chief spin doctor" for his crisis management of England team managers. He worked especially closely with managers Terry Venables, Glenn Hoddle, Kevin Keegan and Sven-Göran Eriksson. In 2008, two years after leaving the FA, his book FA Confidential was published. He also co-authored Glenn Hoddle's World Cup Diary in 1998.

== Other work ==
Davies was a member of the UK Government Football Task Force from 1997 to 2000 and was part of the UK Government Business, Culture and Sport delegation to China in 2005. He also chaired the UK Government Free To Air/Listed Events panel in 2008 and 2009. He worked with the British Olympic Association from 1999 to 2006, during which time London bid successfully to stage the 2012 Olympic and Paralympic Games. He served as a partner in the Iraq United sport development programme from 2004 to 2006 and was a senior advisor to the CEO of the 2010 FIFA World Cup in South Africa. He was a senior consultant for change agents Scott Wilson Group, which was appointed in September 2010 by the Hong Kong FA to lead the reform and restructuring of football on the island. His portfolio of consultancies has included roles with Coutts in London and Wiggin LLP. Over several years he chaired sporting and other conferences, including for ABTA and Soccerex.

== Charity work ==
Davies helped to stage a Game of Peace in the Olympic Stadium in Kabul, Afghanistan in 2003. Between 2013 and 2016, he was a board member of International Inspiration, a charity which promotes access to sport, play, and physical exercise for low and middle income families with children around the world. He was a founding member of football's anti-racism Kick It Out campaign in England, and part of the initial sports steering group for the NSPCC. In 2014, he became a trustee for CAFE, which works across Europe for disability awareness, and is a Vice President of Level Playing Field which campaigns for accessibility to sport and sports stadia for disabled people in England and Wales.

== Personal life ==
Davies is a qualified teacher and holds a certificate of education from the University of Oxford and a BA (Econ) in politics from the University of Sheffield.

He lives in the West Midlands of England near Birmingham with his wife Susan, and has two daughters, Amanda and Caroline, and one granddaughter, Molly. Amanda Davies is a sports correspondent and presenter for CNN International.

Davies was awarded an OBE for services to sport in the 2007 New Year Honours. He is also a Royal Television Society Member and Lancashire County Cricket Club. Since 2012, he has been a Council Member at the University of Birmingham, and most recently a governor of the University of Birmingham School.
