= Business International (TV programme) =

Former global news program on CNN International

- Genre: News Program
- Presented by: Becky Anderson, Adrian Finighan

Production
- Production locations: Great Marlborough Street, London
- Camera setup: Multiple-camera setup
- Running time: 60 minutes

Original release
- Network: CNN International
- Release: January 2001 – January 2009

Business International is a news television programme which aired on CNN International. It was anchored alternately by Adrian Finighan and Becky Anderson from CNN's London studios.

Business International was launched in 2001, initially as a twice-daily show co-presented by Becky Anderson and Richard Quest. As the title implies, it covered international business news. During the programme, market reports would come from the London Stock Exchange. However, in later years, the programme devoted more air time to breaking world news.

Between 2002 and 2004, the edition broadcast at 08:00 UK time was branded as Business Central and was presented by Richard Quest. This programme focused on financial news from Europe and Asia, and covered the opening of European financial markets.

The European evening edition of the programme, presented by Anderson, also had sports updates and a preview of the following day's newspaper headlines.

== Presenters ==
Years	Presenter
2001-2009	Becky Anderson
2001-2005	Richard Quest
2005-2006	Max Foster
2006-2009	Adrian Finighan

== Show-times ==
Business International aired up to three live one hour editions on weekdays. The show aired at 08:00, 11:00 and 22:00 UK time on weekdays.

== Cancellation ==
Business International was cancelled in 2009 and replaced by World Business Today and Quest Means Business.
