= CNN World Sport =

American television program

- Presented by: Don Riddell; Amanda Davies; Patrick Snell; Kate Riley; Coy Wire; Christina Macfarlane; Rhiannon Jones; Andy Scholes

Production
- Production locations: CNN Center, Atlanta; CNN London
- Running time: 30 minutes

Original release
- Network: CNN International
- Release: October 13, 1993

World Sport is a weekday news-magazine television series on CNN International that delivers a roundup of global sports news. The program is broadcast from the network's world headquarters at CNN Center in Atlanta, Georgia, and from the bureau in London.

The series launched in October 1993 and is the oldest continually broadcast program across the network. It is primarily anchored by Don Riddell. The other hosts include Amanda Davies, Patrick Snell, Kate Riley, Coy Wire, Christina Macfarlane, Andy Scholes and Rhiannon Jones. World Sport was relaunched with an updated graphics package and lower third alongside CNN's other programmes in February 2015.
