= Richard Quest =

British journalist and non-practising barrister

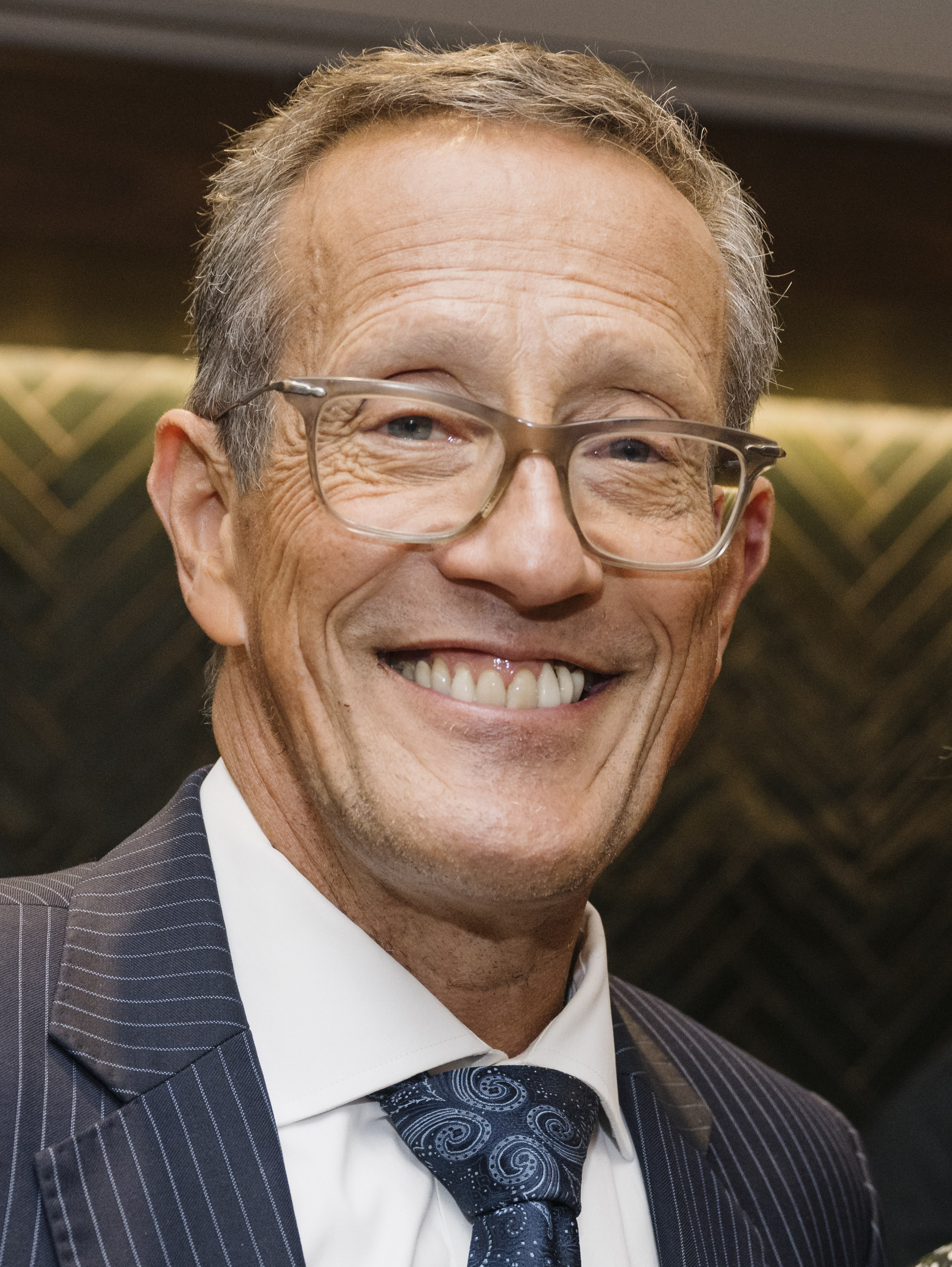
- Quest in 2024
- Born: Richard Austin Quest; 9 March 1962 (age 64); Liverpool, England
- Education: University of Leeds (LLB)
- Occupations: Barrister (non-practising); Journalist
- Notable credit(s): Business International; Quest Means Business; 500 Questions

Richard Austin Quest (born 9 March 1962) is a British journalist and non-practising barrister working as a news anchor for CNN International. He is also an editor-at-large of CNN Business.

He anchors Quest Means Business, the five-times-weekly business programme and fronts the CNN shows Business Traveller, The Express and Quest's World of Wonder.

== Early life and education ==
Quest is a native of Liverpool in Lancashire (now Merseyside), England, having been born and partly brought up there. He is of Sephardic Jewish descent.

He was educated at the state comprehensive Roundhay School in Leeds, followed by Airedale and Wharfedale College and the University of Leeds, where he earned a Bachelor of Laws in 1983, and was called to the Bar. He spent the 1983–1984 academic year in the United States at Vanderbilt University in Nashville, Tennessee, where he was the news director of WRVU.

== Career ==
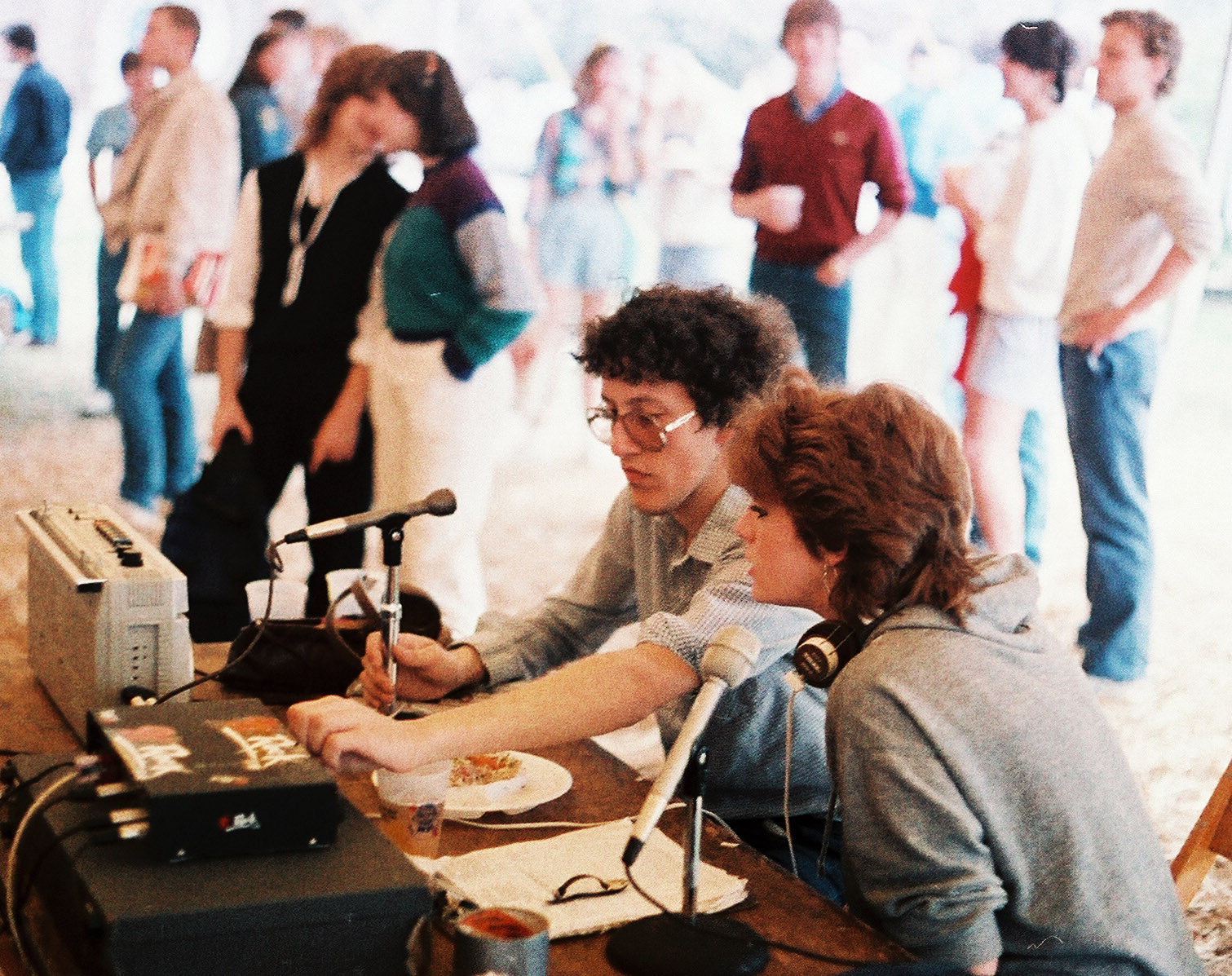
Quest and Lisa Neideffer of WRVU-FM broadcasting at Vanderbilt University, 1984

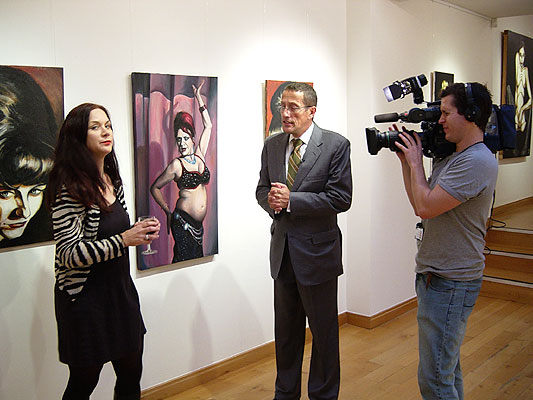
Quest interviews Stuckist artist Ella Guru at Spectrum London gallery, 2006

Quest became a trainee journalist at the BBC in 1985, joining its financial section in 1987, and moving to New York City in 1989 to become the BBC's North American business correspondent.

Quest later worked for the BBC from the United States as part of its then-fledgling BBC News 24 channel. He was the business correspondent reporting on, and discussing the world stock market in a regular segment entitled World Business Report usually aired between 2:00 am and 3:00 am (GMT), a programme that he presented alongside Paddy O'Connell. He was also an occasional presenter on the BBC's early-morning Business Breakfast programme.

Quest joined CNN in 2001, initially as co-presenter of newly-launched programme Business International. A year later, he moved to the European breakfast show BizNews, which he presented until 2005. Since this time Quest has covered a variety of different events for CNN, among others an analysis of the US elections as American Quest and the start of the circulation of Euro banknotes and coins on 1 January 2002 and the last official commercial flight of Concorde. He has also headed up CNN's coverage of several events involving the British royal family.

In 2006, Quest turned down an opportunity to join Al Jazeera English news channel, the English language version of al-Jazeera, "on the grounds that being gay and Jewish might not be suitable".

On 9 April 2015, Quest was announced as the host of the ABC game show 500 Questions. He was replaced by Dan Harris for the show's second season.

On 8 June 2015, Quest appeared as a contestant on The CNN Quiz Show: The Seventies Edition special produced by Eimear Crombie, along with his partner Brooke Baldwin playing for StandUp for Kids.

Quest is also an Aviation Correspondent for CNN, and extensively covered the story of Malaysia Airlines Flight 370, which disappeared on 8 March 2014. Quest later wrote the book, The Vanishing of Flight MH370: The True Story of the Hunt for the Missing Malaysian Plane, published by Penguin Random House on 8 March 2016.

== Personal life ==
In 2008, Quest was arrested in New York City's Central Park. Quest admitted being in possession of crystal methamphetamine, a controlled substance.

On 26 June 2014, Quest described his past experience as a closeted gay man on his CNN television programme Quest Means Business.

== See also ==
- Broadcast journalism
- LGBT culture in New York City
- List of LGBT people from New York City
- New Yorkers in journalism
