= Business International =

Business International may refer to:

- Business International (TV programme), CNN International's 2000–2009 global business news television programme
- Business International Corporation, a research, publishing and advisory company that was later merged with the Economist Intelligence Unit
