= CNN This Morning Weekend =

2022 American TV series or program

- Title card (2025-present)
- Also known as: New Day Weekend
- Genre: News; Talk
- Presented by: Weekends; Victor Blackwell
- Country of origin: United States
- Original language: English

Production
- Production locations: Turner Techwood; Atlanta
- Camera setup: Multi-camera
- Running time: 120 minutes

Original release
- Network: CNN; CNN International; HLN
- Release: June 22, 2013 – present

CNN This Morning Weekend is an American morning show airing on weekends on CNN and CNN International from CNN's headquarters at Techwood Studios in Atlanta.

The program originally launched on June 22, 2013, as New Day Weekend, the weekend edition of CNN's then-new morning show New Day. Following the launch in late 2022 of CNN This Morning on weekdays, the show was rebranded as CNN This Morning Weekend but did not see a format change. After the weekday program's eventual cancellation, This Morning Weekend continued as before.

== Background ==
=== New Day Weekend era (2013-2022) ===
New Day Weekend launched alongside its weekday morning counterpart in 2013. The program was initially co-anchored by Victor Blackwell and Christi Paul, and based out of CNN's then-headquarters at the CNN Center in Atlanta. Unlike New Day, the weekend show has maintained a two-anchor format throughout its entire existence.

In early 2021, Victor Blackwell left the program to co-anchor a two-hour block of CNN Newsroom with former New Day anchor Alisyn Camerota. He was replaced with Boris Sanchez, who would anchor from either Atlanta or Washington, D.C.

Paul announced her exit from the program in June 2022, citing the need to spend more time with her family, especially in the aftermath of the COVID-19 pandemic. Amara Walker replaced Paul, continuing to anchor from Atlanta.

=== CNN This Morning era (2022-present) ===
In November 2022, coinciding with the premiere of CNN's new weekday morning show CNN This Morning, New Day Weekend also switched to the CNN This Morning branding. The change did not impact the program's format, with Walker and Sanchez continuing to serve as anchors.

Sanchez exited the program in 2023 to anchor the new weekday show CNN News Central alongside former weekday New Day anchor Brianna Keilar and CNN Chief National Security Analyst Jim Sciutto. In the same shakeup, Blackwell returned to Atlanta to anchor the program along with the new Saturday morning program First of All.

Despite the cancellation of the weekday CNN This Morning in February 2024, the weekend show was not affected.

Walker announced in February 2025 that she would leave the network after more than ten years. An immediate successor was not named.

== Notable on-air staff ==
- Boris Sanchez, anchor (2021–2022; now on CNN News Central)
- Amara Walker, anchor (2022–2025)
- Victor Blackwell, anchor (2013–2021; 2023–present)
- Christi Paul, anchor (2013–2022)
- Danny Freeman, substitute anchor
