= CNN International Europe/Middle East/Africa =

- CNN International Europe logo
- Country: United Kingdom
- Broadcast area: Europe, Africa, and Middle East (except Iran, Sudan, and Syria)
- Network: CNN International; CNN
- Headquarters: London, United Kingdom

Programming
- Language: English
- Picture format: 1080p HDTV (downscaled to 16:9 576i for the SDTV feed.)

Ownership
- Owner: CNN Worldwide (Skydance Corporation)
- Sister channels: CNN; CNN-News18; CNN Indonesia; CNN en Español; HLN

History
- Launched: 1 September 1985; 41 years ago

Links
- Website: CNN.com

Availability

Terrestrial
- (Andorra) DTT: Channel 36
- (Sweden) Boxer TV Access: Channel 26
- (Netherlands) Digitenne: Channel 30 (HD)
- GOtv (Sub-Saharan Africa): Channel 72
- DStv (Sub-Saharan Africa): Channel 401
- Azam TV (East Africa): Channel 239

CNN International Europe/Middle East/Africa is the European, Middle East and African version of CNN's "CNN International" satellite and cable television network. It features many locally produced shows.

Between 1996 and 2003, to differentiate it from the other feeds, the network logo on the lower-right hand of the screen had a static globe with the continents Europe, the Middle East and Africa facing the audiences.

== Programming ==
In the earlier days of CNN International, the program line-up was exactly the same in every region CNN International was broadcast in. However, in the late-1990s, the line-up started varying among regions with some programs exclusively broadcasting to the Europe, Middle East and Africa only such as CNN This Morning (European edition) and World Business This Morning. Programming variations also included showtimes of selected magazine programmes during the weekend to allow audiences to watch them at a similar time slot to their counterparts elsewhere.

At present, the line-up is almost exactly the same in every region once again with differences limited to advertising and weather updates during the breaks.

== Broadcasting ==
Although this version of CNN International is intended primarily for European, African, and Middle Eastern viewers, a live feed of it is made available on selected aircraft of participating airlines like Emirates and Cathay Pacific regardless of their current position (subject to legal restrictions of the country these aircraft are flying over at the moment).

On 1 September 2021, CNN International was removed from the Virgin Media cable platform in the UK, and from the Freesat platform. It continued to be available on Sky UK's satellite service.

On 16 November 2021, CNN International was removed from Virgin Media Ireland.

== Switchover to high definition and 16:9 ==
CNN International HD is the high definition simulcast feed of the channel broadcasting at 1920x1080p, which was launched in September 2012. Prior to 2 June 2013, only programming from CNN/U.S. was available natively in HD, while shows made for CNN International were produced in 4:3 576i. In February 2013, the European SD feed of CNN International began broadcasting in widescreen by downscaling the HD feed, which resulted in all 4:3-native programming being broadcast in pillarbox until the 3 June switchover, finalising on 17 June of the same year, when the switchover was completed.

On 28 June 2016, CNN International HD was launched for Sky customers in the UK (including on Freesat from Sky), on channel 506 or 579, making the next news channel launch in the 600s, as it is next to the GOD Channel. The HD version is available free-to-air within the British Isles, and is provided on satellite and IPTV services, and also live-streamed for U.K. users (and geo-blocked outside the U.K.), through CNN International's official U.K. video site. However, viewers with non-proprietary Freesat boxes will need to add the channel manually as Freesat does not market CNN International HD publicly as part of its offerings.
