= Adam Neate =

British painter

Adam Neate. Suicide Bomber, 2007

Adam Neate (born 1977) is a British painter, conceptual artist and described by The Telegraph in 2008 as "one of the world's best-known street artists". He specialised in painting urban art on recycled cardboard, and has left thousands of works in the street for anyone to collect. He is a contributor from the movement in transferring street art into galleries. Neate's street art has garnered global interest, having been documented on CNN reports and European television. Major collectors and celebrities are fighting for his original works and international critics have lauded the artist's work. Since 2011 Neate has been mastering his own language of 'Dimensional Painting'. Elms Lesters publish a range of Adam Neate's Dimensional Editions and Multiples

== Early years ==
Adam Neate was born in Colchester, Essex and grew up in Ipswich, Suffolk. In the mid-1980s, aged nine or ten, he became familiar with graffiti art through a cousin, who was interested in it. Neate watched VHS videos about graffiti, as well as groups such as the Beastie Boys and hip-hop music. Then he borrowed books like Spray Can Art and Subway Art from the library: he was attracted by the colourful quality of the artwork, which he wanted to emulate.

He did not study painting, but graduated in design at Suffolk College, then moved to London and took a job as a graphic designer at Glue London, a digital advertising agency.

== Technique ==
He also took up painting, which he had long wanted to do. Using aerosols and found objects, he painted on cardboard boxes, which he collected from the street, avoiding the use of canvas because of its cost. His work can have two and three-dimensional qualities, as he tears the material, builds it in layers and staples pieces together, mainly making figurative images, which include self-portraits and portraits of friends.

In an essay in December 2012, art historian Ben Jones wrote "In Adam Neate’s most recent work, space itself becomes the medium. The accumulated plasticity of Cubism’s two distinct phases has been re-energised by Neate’s own distinctive mode: Dimensional Materialism. To get the full multi-dimensional effect, the viewer is asked to activate their own viewing space ...as you move and change vantage point, negative space is held in balance, unleashed, then restrained again. The image resolves itself. Foreground to background shifting, space dissolving, volume folds in, energy pushes out ...Neate’s compositions are mapped by sensations of simultaneity. Multiple moments of past experience are elided with a slowed down and extended present moment."

== Street Work ==
He gave away works to friends, but built up an excess and left them wrapped in bin liners outside charity shops as a donation. When he discovered that they were not being sold, but thrown out with the rubbish, he started to leave them in the streets instead, with works leaning on lampposts, doors and wheelie bins, as an open exhibition, which looked "really surreal". He could produce around 20 paintings a night, and around 1,000 a year. Over a five-year period, he left thousands of his works in London streets.

He had kept away from galleries, but was contacted by Elms Lesters, who wanted to show his work. Neate took up the invitation, but decided to do different work from his street art and develop other techniques and styles. In March 2007, journalist Max Foster picked up on Neate's work and was the first to report on him. In August 2007, at Elms Lesters Painting Rooms in London, he had a solo show, which sold out within hours of opening. He was described as a pioneer of the new movement which shows street art in conventional art galleries.

Following this he was able to give up his job. In December 2007, his painting Suicide Bomber sold for £78,500 at Sotheby's.

One of the 1,000 prints by Adam Neate left in the streets of London on 14 November 2008.

On 14 November 2008, in an event The London Show, he and helpers left 1,000 prints, worth a total of £1 million, around London streets for anyone to pick up and keep. When night came, the first teams started in the outer southern boroughs, Bromley, Bexley and Merton, and worked their way to the centre, covering all 32 boroughs and the City of London, and finishing in the early hours. Work was left in doorways and against shop windows.

Some of the work quickly appeared on eBay with starting prices ranging from 99p to £1,000; Neate had no objection to such sales, and thought it might help some people out for Christmas. He said, "It has always been a dream of mine to do a show around the whole of London, to take over the whole city in one go. I want everybody to be able to see it, but once the pieces are out there I don't mind what happens to them."

The works were screen prints on cardboard of a man, with stamping, each being slightly different, and protected in a cellophane wrapper; Andy Warhol provided the precedent for industrial style production. Neate created the master image in a stencil, and thereafter did not touch the prints, which were made by a professional screen printer. They were rubber-stamped with his signature. Neate wished to overcome boundaries between product, print and painting: "I’m interested in that Warhol idea of the brands as assisted readymade." He said, "The whole concept of the free art thing was challenging the notion of art as a commodity and its worth in society. Now I’m taking that to another level, testing the viability of separating art from commerce." His work is technically expert and has won him acknowledgement from the Tate, National Portrait Gallery and The National Gallery and various sell out shows at The Elms Lester Gallery. He is continually challenging his work, often quoting Picasso “To copy oneself is more dangerous than to copy others. It leads to sterility"

His work has gained recognition from the National Gallery, the Tate, and the National Portrait Gallery. He has expressed an interest in exploring sculpture and photography, as well as in travel to America and Venice.

Adam Neate is represented internationally by http://elmslesters.co.uk/

== Influences ==
Neate cites his influences as his wife, Waleska, New York graffiti artist, Daze, and Picasso.

== Notable exhibitions ==
- 'A New Understanding' (2009) - Neate explored how to portray a fourth dimension.
- 'The Flock Series', Elms Lesters, London (2010) - five key works were displayed
- 'Dimensional Paintings' (2011)
- 'Dimensional Editions and Paintings' (2012)
