= Julia Chatterley =

British journalist

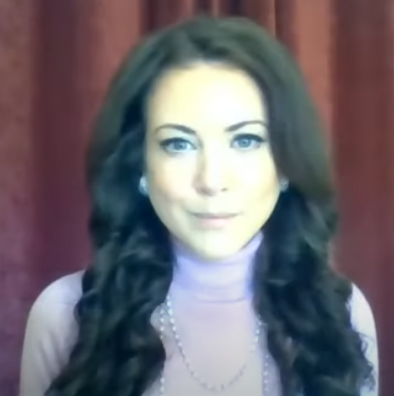
- At the 2022 World Economic Forum
- Education: London School of Economics
- Occupation: Journalist
- Employers: CNN; Bloomberg; PBS; Morgan Stanley

Julia Chatterley is a British journalist and the former host of First Move on CNN, and First Move with Julia Chatterley on CNN International. She studied at the London School of Economics and Political Science.

== Career ==
Chatterley has worked for PBS's Nightly Business Report, and Bloomberg. She has working experience in finance and worked for Morgan Stanley in London.
