= George Howell (journalist) =

American journalist

- Born: Amarillo, Texas, U.S.
- Education: University of Texas at Austin
- Occupations: Television reporter, newscaster
- Known for: News Anchor for CNN
- Spouse: Kristian Howell

George Howell is an American journalist. He is the former anchor of CNN International's CNN Newsroom. He also reported for the network's weekday morning television show New Day.

== Background ==
Howell's family moved to Austin when he was a child. After finishing secondary education at Stephen F. Austin High School, he then attended the University of Texas at Austin where he completed a Bachelor of Journalism degree in 1999. During this period he was selected as a finalist in a national competition for excellence in journalism by the William Randolph Hearst Foundation.

== Career ==
In 1999, he started working as a news reporter for KREM-TV2, a CBS affiliate in Spokane, Washington. He later joined KXAN-TV 36, KCTS Television, and the Seattle-based KOMO-TV 4, KIRO-TV 7. He later joined the Atlanta-based WSB-TV 2, an ABC affiliate.

In 2013, Howell was hired by CNN as a news reporter along with Alina Machado, who also came from WSB, and Pamela Brown. He was first assigned as a national correspondent in CNN's Chicago bureau

The New York Association of Black Journalists and the Atlanta Association of Black Journalists have recognized Howell for his work as a journalist. In 2015, he was awarded the Native Star Award by the Greater Austin Black Chamber. Howell also earned several Emmy nominations.

On February 29, 2020, Howell announced he was leaving CNN.
