= CNN Today =

Former global news program on CNN International

- Genre: News Program
- Presented by: Michael Holmes, Amara Walker

Production
- Production locations: CNN Center, Atlanta
- Camera setup: Multiple-camera setup
- Running time: 150 minutes

Original release
- Network: CNN International
- Release: March 2004 – September 2009
- Release: November 2, 2014 – September 20, 2019

Related
- New Day

CNN Today is a global news program on CNN International aimed as a morning show for Asia. The show aired weekdays from 5am to 5:30am and 6am to 8am HKT.

The program was set to premiere on October 19, 2014, but because of a delay, the show premiered on November 2 instead.

== Original series ==
At its start, the Asian edition ran for three and a half hours (later reduced to just three hours) and the European edition ran for three hours. In both editions, the show had 6 segments between breaks every hour. At the top of the hour, both editions cover the top stories of the morning.

The second segment in the Asian edition takes a look at business headlines and introduces the first of 3 weather updates. Its third and fourth segments looks more in-depth at some top stories. The fifth segment continues with some technology and more business headlines, and sports and lighter stories as well as the business traveler's weather advisory are given before the hour ends.

The European edition has its first weather update before the 1st break and continues with major news reports on the 2nd segment. Business stories are reported before the bottom of the hour. At the bottom of the hour, world news headlines are recapped before going to more in-depth coverage of current issues. A 2nd weather report is also presented at this time. Like the Asian edition, sports stories and the business traveler's weather advisory are presented before the top of the hour.

In late 2004, the anchor lineups were changed. Monita Rajpal, who was based at CNN Center in Atlanta, moved to London to present the European edition with Richard Quest, while Hala Gorani subsequently moved to Atlanta. In early 2005, Quest stepped down as anchor to become a special correspondent, and Max Foster was hired to anchor the European edition with Rajpal.

As for the Asian edition, Stan Grant left CNN in early 2005 to return to Australia. Hugh Riminton, another Australian, was hired to anchor the Asian edition with Kristie Lu Stout. During the Riminton-Lu Stout era, the programme won the Asian Television Award for Asia-Pacific's Best News Programme.

== 2014 return ==
On November 3, 2014, instead of October 20, as first reported, the Asian morning block was rebranded to CNN Today anchored by Michael Holmes and Amara Walker at the network's headquarters in Atlanta. In 2018, while Amara Walker was on pregnancy leave, CNN London reporter Bianca Nobilo anchored with Michael Holmes. On July 23, Amara Walker returned to CNN Today. On September 18, 2020, CNN International announced CNN Today, along with International Desk and News Stream would be cancelled. The first half-hour of CNN Today would be replaced with The Brief with Bianca Nobilo as a late-night show for Europe and the remaining 90 minutes would be replaced with a new show, Your World Today with Isa Soares and Cyril Vanier which would be a new Asia-Pacific breakfast show.

== CNN Today on CNN US ==
In the late 1990s and early 2000s, CNN USA's early afternoon news program was called CNN Today. It was broadcast on weekdays between 1pm and 3pm Eastern Time.

== Anchors ==
- Michael Holmes
- Amara Walker

Former anchors

- Bianca Nobilo
