= Don Riddell =

English news anchor and sports journalist

- Education: University of Leeds
- Occupation: News Anchor
- Employer: CNN International

Don Riddell (born 7 September 1972) is an English news anchor and sports journalist. He is currently an Atlanta-based anchor of CNN's World Sport and formerly hosted CNN's Living Golf.

== Education ==
Riddell attended Trinity and All Saints College, then part of the University of Leeds and earned a B.A. with honours in Public Media/Communication and Cultural Studies.

== Career ==
Edinburgh-born Riddell joined CNN in 2002. He had previously worked at the London News Network, where he worked as a sports presenter for the London Tonight programme. He started his career at Yorkshire Television in Leeds.
