= Michael Holmes (broadcaster) =

Australian journalist

- Born: December 1960 (age 65); Perth, Australia
- Education: Wesley College
- Occupations: News anchor, correspondent

Michael Holmes is an Australian journalist, best known as news anchor and correspondent for CNN International, where he worked from 1996 to 2024. His most recent assignment was anchoring CNN Newsroom with Michael Holmes at 12am ET from Friday through Monday. Prior to that he anchored CNN Today with Amara Walker. He has also anchored the 10a ET edition of International Desk and in early 2013 joined Suzanne Malveaux as co-anchor of CNN USA's Around The World at noon ET, an hour-long bulletin focusing on international news. Previously, he was the host of CNNI's behind-the-news program BackStory and other CNN International programs.

He attended Wesley College in Perth from 1973 to 1977. Holmes began his career at the Daily News newspaper in Perth at the age of 17. Prior to his work at CNN, he was a reporter for more than a decade for Australia's Nine Network in Perth, Sydney, London and Melbourne. He spent four years based in London, covering Northern Ireland, the first Intifada, the fall of the Berlin Wall, the first Gulf War and other major stories. After returning to Australia he was later deployed to cover the Rwandan genocide in 1994.

He was the first Australian anchor hired by CNN International (commencing in 1996), and has reported extensively around the world, including nearly 20 deployments to the Iraq and Afghanistan wars, as well as the Israeli–Palestinian conflict including multiple assignments in Gaza and the West Bank and the 2011 uprising in Libya. He was also deployed to Ukraine to cover the Russian invasion in March and April 2022.

In 2004 he was in a CNN convoy ambushed by insurgents in Iraq which cost the lives of two staff members. One deployment to Iraq during the deadliest time of the war resulted in the CNN Documentary "Month of Mayhem", which won the 2007 CINE "Golden Eagle" and won a second Golden Eagle for his work on the documentary 72 Hours Under Fire. He has won numerous other awards including two Peabody Awards for coverage of the Iraq War and the battle for Mosul in 2017, and an Edward R Murrow Award for coverage of Hurricane Maria.

In November 2024, Holmes announced his retirement from CNN after 28 years.

Holmes has more than 40 years' experience in journalism and has visited or worked as a foreign correspondent in more than 80 countries. He currently resides in Atlanta.
