= Natalie Allen =

American journalist

- Born: August 11, 1962 (age 63); Memphis, Tennessee, U.S.
- Education: University of Southern Mississippi (BA)
- Occupation: Journalist
- Employers: CNN (1992–2001); CNN International (2009–2020); Newsy/Scripps News (2020–present)

Natalie Allen (born August 11, 1962) is an American broadcast journalist. She worked for CNN International as a weekend anchor at their global headquarters in Atlanta, Georgia, until October 4, 2020. Prior to this role at CNN, Allen was an anchor for the network's American newsroom from 1992 to 2001. Allen has also been an anchor for MSNBC and was a national correspondent for NBC, during which she appeared on Nightly News, Today, and CNBC.

She left CNN in October 2020. As of 2021, she is working at Scripps News.

== Early life and education ==
Allen was born in Memphis, Tennessee. She graduated from the University of Southern Mississippi in 1984 with a bachelor's degree in radio, television, and film. She has since been inducted into the University of Southern Mississippi's Alumni Hall of Fame.

== Career ==
Allen spent the first year of her career as a reporter for KFSM-TV in Fort Smith, Arkansas. Allen then became a reporter and anchor at WREG-TV in Memphis, Tennessee. Prior to joining CNN, Allen reported and co-anchored for WFTV in Orlando, Florida, winning a regional Emmy Award and Edward R. Murrow Award. From 2007 to 2009, Allen served as The Weather Channel's first full-time environment and climate correspondent where she served as a primary anchor for the network's weekly news program, Forecast Earth. In 2011, Allen developed a three-part series called The Children of the Dump which aired on CNN International as part of its Freedom Project. The series is about Allen's experience in Vietnam's Mekong Delta and witnessing a story about child trafficking. Allen is also a keynote speaker and moderator. She has moderated events such as Fortune Magazine's Brainstorm Green Conference and Microsoft's Top 100 CEO Summit. Allen also was the keynote speaker for the University of Memphis Journalism Awards in 2012.
