= Amanda Davies =

English sports presenter

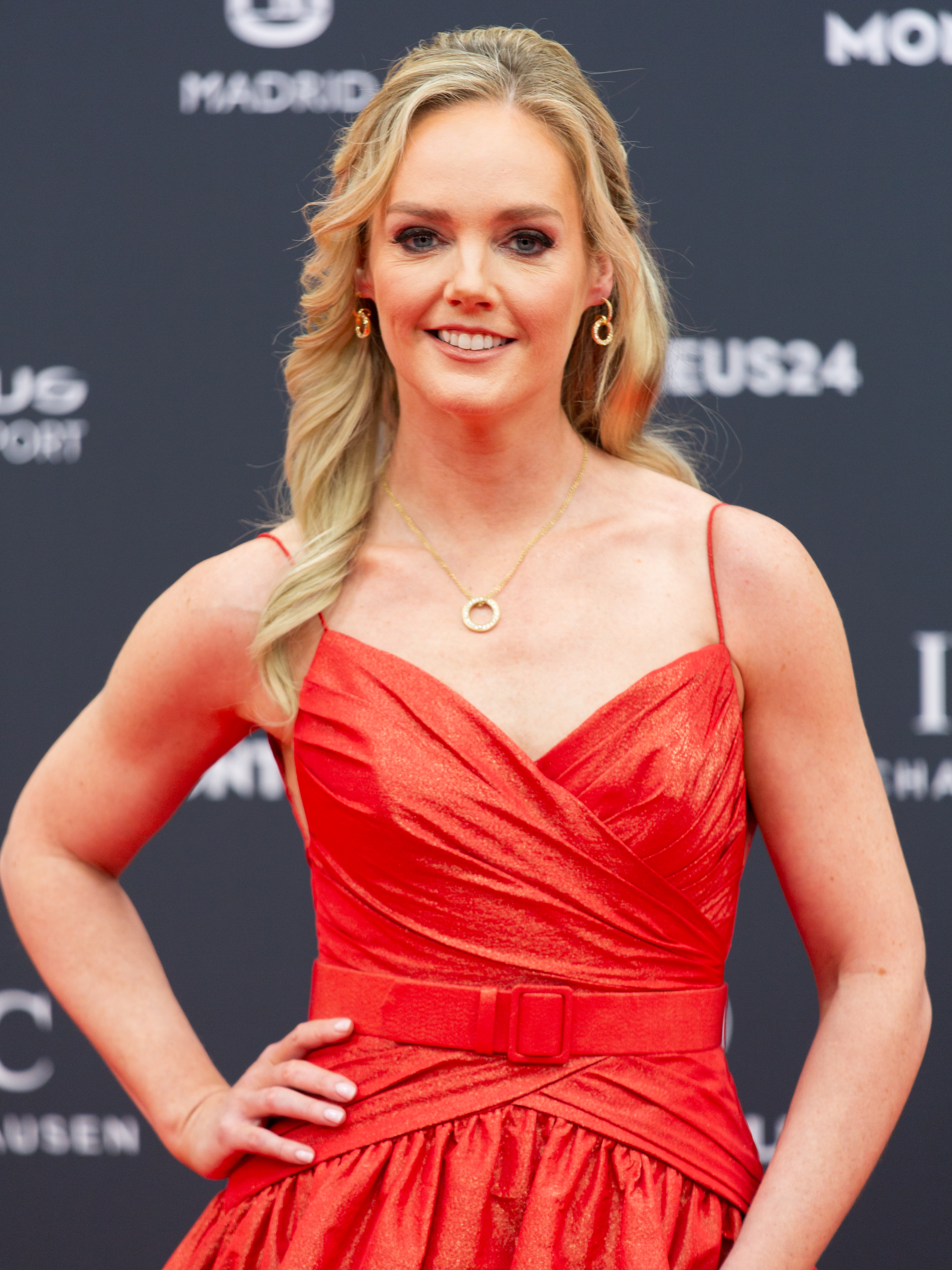
- Davies in 2024
- Born: 24 March 1980 (age 46); Manchester, England
- Education: St Edmund Hall, Oxford
- Occupation: Sports journalist
- Years active: 2001–present
- Family: David Davies (father)

Amanda Davies (born 24 March 1980) is an English sports presenter on CNN International.

== Early life ==
Davies was born on 24 March 1980 in Manchester. She is the daughter of sports journalist and sports administrator David Davies. She was educated from the age of five to nine at Haberdashers' Aske's School for Girls in Elstree, Hertfordshire, before the family moved to the Midlands, where she continued her education at King Edward VI High School for Girls in Edgbaston, Birmingham. She graduated from St Edmund Hall, Oxford, in 2001 with a degree in geography, where she won the Philip Geddes Memorial Prize for journalism.

== Career ==
=== Sky Sports ===
Davies joined Sky Sports as a runner straight from university in 2001. Later as an assistant producer she worked on a wide range of live sporting events, including the Cricket World Cup and US Open. Davies joined Sky Sports News and worked in several positions, including assistant news editor, presenter and on-the-road producer, most notably spending seven weeks in Berlin producing the Sky Sports News coverage of the 2006 FIFA World Cup from Germany. She was also an occasional reporter, making her presenting debut on Sky Sports News with Ian Payne in 2005.

=== BBC ===
She joined the BBC in April 2007. She was a regular presenter of sports bulletins on the BBC News Channel (formerly News 24), BBC World News, and Breakfast on BBC One, as well as the sports bulletins on the BBC 1 weekend news. She was the presenter of BBC News F1 preview show Inside F1 every Friday and Saturday of race weekends, and in the 2008–09 season she presented a weekly chat-based football programme on BBC World called Sport Today: Football Review.

In August 2011, Davies was given her own football show on BBC World News called Sports World Have Your Say, a global interactive conversation between football fans around the world. It was a weekly show airing on Sunday evenings.

Davies was also a regular presenter of the BBC Sport's Your News, travelling around the country to a different location every week, telling viewers' stories.

=== CNN ===
On 27 March 2012, CNN confirmed that Davies would join their team of sports presenters from April. Davies is the main sports anchor on CNN, and hosts daily sports news show World Sport, as well as monthly F1 show The Circuit.

She has fronted CNN's coverage of all the major international sports events since joining, including the Olympics in London 2012, Sochi 2014, Rio 2016 and Pyeongchang 2018; the 2014 FIFA World Cup in Brazil, 2016 European Championships in France and the 2018 FIFA World Cup in Russia.

=== Charity work ===
After the premature birth of her daughter Molly, Davies became a supporter of a number of baby charities. On 30 January 2012, it was announced that she had become the patron of the Milk Bank at Queen Charlotte's and Chelsea Hospital, where Molly was born 9 weeks early. She is also an Ambassador for Sparks, and supporter of Bliss.

== Personal life ==
Davies lives in West London with her daughter Molly (b. 2009). She is also a supporter of Manchester United F.C.
