= Diplomatic License =

1994–2006 American news TV series

- Presented by: Richard Roth
- Country of origin: United States
- Original language: English

Production
- Executive producer: Liz Neisloss

Original release
- Network: CNN
- Release: 1994 – 2006

Diplomatic License is a weekly CNN International news program covering the United Nations which ran from 1994 to 2006. The show takes its name from the legal concept of diplomatic immunity. It was hosted by Richard Roth, CNN's UN correspondent and executive produced by Liz Neisloss. The program featured interviews with UN insiders such as Mark Malloch Brown, chief of staff to former Secretary-General Kofi Annan, as well as with Annan himself. Additionally, the program featured debates among a rotating panel of journalists covering the UN and international diplomacy, moderated by Roth. The program was filmed in New York City due to the location of United Nations headquarters.

== See also ==
- Diplomatic Immunity (Canadian TV series), similar Canadian program
