= Amber Lyon =

American journalist and photographer

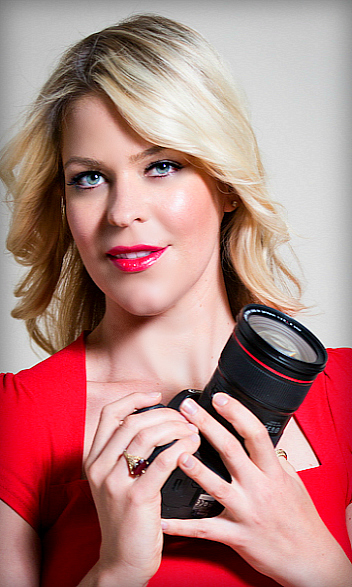
- Born: Amber Elizabeth Lyon; November 9, 1982 (age 43); Denver, Colorado, U.S.
- Occupations: Journalist, Filmmaker, Photographer

Amber Elizabeth Lyon (born November 9, 1982) is an American investigative journalist and photographer. She is known for her work reporting human rights abuses against pro-democracy protesters in Bahrain and in the United States.

== Early life and education ==
Amber Lyon was born in Denver, Colorado, and grew up in St. Louis, Missouri. She attended the University of Missouri School of Journalism, earning a Bachelor's degree in Broadcast Journalism.

== Career ==
Following her graduation from the University of Missouri, Lyon began reporting for KVOA in Tucson, Arizona. In October 2006, Lyon won a regional Emmy Award, from the Rocky Mountain Southwest Chapter of the National Academy of Television Arts and Sciences, for a late-breaking feature news item called "Fantasy". She shared the Emmy with KVOA chief photographer Paul Hanke. In October 2007 she received her second regional Rocky Mountain Southwest Chapter Emmy for "best on-camera talent reporter – general assignment". One month later, Lyon left KVOA to take Spanish-language immersion classes in Costa Rica and Guatemala. In October 2008, Lyon again won the Rocky Mountain Emmy Award for best on-camera talent. In June 2010, she began working for CNN, where she investigated sex trafficking, the Gulf oil spill, and the hacking collective known as Anonymous. Her investigations have focused on cultural, social, and government demonstrations and revolutions; human rights violations; sex trafficking; and environmental issues.

=== 2010 Gulf of Mexico oil spill ===
In July 2010, Lyon was the first journalist to scuba dive under the Deepwater Horizon oil spill, while broadcasting live on television. Her report, presented on CNN, revealed how BP's use of dispersants was sinking the oil into the water column, turning it into what she called "hidden oil", that could not be cleaned up or skimmed out of the water. Lyon and dive partner Philippe Cousteau Jr. found beads of broken down oil floating ten feet into the water column and questioned why BP would sink the oil, if that meant the oil would be impossible to clean up. Lyon's investigative reports from the Gulf of Mexico contributed to CNN winning a Peabody Award for oil spill coverage.

=== 2010 Craigslist sex trafficking ===
In 2010, Lyon investigated the sex trafficking of US minors on the online classified site Craigslist. Attorneys General from 17 states sent a letter to the online classified site demanding the closure of the adult services section, citing portions of Lyon's investigation in the letter. As a result, Craigslist closed down the section worldwide. Lyon also won a Gracie Award for women in media for the story.

=== 2011 Arab Spring ===
In 2011, CNN sent a four-person investigative film crew to Bahrain to examine the use of social media and Internet technology in facilitating the Arab Spring, or revolution, in Egypt, Tunisia, and Bahrain. The resulting work was entitled iRevolution: Online Warriors of the Arab Spring, featured Lyon as the on-air correspondent. The documentary was honored with a 2012 New York Festivals International Television and Film Gold World Medal Award. Lyon and the documentary producer, Taryn Fixel, were recognized as finalists for the 2011 Livingston Award for Young Journalists for their work on the documentary.

Prior to arriving in Bahrain, the CNN film crew had made arrangements for support and assistance from locals for the planned eight days that they were in the country. Interviews were scheduled with various individuals, who planned on participating in the documentary and speaking about the ongoing civil unrest and desire for governmental change in the region. While preparing for the interviews, following their arrival in the country, the CNN crew discovered that the majority of their contacts had gone into hiding or outright refused to participate, due to fears of retaliation from the governing regime. Actual acts of retaliation for those that participated included criminal charges, loss of employment, and destruction of family homes through fire.

The Bahraini individuals that were interviewed include doctors, patients, and civilians, who showed Lyon how they were tortured during an intense crackdown on protests, as well as after Bahraini Security forces took over the country's main hospital. Lyon also investigated and reported on Bahrain's systematic use of tear gas as a crowd-control device. She reported that while the tear gas was approved by the United Nations as a peace-keeping measure, the use resulted in the suffocation of protesters. In interviews following the reports, Lyon stated that she fears that the daily and nightly tear gassing will have long-term health effects on Bahrain's people.

After evading their government minders and covertly entering villages to document human rights abuses in Bahrain, the film crew experienced direct retaliation when they were detained at gunpoint with machine guns. According to Lyon, while the CNN team was detained, Bahraini security forces attempted to confiscate and destroy all of the processed film, however, Lyon and her producer were able to conceal vital video footage, which was used to create the documentary.

The documentary iRevolution was produced by CNN and was aired by CNN US though never aired on CNN international.

Lyon worked with journalist Glenn Greenwald to investigate and present their findings and summation that the government of Bahrain, as well as other governments throughout the world, are paying CNN for special content casting their countries in a positive light. While CNN International denies Lyon's claims of censorship or any wrongdoing, they confirmed that they receive payment from the Bahrain Economic Development Board for advertising. The response of CNN International was criticized and dismissed by both Lyon and Greenwald for failing to address the crux of their claim.

=== 2012 Anaheim police shooting and protests ===
Lyon also reported on the aftermath of the July 21, 2012, shooting of Manuel Diaz in Anaheim, California, by local police officers responding to a neighborhood watch call. When the officers arrived and approached the group, the three men started to flee the scene. During the chase, the unarmed Diaz was fatally shot by one of the officers.

In response to the protests and rioting following the shooting of Diaz, the Anaheim Police Department brought out riot gear in attempts to control the crowds. While attempting to report on the shooting, along with citywide protests, Lyon and colleague Tim Pool were fired upon by members of the Anaheim Police Department who were using non-lethal ammunition. The incident was captured on video, due to live filming at the time. Lyon reported that she had to hide between two trucks for several minutes to avoid being hit.

=== Whistleblowing on CNN International's coverage of Bahrain ===
On September 5, 2012, with the help of journalist Glenn Greenwald, Lyon accused the channel CNN International of not airing her documentary on the Bahrain uprising because of unlawful business practices. In an article by Greenwald in The Guardian newspaper, Lyon accused the network of censoring the documentary because the Bahrain regime was paying for sponsored content on the network. The article also claims that the government of Bahrain, as well as other governments throughout the world, are paying CNN International for similar sponsored content, casting their countries in a positive light.

The UK's independent watchdog, OFCOM, investigated similar claims and found CNN International (and other news broadcasters) had been guilty of airing sponsored content that wasn't labelled as such. However it also found that these oversights had not compromised editorial independence and that steps had been taken to improve transparency.

=== Advocacy of psychedelic drugs ===
In early 2014, Lyon launched an advocacy site called reset.me, a group for the emotional healing benefits of certain psychedelic drugs, based on her own experience with them, and on her research into the history of their use.

== Honors and awards ==
- 2006 – Emmy Award, Rocky Mountain Southwest Chapter: feature news report within 24 hours
- 2007 – Emmy Award, Rocky Mountain Southwest Chapter: best on-camera talent
- 2008 – Emmy Award, Rocky Mountain Southwest Chapter: best on-camera talent
