= CNN Business Traveller =

- Genre: Business, travel
- Presented by: Richard Quest

Production
- Production location: Varies
- Camera setup: Multiple-camera setup
- Running time: 30 minutes (inc. adverts)

Original release
- Network: CNN International
- Release: 2002 – present

CNN Business Traveller is a monthly television program on CNN International hosted by Richard Quest.

The program was launched in 2002 and the program investigates various topics related to business related travel, including airlines, airport lounges, frequent-flyer programs, hotels and the travelling lifestyle.

James Williams was also a producer and occasional presenter on the program, before being given his own CNN program in 2016 titled In 24 Hours.

In 2016, the program attempted a stunt to fly around the world travelling only on low cost carriers, comparing experiences on each airline and interviewing executives from the carriers over two episodes of CNN Business Traveller. Quest travelled on 10 airlines, through 9 countries across 8 days.
