= In 24 Hours =

2015–2017 travel TV series

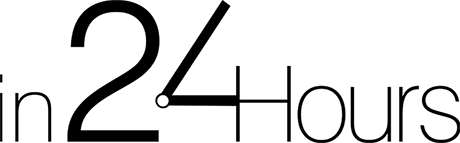
- Genre: Travel
- Presented by: James Williams
- No. of series: 2
- No. of episodes: 17

Production
- Production location: Varies
- Camera setup: Multiple-camera setup
- Running time: 30 minutes (inc. adverts)
- Production company: CNN Vision

Original release
- Network: CNN International
- Release: December 9, 2015 – August 1, 2017

In 24 Hours is a monthly travel television program on CNN International hosted by James Williams.

The program premiered on 9 December 2015 and follows Williams spending a full day and night in a different city each episode, exploring culture, sights and unique experiences, focusing on the premium travel market. In many episodes, local celebrities are featured including Andrew Lloyd Webber and Anthony Bourdain.

Williams was a producer and occasional presenter on long running CNN travel program CNN Business Traveller before being given his own show.

The first and second seasons of the program are sponsored by Qatar Airways. The program returned for a second season on September 7, 2016.

== Episodes ==
Season	Episodes	Originally released	
Season	Episodes	First released	Last released
1	5	December 9, 2015	April 6, 2016
2	12	7 September 2016	August 2, 2017

=== Season 1 ===
No. overall	No. in season	Destination	Original release date
1	1	New York City, United States	December 9, 2015
James finds out what chef Anthony Bourdain's favourite places are, a flyover of Manhattan in a Blade helicopter, explores the secrets of Grand Central Station and visits the world's most expensive penthouse.
2	2	Hong Kong	January 6, 2016
James gets a martial arts lesson, visits the family of acclaimed tailor Ascot Chang and goes paragliding. Jimmy Choo reveals his favourite things about Hong Kong.
3	3	Buenos Aires, Argentina	February 3, 2016
James takes a helicopter ride to the Puesto Viejo polo club and learns the sport from Santiago de Astrada, goes wine tasting and gets a close shave from the most sought-after barber in the city.
4	4	Sydney, Australia	March 2, 2016
In his home town James goes sailing with 2015 Sydney to Hobart Yacht Race winner Paul Clitheroe, visits animals at the Symbio Wildlife Park, takes a surf lesson from Stephanie Gilmore and has dinner beside the Sydney Opera House.
5	5	Milan, Italy	April 6, 2016
James takes a Ferrari 488 for a spin at the Autodromo Nazionale Monza circuit, chats to Giorgio Armani at Milan Fashion Week and searches for truffles.

=== Season 2 ===
No. overall	No. in season	Destination	Original release date
6	1	Los Angeles, United States	September 7, 2016
James takes a yoga class at the Four Seasons in Beverley Hills, discovers Moon Juice in the Silver Lake neighbourhood, takes a tour of the Warner Bros studio lot and gets a rare invite to the Academy of Magical Arts.
7	2	London, United Kingdom	October 5, 2016
James takes to the All England Tennis Club with Pat Cash, has lunch with chef Jamie Oliver, heads to Old Bond Street for some shopping and takes a helicopter ride over the unique London skyline.
8	3	Shanghai, China	November 2, 2016
James begins his day in Shanghai on the Jin Mao Tower Skywalk.
9	4	Atlanta, United States	December 7, 2016
James has a Southern breakfast with Hines Ward, visits the Centre for Civil and Human Rights, visits a film set of The Walking Dead and visits the Stankonia Studios.
10	5	Marrakesh, Morocco	January 4, 2017
James takes a hot air balloon ride over the city.
11	6	Cape Town, South Africa	February 1, 2017
James takes a scenic look at sights and views in the city.
12	7	Auckland, New Zealand	March 1, 2017
James visits the city of sails and takes in the cuisine and culture of New Zealand as well as bungee jumping off the Auckland Harbour Bridge.
13	8	Barcelona, Spain	April 5, 2017
14	9	Montreal, Canada	May 3, 2017
15	10	Bangkok, Thailand	June 7, 2017
16	11	Dublin, Ireland	July 5, 2017
17	12	Miami, United States	August 2, 2017
