= Becky Anderson =

British journalist

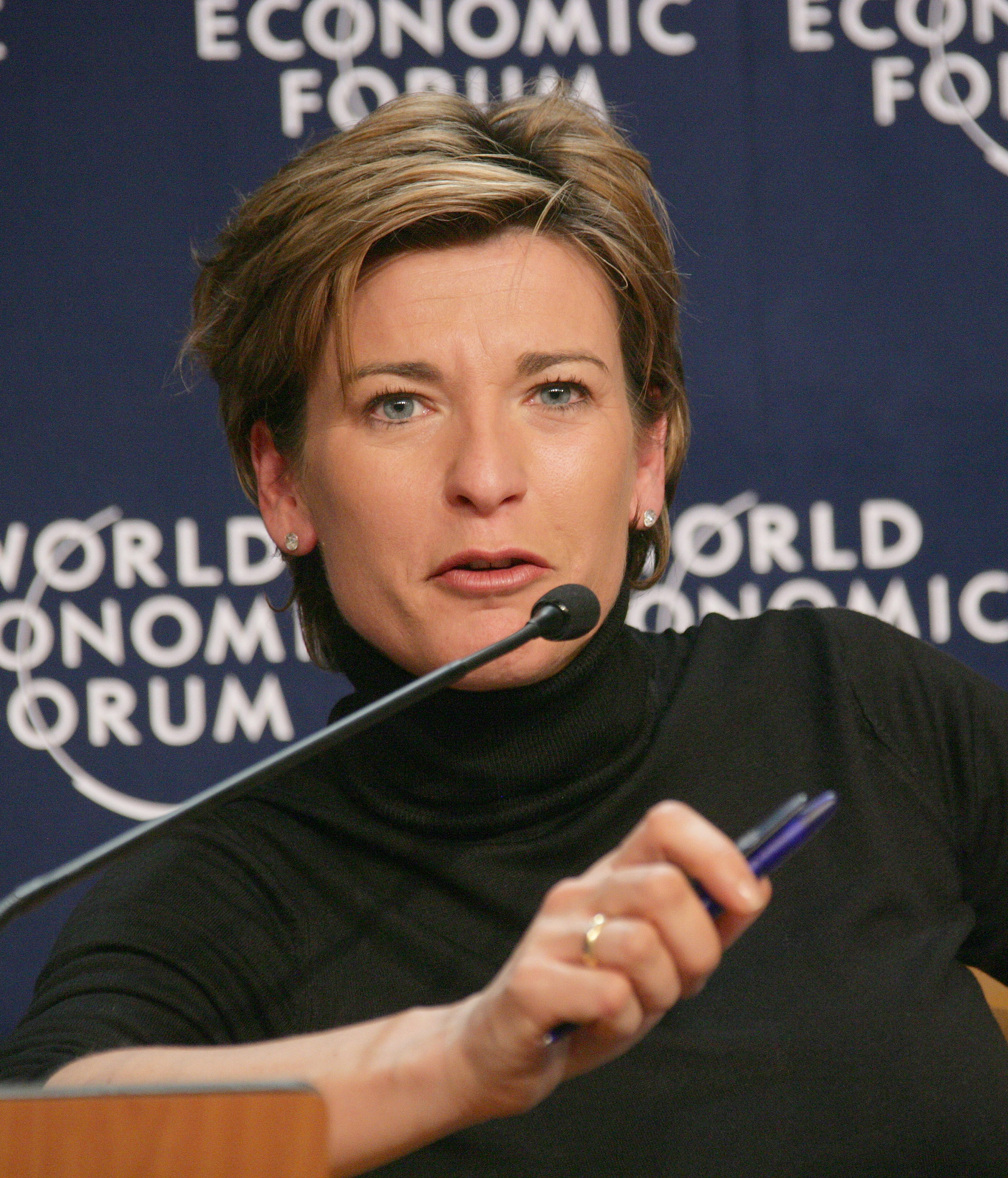
- Anderson at the 2006 World Economic Forum meeting in Davos
- Born: 15 November 1967 (age 58); England
- Education: University of Sussex; Arizona State University
- Occupations: Journalist, news anchor
- Employer: CNN
- Notable credit: CNN International's Connect the World Anchor (2009–present)

Rebecca Anderson (born 15 November 1967) is a British journalist and the anchor of CNN International's flagship news and current affairs primetime news program Connect the World. She previously hosted Business International.

== Life ==
Anderson was born in England. She holds a bachelor's degree in Economics and French from the University of Sussex, and a master's degree in Mass Communication from Arizona State University.

She worked for Bloomberg and CNBC before joining CNN in 1999.
