= News Stream =

2010–2019 television news program

- Genre: News Program
- Presented by: Kristie Lu Stout
- No. of seasons: 9

Production
- Production locations: CNN Asia Pacific, Hong Kong
- Camera setup: Multiple-camera setup
- Running time: 60 minutes 30 minutes (for ViuTVsix)

Original release
- Network: CNN International; ViuTVsix (Hong Kong)
- Release: November 8, 2010 – June 28, 2019

News Stream is a global news program on CNN International that aired as a weekday prime time show for Asian audiences. The program was filmed in Hong Kong and anchored by Kristie Lu Stout. From 9 pm to 10 pm HKT (UTC+8:00), it covered Asia's increasing influence in business and politics to technology and culture. The program was simulcast on ViuTVsix in Hong Kong, but in a half-hour format.

The program lasted nine years, ending due to budget cuts in June 2019. This resulted in CNN's Hong Kong bureau not producing any daily programming for the first time since its inauguration in the 1990s. Lu Stout moved on to feature programs, reporting, and occasionally filling in for Rosemary Church and Max Foster on CNN Newsroom.
