= The ATTIK =

- Industry: Advertising
- Founded: 1986
- Defunct: 2015
- Website: attik.com at the Wayback Machine (archived 2009-03-01)

The ATTIK, later known as ATTIK, was a British advertising agency founded in 1986 in Huddersfield, England by James Sommerville and Simon Needham. They are best known for their progressive and influential graphic design style, their series of "Noise" experimental design books, and their work for clients including, Coca-Cola, Sony PlayStation, MTV, Toyota, and Adidas.

== Overview ==
ATTIK was founded by Sommerville and Needham in Sommerville's grandma's attic bedroom Huddersfield England, with the help of a £2,000 grant from Prince Charles' The Prince's Trust. By 1990, the company originally employed eight people and had moved to a rented office space. Sommerville and Needham had also begun experimenting with the newly released Adobe Photoshop software on their 8 kHz Macintosh Plus.

In 1992, future partner Will Travis joined the company. By early 1995, ATTIK had grown the Huddersfield team to 25 people, and later that year they opened an office in London, having secured work with Sony's PlayStation brand. Sommerville set up a New York office in January 1997, followed by Travis opening a studio in San Francisco in 1998, and Needham establishing a presence in Sydney in 1999. By the end of 2000, benefitting largely from the Dotcom boom, the company was turning over $20 million and had 160 staff across its studios in Huddersfield, London, New York, San Francisco, and Sydney.

The economic crash of 2001 hit the company hard, and based on the advice of new board member Ric Peralta, 115 staff were let go in order to keep the business afloat. The London, New York, and Sydney studios were closed, leaving Huddersfield and San Francisco as the only locations running. Between 2002 and 2003, the company was in survival mode. However, in 2003, two clients helped to secure the business' immediate future – Scion, a new brand from Toyota launching in the U.S. – and the Camel cigarette company in Europe. In 2004, Peralta and Travis were made partners and the Huddersfield office moved to Leeds. A new office was opened in Los Angeles, and New York was reopened.

In 2007, ATTIK was acquired by the Japan-based Dentsu Network.

The San Francisco studio continued to serve as Scion's advertising Agency of Record in the U.S., and ATTIK Leeds partnered with Coca-Cola on series of brand and design initiatives. In 2012, Sommerville decided to leave the business, citing “a lack of alignment of strategic thinking”, and the company's UK operations were wound down.

In April 2015 it was announced that the company would be absorbed by Dentsu following the loss of the long-running Scion advertising account, effectively bringing an end to ATTIK's existence after 29 years of operation

== Notable clients ==
- Coca-Cola
- Nike
- Lexus
- Camel
- LucasArts/Star Wars
- Boost Mobile
- Sony Online Entertainment
- MTV
- NFL
- Carlsberg
- IGN Entertainment
- AOL
- Virgin Atlantic
- Ford
- Sheppard Robson
