= Paula Hancocks =

British journalist

Paula Hancocks is an international correspondent for CNN television news network. She is based in Abu Dhabi, and is the channel's representative in the Arabian Peninsula.

== Career ==
Hancocks joined CNN in 1997, and had broadcast from its London branch. Among others, she covered the Israeli–Palestinian conflict, and Israel's conflict with Hezbollah in 2006.
