= Kate Riley =

British-American sports journalist

- Born: Bakersfield, California, United States
- Education: Leicester University (BA); Cardiff University (MA)
- Occupation: International sports television presenter
- Years active: 2005–present
- Employer: CNN
- Known for: BBC Radio; Fox Sports; IMG Media; Sky Sports News; CNN International
- Spouse: Walter Czarnecki

Kate Riley is a British-American international sports television presenter and journalist currently working for CNN International.

== Early life ==
Riley was born in Bakersfield, California, to an American mother and English father, and spent time as a child in Hong Kong, Brunei, Cameroon and the United Kingdom. After attending the Ipswich High School for Girls in England, she studied for her master's degree in broadcast journalism at Cardiff University in Wales in 2005 and 2006.

Prior to her broadcasting career, Riley studied geography at Leicester University in England. From 2004 to 2005 she was controller of the university's radio station, Lush FM.

== Career ==
After graduating from university, Riley worked for BBC Radio Norfolk from September 2007 until 2011 as a journalist. She then moved onto BBC Look East, also based in Norwich, where she did some presenting and sports reporting work. From November 2010 until October 2011, she also worked as a sports reporter and bulletin reader for BBC Radio Cambridgeshire.

She briefly worked for Essex FM in 2007 as the sports editor, while joining the Premier League Productions and Fox Sports (USA) teams in 2012. Riley joined NBC Sports in August 2012, providing breaking news on the Premier League to the American news channel from England. She also featured as Match Day Live TV reporter, and continues to freelance for NBC Sports. In August 2012, Riley also joined IMG Media, reporting on the Premier League to a global audience.

She joined Sky Sports News as a TV reporter in December 2012, presenting bulletins and news while focusing on the Premier League and Football League Championship. Riley also co-hosted the daily 'Good Morning Sports Fans' program. Riley re-joined Fox Sports in 2014, reporting for the Australian version, before becoming a sports presenter for BFBS in the same year.

In February 2015, Riley joined Qatari-based Al Jazeera Media Network as a sports broadcaster. She continued her international work in June 2015, while working as an anchor of World Sport for CNN International in the Greater Atlanta area after a brief stint freelancing during the 2015 Women's World Cup in Canada.

Off screen, Riley has also hosted a number of events. She led the Colchester United end of season awards ceremony in 2014, as well as the Football Blogging Awards the same summer. Riley has also been involved with the Inside Line, Carling Fan Events at Wembley and London events for the 2014 Sochi Winter Olympics.

== Personal life ==
Riley speaks English, French, German and Basic Arabic. She supports Ipswich Town, her local club for a period of her childhood, and held a season ticket for five years prior to working full-time. While focusing on sport on camera, she also regularly competes in triathlons, marathons and half-marathons.

She is part of the Women In Football network, which was founded in 2007 to offer support to female peers in the male-dominated industry. Riley claims her interest in football was initially sparked during her time in Cameroon, with Roger Milla an influential football figure in the area at the time.

Her father, Brian Riley, made news in March 2015 when the former banker refused to give up his position in the Suffolk County Council, despite moving to the United States. The move proved controversial after it was revealed he would continue to claim his allowance despite being in California.

Riley married Omnimetrix President and CEO Walter Czarnecki in his hometown of Philadelphia, Pennsylvania on 10 February 2018.
