= Kristie Lu Stout =

American journalist

- 魯可蒂
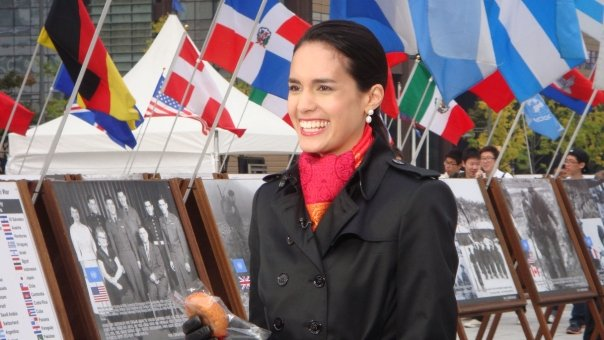
- Stout reporting in Seoul, South Korea
- Born: December 7, 1974 (age 51); Philadelphia, Pennsylvania, U.S.
- Education: Stanford University (BA, MA); Tsinghua University
- Occupations: CNN news anchor; journalist
- Spouse: Seung Chong
- Children: 1

Kristie Lu Stout (simplified Chinese: 鲁可蒂; traditional Chinese: 魯可蒂; pinyin: Lǔ Kědì, born December 7, 1974) is an American journalist and news anchor for CNN International. She currently hosts the program Marketplace Asia and other feature programs. She previously hosted the daily news show News Stream, which emphasized news connected with technology, and the monthly news discussion programme, On China.

== Early life and education ==
Stout was born in Philadelphia, Pennsylvania, to a European-American father and a Taiwanese mother; as a result, she was raised in a partially Chinese-speaking household. Her mother was born to parents from Beijing and Guizhou.

Stout grew up in Saratoga, California, and graduated from Lynbrook High School in San Jose, California, where she was a founding member of the Lynbrook Speech and Debate Club, and worked as a model in her teens. She studied journalism as an undergraduate at Stanford University, writing for The Stanford Daily and KZSU. In the early 1990s, she traveled to China to learn Standard Chinese at Tsinghua University, freelance for the South China Morning Post, and worked at Sohu. In 1996, she started working as an editorial intern at Wired, and in 1997 she graduated with a master's degree in media studies from Stanford.

== Career ==
Starting from 2001, she hosted the daily World Report which earned her a 2006 Asian Television Award as Best News Presenter or Anchor when it was still called CNN Today. She occasionally also hosts the talk show Talk Asia. She previously hosted CNN's technology program Spark, their daily "Tech Watch" segment, and the monthly program Global Office. From 2010 to 2018, she hosted CNNI's premier Asia-Pacific Primetime show News Stream with Kristie Lu Stout, until it was cancelled due to budget cuts. Since then she has focused on feature programming including documentaries and anchors special breaking news events. Stout reports from the newsroom and in the field on major news stories including US-China relations, strategic tech development across Asia, and the aftermath of extreme climate events. She hosts feature programs for CNN including Tech for Good, a series on the transformative power of technology, and Marketplace Asia, CNN’s monthly business program. Since 2022, she has also anchored CNN’s New Year’s Eve Live special from Asia with special appearances from top talent across the region. Stout is also a conference speaker and moderator known for her engaging and compelling interview style.

In an interview with Options, The Edge Malaysia, Stout says she is actively promoting the CNN Freedom Project, the network’s initiative focused on reporting on modern-day slavery that is affecting millions of people, especially across the region, and engaging students in Hong Kong and Asia.

== Awards ==
Over the years, Stout's work has been nominated for multiple categories at the News and Documentary Emmy Awards. In 2026, she received a nomination at the Webby Awards for her documentary and online explainer on the resilience of global cargo shipping. She was also awarded Best Continuing News Reporting for TV and Video by the Association for International Broadcasting for team coverage of the 2019 Hong Kong Protests. Stout has been awarded Best News or Current Affairs Presenter at the Asian Academy Creative Awards. Other accolades include multiple honors from the Asia Television Awards and Best News Coverage from the Royal Television Society for her reporting on Super Typhoon Haiyan in the Philippines.

== Personal life ==
Stout lives in Hong Kong with her daughter, Arabella. She is married to the Malaysian Chinese attorney Seung Chong (張偉頌).
