= Max Foster =

CNN news presenter based in London (born 1972)

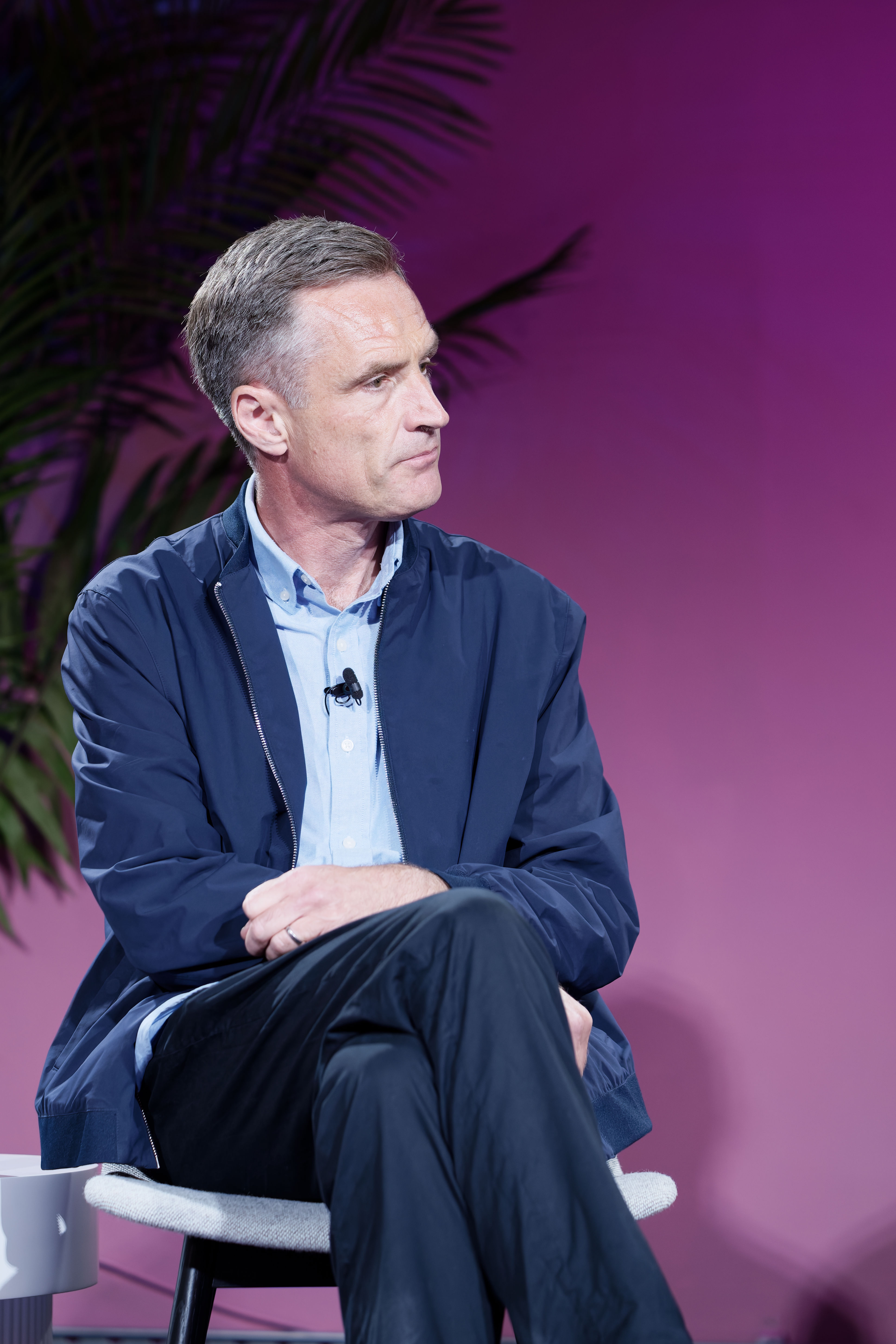
- Born: Max Foster; 30 October 1972 (age 54)
- Education: Cardiff University; Highbury College; Dauntsey's School; The Ridgeway School and Sixth Form College
- Occupation: Journalist

Max Foster (born 30 October 1972) is an anchor and correspondent for CNN, based in London. He hosts the 1pm GMT edition of CNN Newsroom.

== Education ==
Foster spent most of his childhood in Wiltshire, England where he attended The Ridgeway School and Sixth Form College and Dauntsey's School, Devizes. Foster read Business Administration at Cardiff University and completed a Postgraduate Diploma in Broadcast Journalism at Highbury College, Portsmouth.

== Early career ==
Foster started his career at the age of seventeen years old with his own weekly entertainment programme. At Cardiff University, he freelanced as a reporter for 'Rave' on BBC Radio Wales and BBC Radio 5 hosted by Rob Brydon. At graduate journalism school, he did a work placement at BBC Wiltshire Sound in Swindon and stayed on for two years. In 1997, Foster transferred to the BBC World Service as a business presenter-reporter and worked on its flagship Newshour programme. Foster made his name covering the Asian Financial Crisis and, at the age of 24, started hosting World Business Report (BBC World Service). In 2000, Foster went on attachment to BBC TV Business Programmes and stayed on. He reported for Business Breakfast, BBC World and Working Lunch before taking on a full-time position on BBC Breakfast. He had an exclusive on internet banking security which forced Abbey National (now Santander) to temporarily close down its online service, Cahoot. He also presented the business news and Breakfast Briefing alongside Moira Stuart.

== Tenure at CNN ==
In 2005 Foster joined CNN International as London-based Business Anchor and Correspondent. After hosting special coverage around the failing health of Pope John Paul II he was appointed permanent co-anchor of CNN Today with Monita Rajpal where he led special coverage of major events including the outbreak of the 2006 Lebanon War and the 2007 London car bombs. Foster broke the news that Hurricane Katrina had caused a breach in the levees around New Orleans and anchored a live six-hour simulcast on CNN and CNN International during the 2008 Mumbai attacks. Foster followed the early development of the street art movement by reporting on Banksy and Adam Neate. His candid, early, interview with bestselling author Stephenie Meyer has been widely quoted in books and magazines.

In April 2009, Foster moved to European primetime where he interviewed all living Prime Ministers of the United Kingdom; other Prime Ministers including those of Iraq, Sweden and Haiti; the presidents of the European Commission, Georgia and the Maldives; business leaders including Bill Gates, Alan Mulally, Jack Dorsey, Bob Dudley and Steve Jobs; and celebrities like Dolly Parton, Diddy, Keith Richards, Michael Caine, Carrie Underwood, Amitabh Bachchan and George Lucas. He devised a monthly show called Edit Room for CNN which went to air in June 2010 for a year. In it, he discussed news coverage with notable guests including Emma Thompson, P. J. O'Rourke and the photojournalist Tim Hetherington shortly before he was killed in Libya. In February 2013, Foster interviewed actress Thandiwe Newton and she revealed the abuse she suffered on the casting couch as a teenager, a story that was picked up by other media. Another notable interview Foster conducted was with the Dean of St Paul's Cathedral the day before Margaret Thatcher's funeral. David Ison spoke of the hurt and anger left by the former Prime Minister which was picked up on the front page of The Times and in other news outlets

After reporting on the wedding of Prince William to Catherine Middleton in 2011, Foster was given the additional title of Royal Correspondent. He traveled extensively with the couple and Prince Harry and secured several landmark royal interviews. In 2013 he interviewed Prince William shortly after the birth of his son, Prince George of Cambridge which made headlines worldwide. In 2015, he interviewed The Prince of Wales to mark ten years of marriage to The Duchess of Cornwall and secured the first TV interview ever with The Duchess to mark her 70th birthday in 2017. In 2012 he interviewed Queen Margrethe II to mark her 40th jubilee (described as "remarkable" by The Times - 14 Jan 2012). Other royal exclusives have been picked up by The Daily Telegraph. Foster has been quoted by various newspapers including The Washington Post, The Australian, and The Jakarta Post; and has been widely used as a royal commentator by the likes of ABC Radio National, BBC One (Diamond Jubilee special, 5 June 2012), Entertainment Tonight, Seven Network and BBC Radio 5 Live (Breakfast, 19th Sept 2012).

In May 2014, Foster was promoted to Anchor/London Correspondent, retaining the royal brief but also heading-up all UK affairs. A combative interview in January 2015 with Bobby Jindal about the existence of 'so-called no-go zones' in London was widely picked up by US media. During the US presidential campaign he also challenged Republican Donald Trump on his foreign policy

Foster regularly anchors from the field on major breaking news and events including the Scottish independence referendum, the 2015 United Kingdom general election and 2017, the 2016 United Kingdom European Union membership referendum and the Grenfell Tower fire. He has also anchored from the scene of terror attacks across Europe including November 2015 Paris attacks, the 2016 Brussels bombings, the 2016 Nice truck attack, the 2016 Berlin truck attack, the 2017 London Bridge attack and the 2017 Stockholm truck attack.

Foster is currently hosting 'What we know with Max Foster'. He is a commentator on US affairs for LBC, trains anchors for CNN affiliates and regularly moderates and hosts public events for the likes of the United Nations World Tourism Organization.

== Personal life ==
Foster lives near Newbury, Berkshire with his wife Hannah and three young children.
