= Amara Walker =

American journalist and news anchor

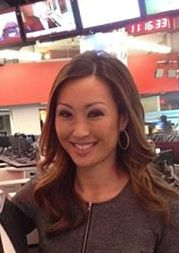
- Amara Walker anchoring on CNN
- Born: Amara Sohn; November 30, 1981 (age 44); Los Angeles, California, U.S.
- Other name: Amarа
- Occupations: Journalist, public relations official
- Employer: CNN (until 2025)
- Spouse: Thomas Walker (m. 2012)
- Children: 2

Amara Walker, or Amara Sohn-Walker ( /ˈæmərə/; née Sohn, born November 30, 1981), is an American journalist, public relations official, and a former news anchor for CNN This Morning Weekend. She also was a correspondent on CNN.

== Early life and education ==
Walker was born and raised outside Los Angeles. In 2003, she graduated from the University of Southern California with a double degree in broadcast journalism and political science.

== Career ==
Walker started her career at KMIR-TV in Palm Springs. In 2005, Walker joined the NBC-owned WTVJ in Miami, Florida, where she worked as a news anchor and a general assignment reporter.

In July 2012, Walker transferred her roles as a news anchor and a general assignment reporter to the Fox-owned WFLD in Chicago, Illinois, after moving there with her husband. In December 2013, Walker departed WFLD and moved to Atlanta, Georgia, with her husband, where she joined CNN International. From 2015 to 2020, Walker anchored a three-hour daily news program on CNN International's CNN Today with colleague Michael Holmes.

In March 2021, Walker reported on air that she had been the victim of anti-East Asian insults. In February 2022, she published an opinion piece about violence against East Asian-American women. On October 8, 2022, she was officially named co-anchor of New Day Weekend, now CNN This Morning Weekend. In February 2025, she announced she would leave CNN after more than ten years with the network. Porsche hired Walker in January 2026 as its North American vice president of public relations.

== Personal life ==
In April 2012, Walker married otolaryngologist and facial plastic surgeon Thomas Walker in Austria. Aside from her native English, she also speaks Spanish and Korean, although Walker has stated that her Korean is not proficient.

She revealed that her father is a Korean refugee who moved to the United States during the Korean War.
