= Leon Hawthorne =

British journalist and television executive (born 1966)

Leon Hawthorne (born 11 January 1966) is a British television executive, journalist and presenter. He was a World News anchor for CNN (1996–1999) and a political correspondent for the BBC in Westminster (1999) before founding The Baby Channel, the world's first parenting television network, of which he was CEO until July 2008. From 2007, Hawthorne has focussed on creating niche TV channels for the Internet, including Beauty Zone TV, Book Zone TV and Theatreland TV.

== Early life ==
Hawthorne was born in Bristol, England on 11 January 1966; and went to school in Cardiff and Oxford before going to the University of Liverpool at the age of seventeen (1983–1986) and graduating with a BA Combined Honours degree in Politics and Sociology. Whilst at university, he was Deputy Editor of the student newspaper, the Guild & City Gazette and active in student politics.

== Career ==
Hawthorne's television career started in August 1989 when he joined Thames Television as a researcher on a business and economics show, The City Programme. A year later, he joined the BBC as an Assistant Producer on Business Breakfast and Breakfast News, where he began appearing on camera as a reporter. He moved to Bristol, joining the ITV franchisee HTV West in order to work full-time as a reporter and get more on-screen experience. Here he produced short films on local current affairs and presented HTV News. He created a weekly business programme, Money Week, which he presented. Hawthorne returned to London at the launch of London Tonight for Carlton Television and London Weekend Television in January 1993. There he was a regular face reporting on London news, covering a wide range of topics including IRA terrorism, crime, business and showbiz. In 1993, Hawthorne hired a Michael Jackson lookalike for a report on the singer's alleged stay at London's Priory Clinic. Hawthorne's arrival with the fake Jackson in a limousine outside the clinic caused a stir, with hundreds of fans and TV crews mobbing the scene. In the frenzy, one radio station, LBC, reported extensively live on the "arrival" of Michael Jackson, only later to have to apologise for the mistake. In 1996, Hawthorne joined CNN as a World News Anchor, initially working from its London bureau before moving to the network's headquarters in Atlanta. His shows ran at 7.00pm, 8.00pm and 10.00pm and included coverage of the death of Princess Diana; the murder of Gianni Versace; the commando raid on the Japanese Embassy in Lima, Peru and the resulting rescue of hostages held by the Tupac Amaru Revolutionary Movement (MRTA); and a live interview with Italian Premier Romano Prodi. In 1998, US Vice President Al Gore, on a walkabout around the CNN newsroom mistook Hawthorne for one of his Secret Service agents, a fact which caused some hilarity among the assembled journalists and possible consternation for the Secret Service. Hawthorne returned to London to join the BBC as a Political Correspondent. He was a member of the "Lobby", the select group of journalists attending daily briefings at 10 Downing Street given by then Prime Minister Tony Blair's Press Secretary, Alistair Campbell. Hawthorne reported for BBC1's On The Record; Radio 4's The Westminster Hour and Today Programme; and he presented Despatch Box on BBC2.

== The Baby Channel ==
Hawthorne left the BBC to front World News for CNBC Europe in London, which gave him the time to develop a business plan for a new satellite television channel. In 2000, Rupert Murdoch's British Sky Broadcasting announced plans to give away free digital satellite boxes to anyone who wanted one, and Hawthorne recognised digital compression technology allowed for hundreds of new channels to launch on the back of Sky's distribution. Hawthorne looked at the array of niche magazines on the newsstand and zeroed in on parenting as a genre which nobody was doing on TV. The idea for the Baby Channel was born. However, the dotcom bubble burst in 2000-01 and other new niche TV channels like Channel Health and Money Channel went bust very quickly making it difficult to raise the venture capital to finance the Baby Channel. Hawthorne personally financed its launch online in 2002, on HomeChoice (now Tiscali) in June 2004 and on Virgin Media's cable TV platform in September 2005. RDF Media Plc and Simply Media TV Ltd invested in the channel to launch it on the UK (Sky) satellite TV platform on 10 October 2005 with Hawthorne as chief executive officer and a 25% shareholder. The channel's programmes included tips on pregnancy, birth, child health, parenthood, cookery, exercise and family life.

In 2006, Hawthorne became CEO of Simply Media's channels and production business, where he launched Simply TV as a satellite entertainment channel. Simply also launched a raft of niche web TV channels including Beauty Zone, Health Zone, Food Zone, Astrozone (for astrology), Avenue 11 (a music and showbiz channel) and Simply Entertainment (movie news). Hawthorne also created Borders TV, a web TV service for the UK book retailer; Boots TV for the pharmacy retailer; and all of the video channels on iVillage UK.

Hawthorne sold his stake in both Simply Media and the Baby Channel and resigned in July 2008. Now working through his own small vehicle, Videobite, Hawthorne has launched Waterstone’s TV for the book retailer and created two channels of his own, Book Zone TV and a theatre channel, Theatreland TV.
