= Monita Rajpal =

Canadian journalist

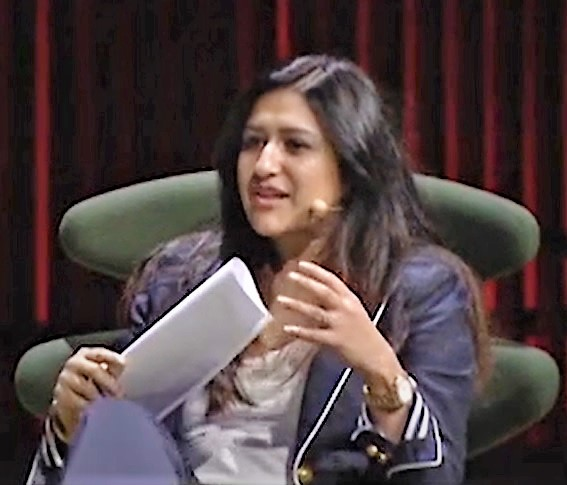
Image of Monita Rajpal at the Copenhagen Fashion Summit

Monita Rajpal (born 20 February 1974) is a Canadian journalist. She is a former news presenter for Citytv and CNN International.

At CNN, she anchored CNN Today, World One, the art programmes Art of Life and Icon, CNN NewsCenter, and TalkAsia. She worked for CNN between 2001 and 2014, first in Atlanta at the CNN Center, next in London, and finally in Hong Kong. Rajpal is now a life coach helping high achieving women to cut through the noise, make sense of pivotal life shifts, and create lives rooted in clarity, purpose, and self-trust.

== Career ==
In her second year of college, Rajpal wished to work at a part-time job, so she did a two-month contract as a switchboard operator at the CHUM-City Building. After she graduated from Ryerson Polytechnic University (now Toronto Metropolitan University) with a degree in radio and television arts in 1996, Rajpal started a six-month contract to be a receptionist at ChumCity. She responded to phone calls and led visitors on building tours. On the final day of her contract, Stephen Hurlbut, the vice president of programming, requested that she continue working for several weeks to conduct research. Rajpal became Hurlbut's assistant at CP24 as the channel was being launched in 1997. She then became a reporter and anchor for CP24 and Citytv, where she reported on stories for the "primetime nightly news" such as federal elections, teacher strikes, and homelessness in Toronto.

While situated in his Toronto hotel room in February 2001, a CNN executive was browsing through the television channels and saw Rajpal. He extended an Atlanta-based CNN International anchor position to Rajpal, who accepted and started working at CNN in 2001. She worked about 12 hours daily at the CNN Center, reading news publications like The Economist and The New Yorker. While based in Atlanta, she had interviewed Ehud Barak, a former Prime Minister of Israel; Andrés Pastrana Arango, the then-President of Colombia; and Moses Blah, who had just taken office as President of Liberia. She covered news stories about the war on terror, Catholic Church sexual abuse cases, Liberian strife, former American president Jimmy Carter's visit to Cuba, and presidential elections in France.

Rajpal moved to London in late 2004 where she anchored the European edition of CNN Today and the art programme Art of Life. In 2010, Rajpal hosted the CNN art culture programme Icon. The show's first three episodes discussed Paris fashion and art, guitarist Les Paul's legacy, and advertising. In 2011, she co-anchored World One, a daily CNN International news programme while based in London.

In late 2012, Rajpal moved from London to Hong Kong. She hosted two shows that had their first broadcasts at the beginning of 2013: CNN NewsCenter and TalkAsia. CNN NewsCenter is a news programme that discusses international headlines, while TalkAsia is a weekly programme that interviews an internationally known person for 30 minutes. Notable people she has interviewed for CNN include Mikhail Gorbachev, Vicente Fox, Al Gore, Tom Ford, and I. M. Pei. Rajpal left CNN on 4 July 2014.

== Personal life ==
Rajpal was born on 20 February 1974 in Hong Kong to "a Chinese mother of Indian origin and an Indian father". Her maternal grandfather moved from Punjab to Shanghai at 16 years old. Her mother was raised in Shanghai and became an electronics company executive. Rajpal is Sikh and has a brother. Rajpal grew up in Hong Kong and at age 14 immigrated with her family to North York in Toronto, Canada. She attended A. Y. Jackson Secondary School where she took part in its Amnesty International club. Upon seeing Rajpal present to a crowded assembly hall, the vice principal requested that she deliver the school's morning broadcasts. Her guidance counsellor, who knew about her broadcasting work, recommended that she submit a college application to the radio and television arts program at Ryerson Polytechnic University, which she attended.

Her parents had wanted her to be a physician. Her uncle worked at RTHK. Her mother listened to radio news broadcasts on the radio all day which introduced Rajpal to the news business. She is fluent in Cantonese, English, French, and Punjabi. Rajpal said her pop icons are the band U2, the architect Frank Gehry, the artist Damien Hirst, and Oprah Winfrey.

She blogs on her news and lifestyle blog, The Citrine Room.
