= Victor Blackwell =

American television news anchor

- Born: September 25, 1981 (age 44); Baltimore, Maryland, U.S.
- Education: Howard University (BA)
- Occupations: Television news anchor / reporter, journalist
- Years active: 2003–present

Victor Blackwell (born September 25, 1981) is an American television news anchor who currently co-hosts the weekend edition of CNN This Morning and hosts First of All with Victor Blackwell on CNN.

== Early life and education ==
Blackwell was class president of his high school graduating class at Milford Mill Academy in 1999. He earned a BA in Broadcast Journalism from Howard University in Washington, D.C. While in college, he worked at Howard University's public television station WHUT-TV.

== Career ==
After college, Blackwell worked as a reporter and fill-in anchor at WHAG-TV in Hagerstown, Maryland. He also worked as a reporter and weekend anchor at WTLV/WJXX in Jacksonville, Florida. Blackwell was the first black main anchor at WPBF in West Palm Beach, Florida. Blackwell joined CNN in 2012 as a correspondent, based at CNN's southeast bureau. In 2013, Blackwell's exclusive reporting on the mysterious death of Georgia teenager Kendrick Johnson led to investigations by the Office of Secretary of State of Georgia and the US Attorney for Georgia's Middle District. In January 2014, Blackwell was promoted to co-host of New Day Saturday and Sunday with Christi Paul.

On April 19, 2021, he began co-hosting a two-hour afternoon block of CNN Newsroom with Alisyn Camerota. On March 25, 2023, Blackwell returned to weekend mornings to co-anchor CNN This Morning with Amara Walker. He announced that this was a permanent assignment.

In August 2023, CNN announced a major overhaul of its weekday/weekend programming, in making that announcement Blackwell was named host of a new weekend show called First of All with Victor Blackwell. He will continue as host of CNN This Morning.

== Accolade ==
In 2009, Blackwell received a Regional Emmy Awards for Outstanding Feature Reporting. He was also nominated for a Regional Emmy in 2007, 2008, and 2011. Blackwell also received a Regional Edward R. Murrow Award for his reporting on the Stop Snitchin' phenomenon and its impact on inner-city crime. Blackwell received the Unity Award from the Radio Television Digital News Association in 2007 for his reporting on the high school graduation rate of black boys.

== Personal life ==
Blackwell came out as gay on CNN on December 21, 2013, in an on-air conversation with co-anchor Pamela Brown.
