= Richard Roth (journalist) =

American journalist, a CNN correspondent

- Born: Richard Roth; 1955 (age 70–71); New York City
- Occupation: Journalist
- Notable credit(s): Gulf War One, revolution in Prague, Romania, Berlin Wall fall, Tiananmen Square protests, Achille Lauro hijacking, American political conventions, 9-11 at World Trade Center.

Richard Roth (born 1955) is an American journalist, a CNN correspondent who covers the United Nations. He was the host of Diplomatic License (until its cancellation in January 2006), a weekly program that was devoted to United Nations affairs. Roth is a CNN "original" — one of the first employees when the network launched in 1980. He has covered a wide range of stories over the last 25 years, from the 1989 Tiananmen Square protests and massacre to the fall of the Berlin Wall and the first Gulf War.

== Biography ==
Roth was born into a Jewish family, Roth graduated from New York University with a degree in journalism. Roth lived in Whitestone, Queens, in the early 1970s. Before CNN, he was a news anchor and reporter for AP Radio and a producer for WPIX-TV in New York City.

== In popular culture ==
Richard Roth appeared in Robert Wiener’s book Live from Baghdad. He appeared as a character in the 2002 HBO film of the same name where he was portrayed by actor Hamish Linklater.

The book as well as the film features Roth’s brief involvement with Wiener’s crew in Baghdad which was caused by sudden withdrawal of his fellow reporter colleague Tom Murphy on safety issues. Roth was stationed in Amman before joining Wiener and left the crew shortly before the Gulf War began, but within this time became part of an important coverage where the CNN team stepped into a messy US diplomatic mission in Baghdad and he interviewed a stranded US expatriate worker Robert Vinton. Roth’s interview of Vinton saw widespread coverage in the US and caused subsequent disappearance of Bob Vinton by the Iraqi authorities, though he was finally released and allowed to leave Iraq for home.
