= CNN Newsroom (TV program) =

Main newscast program airing on CNN International

- Genre: News
- Presented by: Rosemary Church; Ben Hunte
- Original language: English

Production
- Production locations: Atlanta, London, New York City, Washington, D.C.
- Camera setup: Multiple-camera setup
- Running time: 30 minutes to 5 hours

Original release
- Network: CNN International
- Release: September 1985 – present

Related
- CNN Newsroom

CNN Newsroom (formerly known as World News and World Report) is the main newscast airing on CNN International. The programme is also simulcast on the domestic version of CNN - named on-air as Newsroom Live to avoid confusion with the locally based newscast - during its overnight downtime.

== Previous incarnations ==
CNN International's main newscast brand for much of the 1990s and 2000s was simply World News. The majority of bulletins were presented from CNN Center in Atlanta, although some editions came from Washington, D.C. (branded as World News from Washington). From the late 1990s onwards, there was also World News Europe, which was presented from London and ran during European primetime, and Asia Tonight which was broadcast from Hong Kong (the latter was later rebranded as World News Asia, to match the other broadcasts).

== World Report (2009–2013) ==
On September 21, 2009, CNN Today, Your World Today and World News were rebranded as World Report; the network's long-running week-in-review programme, CNN World Report (which traditionally aired on Sunday afternoons on the American network) took a new name, World View, to make way for the new branding. Initially, World Report ran multiple times per day; however, as CNN International's schedule evolved, this gradually reduced to two separate three-hour morning blocks for Asian and European audiences, as well as regular bulletins at weekends.

The Asian morning edition of World Report was rebranded as CNN Newsroom in November 2012, to coincide with the revamp of CNN's Hong Kong studio, and the introduction of a new anchor team in Andrew Stevens and Patricia Wu.

Asian edition anchor Anna Coren received the 2011 Asian Television Award for "Best News Presenter or Anchor" for her work on the programme.

== CNN Newsroom (2013–present) ==
Effective June 17, 2013, World Report and World One were renamed CNN Newsroom. The new show was branded with new graphics, and originally used the previous World Report theme music, although this was changed quickly to the World One music. In 2014, a completely new theme was introduced.

== Notable personalities ==
Programs occasionally pre-empted for special programs.

=== Current anchors ===
- Rosemary Church (Atlanta)
- Ben Hunte (Atlanta)
- Polo Sandoval (New York)
- Brian Abel (Washington, D.C.)
- Salma Abdelaziz (London)

=== Weather team ===
- Derek Van Dam
- Allison Chinchar

=== Current fill-in anchors ===
- Lynda Kinkade (Atlanta)
- Kristie Lu Stout (Hong Kong)
- Christina MacFarlane (London)
- Paula Newton (Ottawa/New York/Atlanta)
- Richard Quest (London/New York)
- Will Ripley (Hong Kong/Taipei)
- Ivan Watson (Hong Kong)

=== Former anchors ===
- Natalie Allen (Atlanta)
- Errol Barnett (Atlanta)
- Kim Brunhuber (Atlanta)
- Anna Coren (Hong Kong)
- Robyn Curnow (Atlanta)
- Max Foster (London)
- Laila Harrak (Atlanta)
- Michael Holmes (Atlanta)
- George Howell (Atlanta)
- Jonathan Mann (Atlanta)
- Bianca Nobilo (London)
- Jim Sciutto (Washington, D.C.)
- Isha Sesay (Atlanta/Los Angeles)
- Isa Soares (London)
- Rahel Solomon (New York)
- John Vause (Atlanta)
- Amara Walker (Atlanta)
- Fredricka Whitfield (Atlanta)

=== Former fill-in anchors ===
- Zain Asher
- Patricia Chew
- Pauline Chiou
- Jim Clancy
- Adrian Finighan
- Hala Gorani
- Stan Grant
- Charles Hodson
- Jonathan Mann
- Colleen McEdwards
- Monita Rajpal
- Anjali Rao
- Don Riddell
- Hugh Riminton
- Isha Sesay
- Fionnuala Sweeney
- Ralitsa Vassileva
- Hannah Vaughan Jones
- Zain Verjee
- Nick Watt
- Patricia Wu
