= Your World Today =

International news-magazine television series

- Genre: News magazine
- Presented by: · Jonathan Mann (weekdays) · Colleen McEdwards (weekdays) · Rosemary Church (weekends) · Isa Soares & Cyril Vanier(Revived edition)
- Country of origin: United States
- Original language: English

Production
- Production locations: Atlanta, Georgia
- Running time: · 60 minutes (weekdays) · 30 minutes (weekends) · 45 minutes (revived version)

Original release
- Network: CNN International

Your World Today is a former daily international news-magazine television series that aired on CNN International, a sister cable-news channel to CNN. The show served as a morning breakfast show for viewers in the Asia-Pacific region.

== Production and format ==
Your World Today initially aired for up to four hours per day. It aired every day between 10:00 a.m. and 2:00 p.m Eastern Time. However, following the creation of programmes such as The Brief, Prism and International Desk, the weekday edition was reduced to sixty minutes, while the weekend edition aired for thirty minutes. An additional edition of the program aired on Saturdays from 12:00 p.m., for thirty minutes.

Based at CNN's world headquarters in Atlanta, Georgia, the program featured reports worldwide by CNN correspondents and affiliates.

It included regular business updates from New York City and London, sports and weather updates as well as covering all the live and breaking news.

In 2019, CNNI relaunched the show with anchors Isa Soares and Cyril Vanier. The program was based in the network's London bureau. It aired from 12:00 a.m. and 2:00 a.m BST with cut-ins for World Sport and was aimed as a morning news program for viewers in the Asia-Pacific region. In the midst of the COVID-19 pandemic in 2020, the program was placed off the air and replaced with The Situation Room with Wolf Blitzer. Vanier subsequently left CNN by 2021.

=== Anchors in 2019 ===
- Isa Soares
- Cyril Vanier

=== Anchors in 2009 ===
- Jonathan Mann
- Colleen McEdwards
- Rosemary Church (Weekends)

=== Previous anchors ===
- Hala Gorani
- Zain Verjee
- Daljit Dhaliwal
- Tumi Makgabo
- Jim Clancy
- Rosemary Church (weekdays)
- Ralitsa Vassileva

=== Simulcast on CNN ===
An edition of the program in the 12:00 p.m. time slot was previously simulcast on CNN, making it one of the few shows in cable television to be broadcast in over 200 countries and territories. In September 2008, CNN Newsroom took over the program's hour timeslot on CNN.

== Replacement ==
The first iteration of the program was replaced by World Report (CNN) and International Desk as part of CNN International's relaunch in September 2009.
