= Techwood Music =

American music publishing company

Techwood Music, Inc.
- Company type: Corporation
- Industry: Music publishing
- Founded: July 14, 1988; 37 years ago
- Defunct: 2019
- Successor: WaterTower Music
- Headquarters: One CNN Center, Atlanta, Georgia, United States
- Key people: David R. Levy (CEO); Charles A. Mostella (CFO); Louise S. Sams (Secretary)
- Services: Music publishing
- Owner: Turner Broadcasting System
- Parent: WarnerMedia

Techwood Music, Inc. was established in 1988 by then Turner Broadcasting Chairman and CEO Ted Turner to manage the vast music catalogue publishing and licensing rights created by motion pictures and television series produced by Adult Swim, Cartoon Network, CNN, TBS, TNT, TruTV, Turner Sports, Techwood Studios and the now defunct WTBS-TV Channel 17 in Atlanta.

While Techwood Music owns the publishing and licensing rights to the music in its they do not own copyrights which are most likely owned by another Turner entity, the composer, a company controlled by the composer or a third party corporation.

The Techwood Music name is derived from owner Turner Broadcasting System's headquarters known as The Mansion on Techwood Drive NW in Atlanta, Georgia.
