= Hala Gorani =

American-Syrian journalist (born 1970)

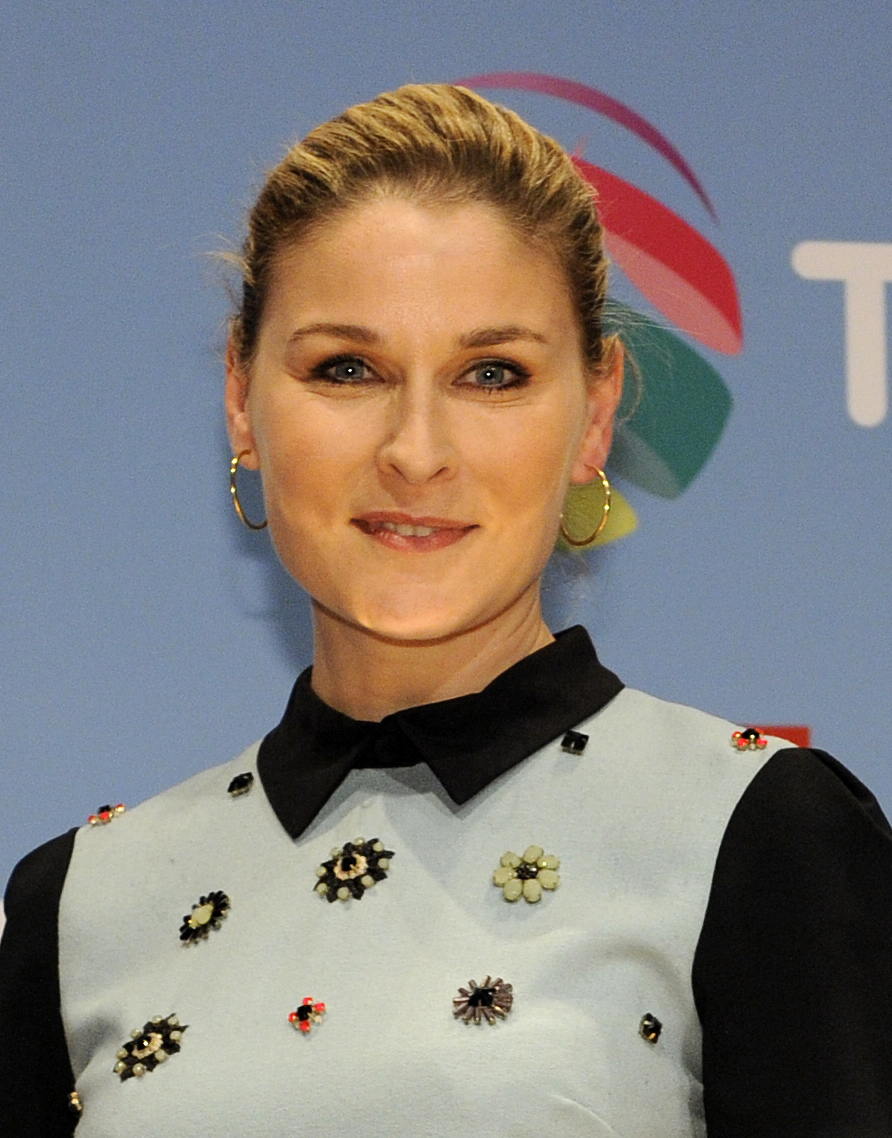
- Gorani in 2016
- Born: Hala Basha Gorani; March 1, 1970 (age 56); Seattle, Washington, U.S.
- Education: George Mason University; Sciences Po
- Occupations: Journalist; News anchor & correspondent; War correspondent
- Spouse: Christian Streib (2015–present)
- Awards: Edward R. Murrow Award, 4 Emmy Awards, George Foster Peabody Award, Television Personality of the Year 2016

Hala Basha-Gorani (/ˈhɑːlə ɡəˈrɑːni/; born March 1, 1970) is an American journalist. Previously she was a correspondent for NBC News and an anchor and correspondent for CNN International, based in London. She is also a war correspondent. She previously anchored CNN's Hala Gorani Tonight weeknights at 8 p.m. CET. Gorani co-hosted Your World Today with Jim Clancy until February 2009 and then International Desk until April 2014 from CNN's Atlanta headquarters.

In early 2022, Gorani was a special war anchor based in Lviv, in western Ukraine, during the Russian invasion. Although broadcast in the late evening to her American audience, the time difference means that she is coming live in the early morning from Ukraine.

On 28 April 2022, Gorani announced she would be leaving CNN, and would present her final episode of Hala Gorani Tonight that evening.

In August 2026 she launched her own YouTube channel called Hala Gorani Reports.

== Early life ==
Gorani was born in 1970 in Seattle, Washington. According to her, she comes from "quite an international background. ... I'm a U.S. citizen with Syrian and French parents." Her parents emigrated from Aleppo, Syria in 1966. She has an older brother. Her father first worked as an engineer in Seattle where Gorani was born and then moved to St. Louis for three years and thereafter to Algeria when Gorani was 4 years old. They lived for two years in Algeria until her parents divorced and Gorani at the age of six moved to Paris with her mother while her father moved to Washington D.C.

Gorani was mainly raised in Paris, France. Her name originates from hāla (هالة), a common Arabic name meaning "halo (around the moon)." She earned a Bachelor of Science in economics from George Mason University in Fairfax, Virginia, near Washington, D.C., and wrote for the Fourth Estate student newspaper (then known as the Broadside). She also graduated from the Institut d'études politiques (better known as Sciences Po) in Paris in 1995. Due to her multi-national experiences during her formative years, the sound of her name, and her accent, Gorani says that she is a foreigner wherever she goes.

== Career ==
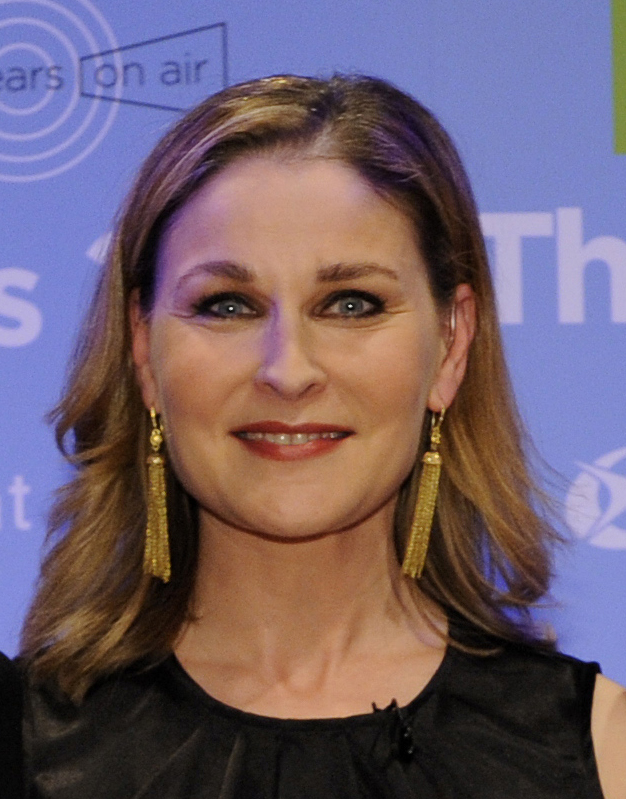
Hala Gorani Association of International Broadcasting (AIB)

Gorani began her career as a reporter for La Voix du Nord and Agence France-Presse before joining France 3 in 1994. After a stint at Bloomberg Television in London, she joined CNN in 1998 as an anchor for CNN International's European breakfast show CNN Today. She has since reported from every country in the Middle East. In November 2005, Gorani was one of the first television reporters on the ground in Amman, Jordan after Al Qaeda suicide bombers attacked two hotels. Earlier in 2005, she covered Israel's unilateral disengagement plan from Gaza. In the summer of 2006, she covered the 2006 Lebanon War from Lebanon, which earned CNN an Edward R. Murrow Award. In 2002 and in 2007, she led CNN's coverage of the respective French presidential elections.

Gorani was one of the CNN journalists awarded a News and Documentary Emmy for the network's coverage of the 2011 Egyptian revolution that led to the ouster of the country's then president, Hosni Mubarak. In 2015, she covered from Paris the January Charlie Hebdo shooting and the November ISIS attacks.

Gorani also covered the devastating 2010 Haiti earthquake, for which CNN's coverage was recognized with a Golden Nymph award, one of the highest honors in international journalism, at the Monte-Carlo Television Festival that year. In addition to her anchoring duties, Gorani often goes into the field to report on major breaking news stories. In late June, she was part of a small team of journalists allowed into Syria for the first time since the protests began to cover the situation there. She previously reported extensively from Jordan and Egypt, and her coverage of the Arab Spring helped CNN win a Peabody Award in 2012.

In 2008, Gorani attended the World Economic Forum in Davos, Switzerland, and she moderated the closing session that featured several business and political leaders, including Tony Blair, Nobel Peace Prize Laureate Elie Wiesel and JP Morgan Chase & Co. Chairman and CEO James Dimon.

Gorani formerly hosted Inside the Middle East on CNN International, the monthly show featuring stories on the most important social, political and cultural issues in the region. During her five years as host, she reported on several colorful and thought-provoking stories including poverty in oil-rich Bahrain; everyday struggles for artists living in Iraq; and gay life in the Middle East, which was a first on international television and earned a nomination for a Gay & Lesbian Alliance Against Defamation (GLAAD) award.

Gorani has interviewed Jimmy Carter, Tony Blair, Amr Moussa, Rafik Hariri, Saeb Erakat, Nouri al-Maliki, Ehud Barak, the Dalai Lama, Shimon Peres and Carla Bruni, among others. Gorani avoids discussing her political and religious views, citing the need for professional neutrality.

In May 2015, Gorani was awarded an honorary doctorate by George Mason University and delivered the commencement address to that year's graduating students.

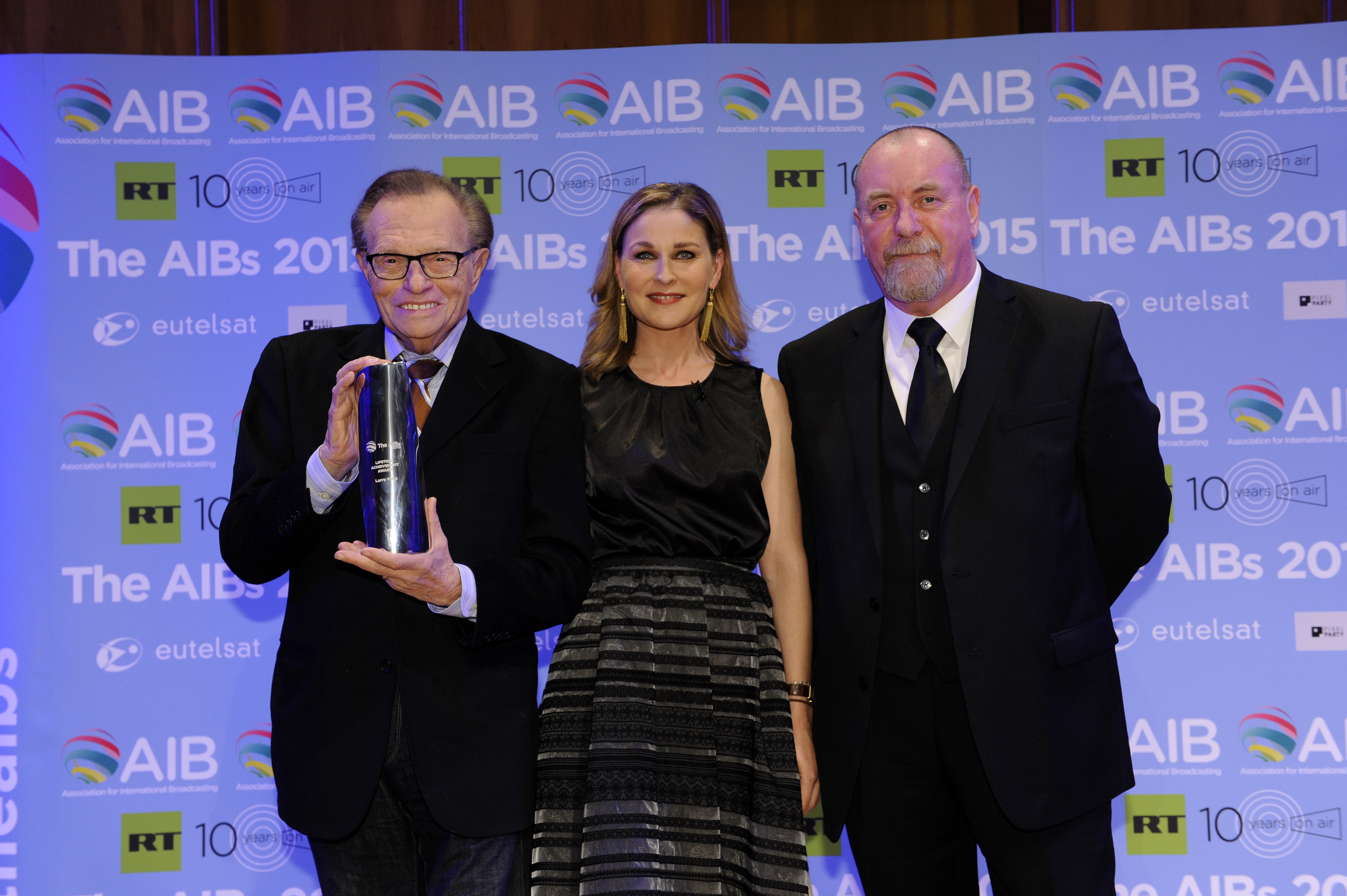
Hala Gorani Association of International Broadcasting group

On the weekend of November 13–15, 2015, Gorani was a principal member of the extensive CNN team that covered the action, aftermath and investigation of terrorist attacks in Paris, France where some 130 people were killed.

In 2018, Gorani was nominated for another News and Documentary Emmy for Outstanding Breaking News Coverage, Manchester Concert Attack. That same year, she and her team received an Emmy Award for her show's coverage of "Syria: Gasping for Life in Khan Sheikhoun."

In a commencement address, Gorani offered these observations to the new graduates: Gorani says that as a journalist, career defining moments are those where one can identify that the work did make a difference; and the being different is a good thing because those differences will make a person memorable. Gorani advised the students to cultivate their differences and from them the students will find their strength.

From November 2017 to April 2022, Gorani anchored CNN International's Hala Gorani Tonight weeknights at 8 p.m. CET. From February 2022 Gorani was a special war anchor based in Lviv, in western Ukraine during the Russian invasion.

Having left CNN, after her final show on 28 April 2022, Gorani took a sabbatical from broadcasting to work on her first book, a memoir exploring the subject of identity which was published by Hachette Book Group in February 2024 and titled But You Don't Look Arab: And Other Tales of Unbelonging.

== Personal life ==
Gorani considers Paris her home, which is also where her mother resides. From 2004 to 2014, she was based at the CNN Center in Atlanta, Georgia, and in 2014 she moved back to London.

French novelist Yann Moix dedicated his first novel, Jubilations Vers le Ciel, to her in 1996.

Gorani married German CNN photojournalist Christian Streib on June 14, 2015, in Jardin Majorelle, Morocco.

While researching her book, Gorani traced part of her familial ancestry to Abkhazia.

== Bibliography ==
- Gorani, Hala (2024). But You Don't Look Arab: And Other Tales of Unbelonging. Hachette Books. ISBN 0306831643

== Awards and recognition ==
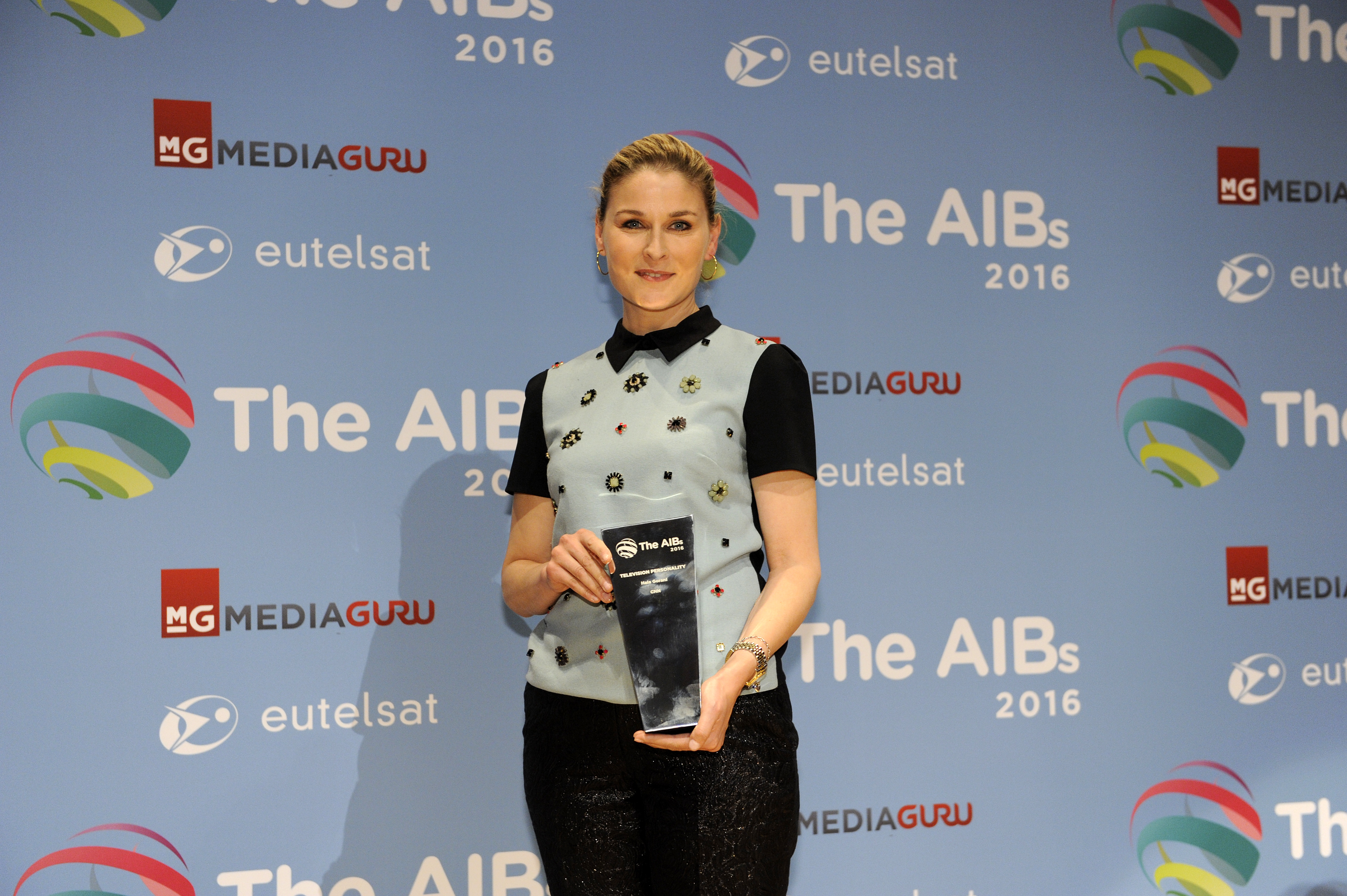
Gorani received the Television Personality of the Year award in 2016.

- 2023: DuPont-Columbia Award for CNN's coverage of the Russian invasion of Ukraine.
- 2018: News and Documentary Emmy win for "Syria: Gasping for Life in Khan Sheikhoun."
- 2018: News and Documentary Emmy nomination for Outstanding Breaking News Coverage, Manchester Concert Attack.
- 2016: Television Personality of the Year, Association for International Broadcasting.
- 2015: Honorary Doctor of Humane Letters degree, George Mason University.
- 2015: Named one of the most powerful women by Forbes Woman Middle East.
- 2012: News and Documentary Emmy win for coverage of the Egyptian revolution.
- 2012: News and Documentary Emmy nomination for Outstanding Live Coverage of a Current News Story – Long Form (Anderson Cooper 360).
- 2012: George Foster Peabody Award for the network's coverage of the Arab Spring.
- 2011–2015: Named among 100 Most powerful Arab women by Arabian Business Magazine.
- 2007: Edward R. Murrow Award for the network's coverage of the continuing coverage of the Middle East conflict.
