= Paula Newton =

Canadian TV journalist

- Born: 1968 (age 57–58); Hamilton, Ontario
- Occupation: Journalist

Paula Newton (born 1968 in Hamilton, Ontario) is an international correspondent with CNN and CNN International based in Ottawa covering stories in Canada since 2007. Newton is a former reporter for Canadian network CTV from 1993 to 2005. At CTV, Newton worked at various positions including:

- Atlantic affairs reporter in Halifax, Nova Scotia
- Quebec affairs correspondent in Montreal, Quebec
- National affairs correspondent, Ottawa, Ontario
- Moscow bureau chief
- Anchor on Canada AM
- Anchor on Question Period
- Anchor on CTV Newsnet

Before CTV, Newton worked as:

- parliamentary producer for Independent Satellite News 1986–1989, Ottawa, Ontario
- anchor and reporter for CHCH-TV 1989–1991, Hamilton, Ontario
- reporter for the Atlantic Television System 1991–1993, Halifax, Nova Scotia

She has also started filling in for anchors in London. She has been seen doing such shows as CNN Today, Inside the Middle East, Quest Means Business, The Brief, CNN Business Traveller and World News Europe.

She often fills in for Kim Brunhuber on CNN Newsroom's European breakfast edition.
