= Fourth Estate (George Mason University newspaper) =

Student newspaper of George Mason University, Virginia

- Type: Student newspaper
- Format: Broadsheet and Online Newspaper
- Publisher: George Mason University
- Founded: 1963
- Language: English
- Headquarters: The Hub (SUB 2) Rm 1201, Mailstop 2C5, 10423 Rivanna River Way, Fairfax, Virginia 22030
- Website: Fourth Estate (2013-present): gmufourthestate.com Broadside (1969-2013): broadsideonline.com The Gunston Ledger (1963-1969)

The Fourth Estate, sometimes stylized as the IV Estate or IV, is the student newspaper of George Mason University in Fairfax County, Virginia with an independent City of Fairfax, Virginia postal address.

The newspaper was previously called The Gunston Ledger from 1963 to 1969 and the Broadside from 1969 until 2013 when it merged with the website Connect2Mason to form the new student run newspaper, the Fourth Estate. The newspaper is a division of GMU Student Media alongside WGMU Radio. The Fourth Estate's audience and subject matter consists of issues related to faculty, staff, students, alumni, and other affiliates of George Mason University, Northern Virginia Community College, and the broader Northern Virginia sub-region of the Washington, D.C. Metropolitan Area.

== History ==
Fourth Estate, formerly known as the Broadside is George Mason University's official student newspaper, it began its life as The Gunston Ledger in 1963. The Gunston Ledger, whose first issue appeared on the then George Mason College campus located in Bailey's Crossroads, Virginia on October 15, 1963, was an eight-page monthly printed on 12 inch by 9 inch paper. Its staff of twelve students included a photograph editor, Richard Sparks, who contributed two to four photos to each issue. The content consisted of campus news, features on GMC faculty and students, engagement and wedding notices, and some commentary.

The Ledger became Broadside on October 28, 1969. It was noted in that issue that the name change was part of an effort to remake the paper into more of a news instrument like the early publications of the nation's revolutionary fathers. Broadside was a weekly paper which contained sixteen or more pages in each issue. Photography in Broadside was mostly limited to campus events and personalities.

Broadside began printing in a broadsheet format in 1982 (12-inch by 24-inch), but moved to a tabloid format in 1986 (printed on 12 inch by 12 inch paper). Broadside changed sizes again in fall 1992 when it began being produced in a new tabloid format (11 inch by 17 inch). It would continue to be funded by tax payer dollars and ad revenues. During that same year the newspaper began publishing twice a week on Mondays and Thursdays. The newspaper again underwent a change in format in fall 2000 when it switched back to a broadsheet (printed on 11.5-inch by 22-inch paper). Broadside remained a twice weekly publication until fall 2004 when it returned to a weekly publication. Broadside also began publishing its news on the internet in the Fall of 1996.

Throughout the decades Broadside's masthead has undergone several transformations. Several designed mastheads have lasted several years, but the latest and perhaps longest tenured masthead in the 2000s was created by production editor Clayton Tompkins in 2000. The green and gold masthead, that consisted of the name Broadside in gold with a green stripe with the word's "George Mason University's Student Newspaper" typed in white and a green outline of the university's Johnson Center in a rising gold sun, was the longest tenured masthead in the publications history. It was used for nine consecutive semesters from fall 2000 through fall 2004.

The content of the publication was news that was local, national, and international in scope with campus news taking the a majority of print space. Articles were presented in four different sections; news, style, opinion and sports. In Spring 2007, the paper underwent some large and noticeable changes; the online version of the newspaper was redesigned after years of neglect. A new service entitled "Exchange" launched online to serve the community and was often compared to Craigslist. New sections were also added; Business/Science/Technology and Healthy Living. However, these new sections did not last long. The print paper itself went through a major redesign, a move which was widely welcomed by the community. There were more than 70 students and staff members involved in its production.

=== Merger ===
The Broadside website has not been updated since 2013, and is, for all intents and purposes, defunct. In 2014, Broadside merged with Connect2Mason to form GMU Fourth Estate. All articles are now published to the Fourth Estate website and appear in the retitled Fourth Estate Weekly. New articles starting from 2013, are now published in both print and online formats under the name Fourth Estate.

== Awards ==
Broadside won several national awards throughout its history. In 2000 its website won an Associated Collegiate Press "Honorable Mention Award" and in spring 2002, student photographer David Manning won the Associated Collegiate Press "Photograph of the Year Award" for his shot of the World Bank protests in Washington, D.C. In 2001 Broadside was named by the Princeton Review as the ninth best student newspaper in the non-daily category.

== Fourth Estate Alumni ==
Many Gunston Ledger, Broadside and Fourth Estate alumni have gone on to careers in the mass media. One such alumna is CNN reporter Hala Gorani. The GMU economics graduate (1988-1992) penned her first article for the paper on the advantages of an ethnically diverse learning environment. She served as co-anchor on Your World Today before moving to current her role; anchoring CNN's International Desk, an hour-long news show on CNN International.
