= The World of Sid and Marty Krofft =

1976 American theme park

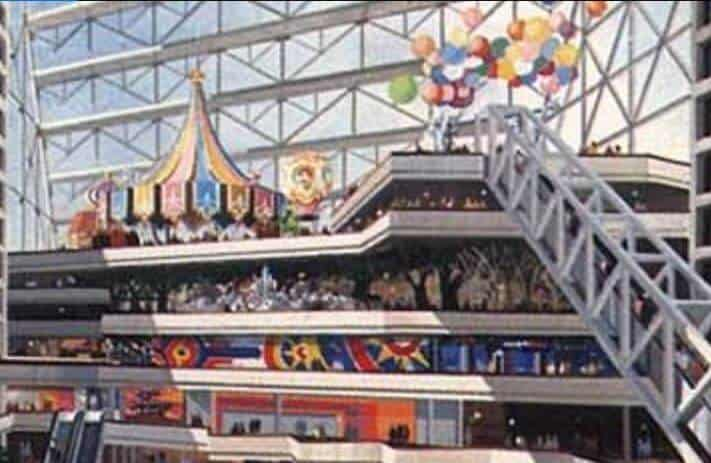
- Interactive map of The World of Sid and Marty Krofft
- Location: Omni Coliseum, Atlanta, Georgia, United States
- Coordinates: 33°45′29″N 84°23′40″W
- Opened: May 26, 1976
- Closed: 1976
- Owner: Sid and Marty Krofft

The World of Sid and Marty Krofft was an entirely indoor amusement park in Atlanta, Georgia. It was based on the various television shows produced by the sibling duo Sid and Marty Krofft, but open for less than a year in 1976.

== History ==
The park was built in the Omni International Complex, now The Center and formerly the CNN Center, opening with great fanfare on May 26, 1976, and was featured prominently at the host segments during the first season of the Saturday morning program Krofft Supershow.

While launched with much hoopla in the national press, and incorporating quality performances and entertainment options (many of the performers came from Los Angeles to perform in the park during its run), it suffered from poor attendance, never seeing more than 300,000 visitors, and was closed after six months, on November 10. The Kroffts partially blamed the park's failure on the fact that, at the time, downtown Atlanta was experiencing urban decay and close to major housing projects and generally was not considered a safe place for a family outing. Others noted that the park was "overpriced," especially when compared to the much larger Six Flags Over Georgia. Dr. Dana White, professor of Urban Studies at Emory University in Atlanta, remarked, "People were thinking of it as a full-day, family experience but it only took a couple hours. It wasn’t worth the money or the drive."

When the park closed, many of the other shops and venues went through a similar transition. The park's area remained largely vacant; a dinner theater operated for a short period on one of the lower levels, but eventually closed.

== Features ==
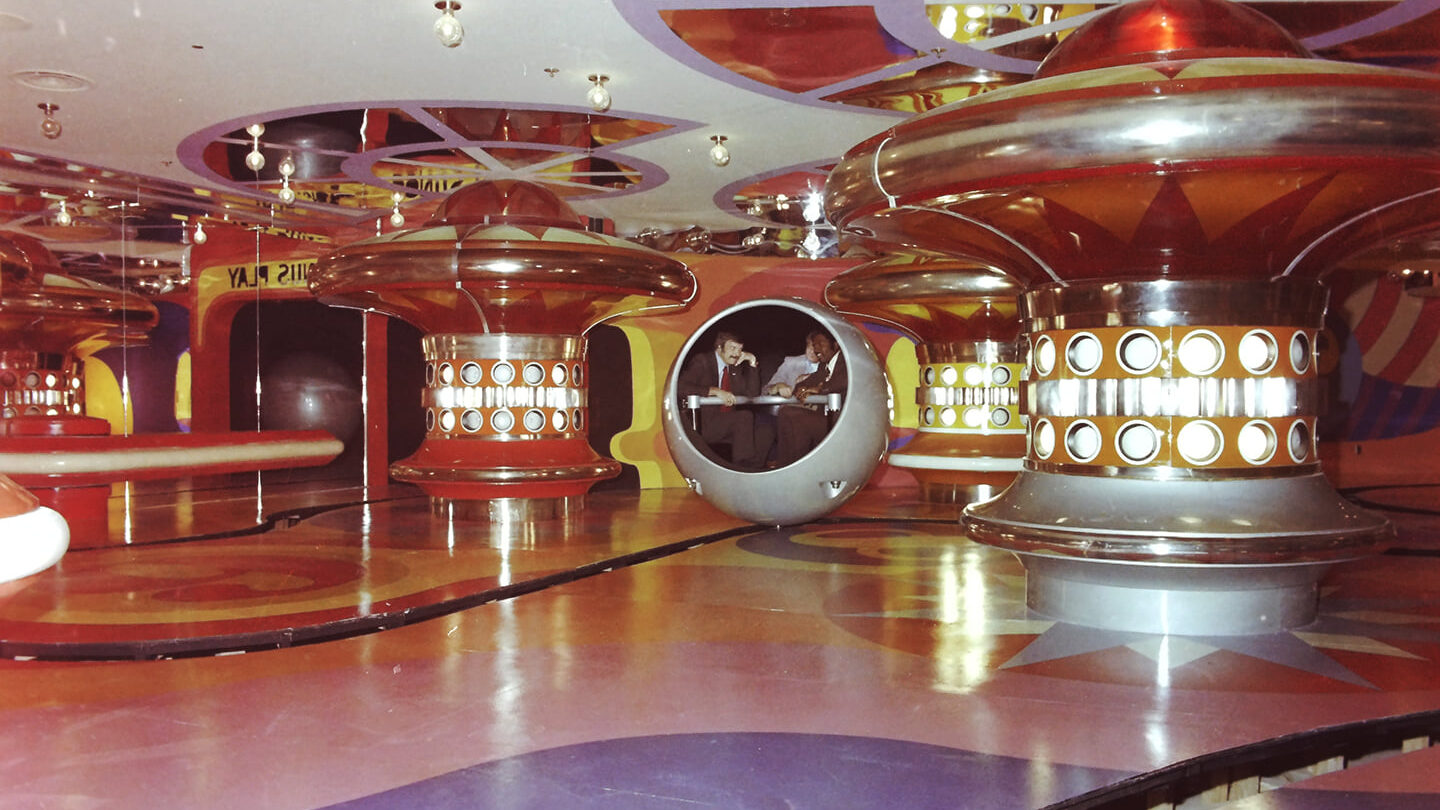
The World of Syd and Marty Krofft Interior

In keeping with the colorful and creative nature of its namesakes, the park featured elaborate attractions. There was a large carousel adorned with mythological creatures of crystal; and a giant pinball machine-themed dark ride where riders sat inside large ball-shaped pods and ricocheted through the "machine." Visitors received a "ticket booklet" with four tickets, one for each area. Most started at the top floor by riding the world's longest freestanding escalator, working their way down through the park's four areas. Tranquility Terrace occupied the top 3 levels out of 6, followed by Uptown on the next lowest level, Lidsville on the next, and Living Island Adventure on the bottom level.

Visitors entered the park at its uppermost level via a multi-story escalator, listed in the Guinness World Records as the longest freestanding (supported only at its ends) escalator in the world. Below the reception level was the first carnival level, presided over by a stilt-walking master of ceremonies, and featuring three circus trailers, each featuring a performer in costume who did a 2- to 3-minute show to a different narrator/performer's voice. The middle trailer featured Betty Broadbent, a purple belly-dancing rhino voiced by Ruth Buzzi.

The next floor was a transition level and included a caricature artist and an overlook for the stage show below. The next floor featured a live performance stage and a number of different shops and artisans. Shows included a slackrope walker; a trio of locking-style street dancers from the streets of South Central Los Angeles known as 33 RPM—James "Skeeter Rabbit" Higgins, Mike "Peek-a-Boo" Frenke and John "Okie Doke" Wilso; and a song-and-dance show starting Patty Maloney and 33 RPM. Events throughout the park featured other "little people", including Debbie Dixon (who later appeared in Star Wars), and twin brothers John and Greg Rice of Lake Worth, Florida, who were listed in the Guinness Book of World Records as the 'World's Shortest Living Twins' until John's death in 2005. A gift shop, food emporium and a glass blower/shop run by Lee Mabes completed this level.

The lower level featured a forest theme, with a theater with a live-action Krofft character show and a crafts stall with a leather artisan. The park's floors were largely open to the main atrium of the Omni. The Omni's ground level also featured a skating rink.

== Subsequent use ==
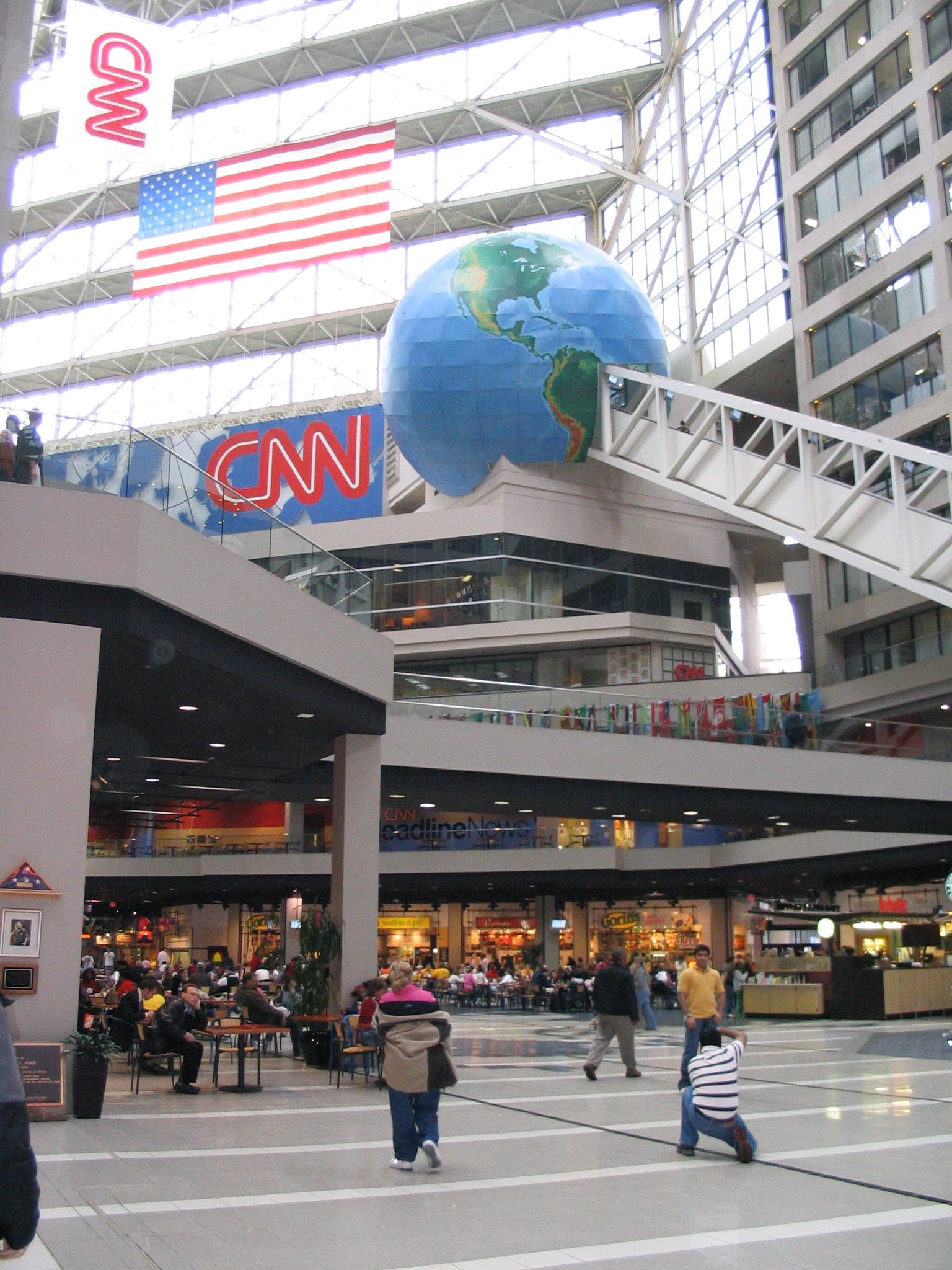
The CNN Center (formerly the Omni complex) as it appeared in 2006

After the park closed, the Omni complex went through a number of renovations, but continued to have trouble attracting tenants until the mid-1980s. At that point, Ted Turner decided that his CNN cable network had outgrown its sparse headquarters at Atlanta's old Progressive Club building. When scouting a new location, he discovered that the old Krofft park section of the Omni was largely unchanged, sporting enormous rooms and hallways that were ideal for television studios and newsrooms. CNN moved into the building in 1987. Turner soon bought the entire complex and renamed it CNN Center. Several features and aspects of the Krofft park remain, such as the massive escalator, which is now part of the CNN Tour. The facility also features an Omni Hotel (which has been there since the Center was built), meeting space, restaurants, and gift shops. It is directly adjacent to State Farm Arena, which is no longer considered part of CNN Center.
