= Hillcrest School (Nairobi, Kenya) =

Location
- Karen, Nairobi; Kenya
- Coordinates: 1°20′19″S 36°44′32″E

Information
- Other names: Hillcrest International Schools; Hillcrest Early Years; Hillcrest Preparatory School; Hillcrest Secondary School
- Type: British private international day and boarding school
- Established: 1965; 60 years ago
- Founders: Dorothy Noad; Frank Thompson
- Grades: Pre-school, K-12
- Campus size: 14 hectares (35 acres)
- Campus type: Urban
- Website: www.hillcrest.ac.ke

Hillcrest School, also known as Hillcrest International Schools, is a British private international day and boarding school located in Nairobi, Kenya. Established in 1965 as a pre-school, the school has grown to now encompass Hillcrest Early Years (HEY), Hillcrest Preparatory School and Hillcrest Secondary School.

== History ==
The origins of Hillcrest International Schools started with Hillcrest Preparatory School which was founded in 1965 by educationalist Dorothy Noad and long-serving government employee Frank Thompson. Hillcrest Preparatory secured its international school status in 1972, when it became a member of the Independent Association of Prep Schools; joining a conglomerate of British curriculum schools across the world. In 1975 Kenneth Matiba, Stephen Smith, and Frank Thompson partnered to start the Hillcrest Secondary School.

== Campus ==
It is situated on a 14-hectare (35-acre) site in the Nairobi suburb of Karen. The school is composed of 2 plots on either side of Hillcrest Road. The Western plot serves the secondary school and the Eastern plot serves both Hillcrest Early Years and the preparatory school.

Facilities are shared between the schools, and bus routes serve students from both schools.

The school caters for international, professional, and local business communities.

=== Hillcrest Early Years ===
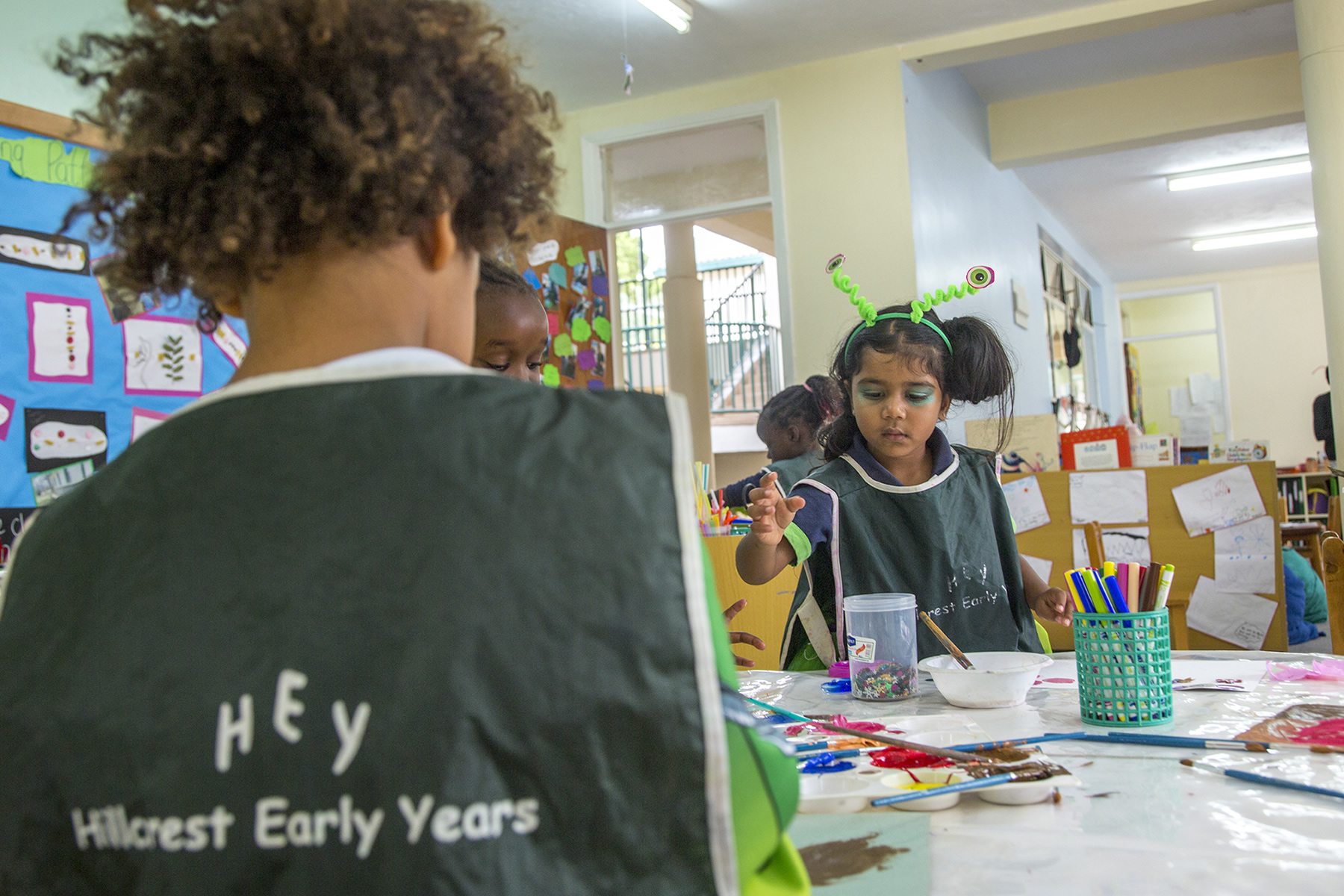
Hillcrest Early Years (HEY)

The school has; Nursery 1 (18 months – 3 years), Nursery 2 (3 – 4 years), Reception (4 – 5 years) and Year 1 (5 – 6 years).

==== Hillcrest Preparatory School ====
The preparatory school's facilities include 32 general classrooms, two laboratories, a library, two art rooms, a multipurpose hall, a swimming pool, a music centre with four practice rooms and a teaching/rehearsal space, an open-air amphitheatre, two computer laboratories, and a learning-support Center, Design and Technology center and an art room.

=== Hillcrest Secondary School ===
The secondary and preparatory school share facilities such as a twenty five metre pool, shared basketball and netball courts, and two squash courts.

The sixth form has 50 to 60 students in each year, most of whom continue to university, mainly in the UK, but also in the United States, Canada, Europe and South Africa.

=== Boarding ===
There is also a boarding house, Toad Hall, which sits on the school site, capable of housing 16 girls and 16 boys.

== Academics ==
The school year runs from September to July and IGCSE/'O' and 'A' level exams are set and marked by CIE (Cambridge International Examinations), AQA and Edexcel. The school has also recently introduced BTEC programmes in Performing arts, Sports, Business, Travel & Tourism and Art & Design (Photography).

The school, of about 440 students, has its largest groups coming from Kenya and Britain. The staff are recruited from Britain and Kenya.

== Notable alumni ==
- Jo Theones, a DJ at Fox FM in Oxford
- Zain Verjee, anchor woman at CNN international
- Paul Wekesa, former ATP Top 100 Tennis Player
