= Robyn Curnow =

South African journalist and news anchor

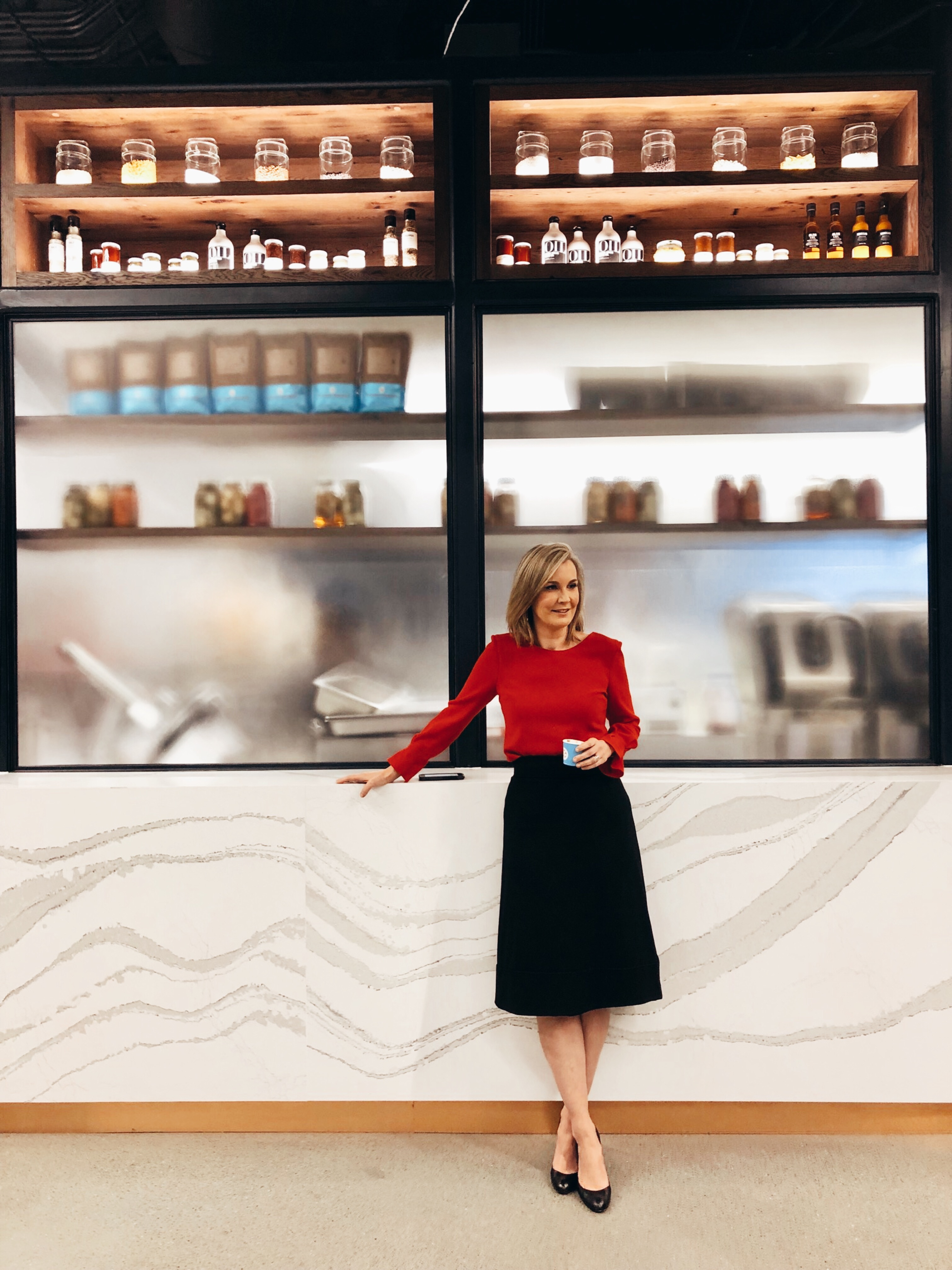
- Born: Australia
- Citizenship: South African
- Education: Magdalene College, Cambridge (M.Phil International Relations)
- Occupation: journalist
- Notable credit: CNN International Desk CNN Newsroom
- Website: https://www.searchingforamericapod.com/ https://www.robyncurnow.net/

Robyn Curnow is a South African journalist, broadcaster, and author. She was an anchor and foreign correspondent for CNN International and CNN USA.

She hosted CNN's Newsroom with Robyn Curnow from 2020 to 2022 from the CNN Center in Atlanta, Georgia. Previously, she anchored The International Desk with Robyn Curnow from 2014 to 2019. The program was a fast-moving news show that showcased CNN's global reach by going live to CNN's reporters around the world, tracking the day-by-day developments and global news for CNN's international viewers.

Before moving to the USA, Curnow was CNN's Africa correspondent based in Johannesburg, South Africa, from 2006 to 2014. She was based at CNN's London Bureau as a correspondent and anchor from 2002 to 2006.

After more than 20 years on-air at CNN, on 3 May 2022, Curnow announced she would be leaving CNN.

Curnow launched a podcast "Searching for America " which aims to decode America from an Outsider's point of view. Curnow is based in Atlanta, Georgia. Her first guests have been Mark Hertling, Jason Kander, Leyla Santiago, Kevin Sullivan, Josh Clark as well as many more Americans talking about why there is division and what can be done to fix it.

Curnow is represented by talent agency CAA.

== Early life ==
Curnow was born in Perth, Australia, and raised in Johannesburg, South Africa. She attended St Katharine's and St Mary's School for Girls in Johannesburg. Curnow has been vocal about her dyslexia, which led to her struggling at school.

Curnow attended the University of Natal, Pietermaritzburg, for her English and political science undergraduate studies. Later, while working as a reporter at the South African Broadcasting Corporation, she completed an honours degree in political studies at the University of Witwatersrand. In her late twenties, she won a Chevening Scholarship to study for a master's degree (MPhil) in international relations at Cambridge University. She was based at Magdalene College.

Curnow is the granddaughter of South African cricketer Syd Curnow who played against Australian batsman Donald Bradman in the 1930/31 test matches in Australia. Curnow's father and brother played competitive cricket too which led her life-long love of the sport.

Her maternal grandparents, Robert and Margaret Oxley, were immigrants to South Africa from Warrington, England, after World War II. Robert was a Japanese Prisoner of War who helped build the Burma Railroad. Margaret Oxley celebrated her 100th birthday in April 2024.

== Career ==
Curnow began her career at the South African Broadcasting Corporation in 1996 as a reporter for the national nightly news bulletin. She was part of a group of young reporters reporting on South Africa's new democracy and the Presidency of Nelson Mandela.

Curnow left the SABC in 2000 to study for her master's degree at Cambridge University. During that year, she freelanced for the BBC, working as a reporter for BBC Look East.

Curnow started reporting for CNN in 2001 in London, covering the UK and Europe. She reported on the death of Pope John Paul II from the Vatican, the London bombings, the royal family, the South Asian tsunami, and anchored coverage of the war in Iraq.

In 2006, she moved to Johannesburg, South Africa, to work as CNN's Africa correspondent with her husband, Kim Norgaard, CNN's Africa bureau chief.

She traveled extensively across Africa and reported on the HIV/AIDS epidemic, the 2010 FIFA World Cup, Mohammad Gaddafi at the African Union in Ethiopia, the rise of Boko Haram in Nigeria, and political upheaval in Zimbabwe. Robyn first reported from Zimbabwe during the land invasions of 2000 while at the SABC. In May 2011, she and the CNN team were detained in Harare and banned from entering the country.

Between 2007 and 2014, Curnow moderated numerous panels at the World Economic Forum in Africa, which featured South African president Jacob Zuma, Rwandan President Paul Kagame, Gabonese president Ali Bongo, the IMF's Christine Lagarde, and other African and business leaders.

Curnow was the founding host of CNN's Marketplace Africa (2010), a weekly show that featured interviews and stories with Africa's most successful businesspeople. In 2013, Curnow interviewed former U.S. president George W. Bush and his wife, Laura, when they visited Zambia on a charity trip after his presidency. During the interview, President Bush called Edward Snowden a traitor.

Curnow had an extensive sit-down interview in Botswana with former first lady Michelle Obama during her official visit to Africa. She also interviewed Oprah Winfrey at her girls' school outside Johannesburg. Curnow first knew Archbishop Desmond Tutu as a schoolgirl when he would preach in her school chapel at St Mary's School for Girls in the 1980s. Later, she would interview him in Soweto, London, Cape Town, and Johannesburg. In their last conversation, she reported on his criticisms of the ruling ANC party in South Africa.

Curnow was given special access to the 80th birthday celebrations of Archbishop Tutu for an hour-long documentary on the Nobel Peace Prize Laureate. She named him the person she considered a hero in a CNN special report.

Curnow interviewed former U.S. president Bill Clinton in Qunu, South Africa, during his visit with First Lady Hillary Clinton to Nelson Mandela's rural home. In 2013, Curnow led CNN's exclusive coverage of Nelson Mandela's ill health and death and reported live from his funeral. Curnow had a long association with Mandela and his family, interviewing him many times during and after his presidency. Her conversation with him on his 90th birthday was part of the last interview he gave.

In 2008, Curnow reported on double-amputee athlete Oscar Pistorius and followed his career until the London Olympics 2012. After Pistorius shot dead his girlfriend Reeva Steenkamp, Curnow was the face of CNN's coverage at the murder trial throughout 2014. Her live reporting and documentary on Anderson Cooper 360 featured exclusive footage and interviews with Pistorius, his family, and his inner circle. Curnow had two children while she was CNN's Africa correspondent. She has been vocal about being a working mother and balancing breaking news coverage with babies and children.

Curnow moved to Atlanta, Georgia with her family in 2014 to host the International Desk with Robyn Curnow on CNN International.

Curnow led CNN's coverage of several terror attacks in 2015 and 2016, including the attacks in Tunisia, Ivory Coast, Egypt, and the aftermath of the Paris and Nice attacks. Curnow's shows charted the rise and fall of ISIS and the Syrian war.

Curnow was on air when coalition forces launched the Mosul offensive in Iraq in October 2016, which earned her and the CNN teams on the ground a News and Documentary Emmy nomination.

Curnow first reported live from Havana, Cuba, during former U.S. president Barack Obama's historic visit in 2016. Later, she returned to Cuba to anchor CNN's coverage of Fidel Castro's death from Havana.

In 2018, Curnow received an Emmy nomination with CNN colleagues for an airstrike on a school bus in Yemen that killed dozens of children.

In 2019, Curnow won the Royal Television Society Award for Best Breaking News Coverage for the end of President Robert Mugabe's rule in Zimbabwe with CNN's team in Harare.The coverage was described by judges as a “journalistic and technical triumph that caught the excitement of the moment but kept a cool head.”

Curnow has charted the rise of Xi Jinping, Chinese ambitions, and Taiwan. Additionally, she reported extensively on Russian belligerence in Europe, hosting many discussions on Putin, NATO, the Skripal poisonings, and the Wagner group.

Curnow anchored CNN International's coverage of the 2016 election and extensively covered former U.S. president Trump's presidency and administration – tracking the geopolitical and diplomatic implications for a global audience – and issues affecting Americans, such as maternal mortality, race, and immigration. Curnow broke the news President Trump had COVID on CNN USA and CNN International.

In 2020, during COVID-19, Curnow anchored live from CNN Center in Atlanta for both CNN USA and CNN International. She was on air throughout the pandemic, interviewing frontline medical workers, scientists, and other health experts.

Curnow was part of the CNN team that won a duPont-Columbia award for CNN's coverage of the death of Jamal Khashoggi.

Curnow covered the 2020 US elections and the presidency of Joe Biden. She was on air during the Afghanistan withdrawal and its aftermath.

Throughout 2020 and 2021, she fronted live coverage of the coup in Myanmar, the explosion in Beirut, and wildfires in Sydney and California. She earned another Emmy nomination for CNN's coverage of China's repressive measures toward the Uyghurs.

In addition to her broadcasting career, Curnow has written for the Washington Post, Vogue, Cosmopolitan, Marie Clare, and the now-defunct International Herald Tribune. Curnow has written about her daughter and father's speech stutters in the Washington Post.

She is represented by CAA for publishing and TV/movie rights.

== Philanthropy ==
Curnow is an ambassador for the British charity Made by Dyslexia, and has hosted hosts global events at Lincoln Centre in New York, the Swedish Royal Palace in Stockholm, and the Science Museum in London.

== Personal life ==
Curnow currently lives in Atlanta, Georgia, with her family. She is married to Kim Nørgaard. He is the executive director of CNNI Newsgathering and Security Operations. Norgaard ran CNN's coverage of the Russian invasion of Ukraine from Lviv and Kyiv in 2022 and 2023. After the October 7 terror attacks in Israel, he also run CNN's coverage of the Gaza war from Tel Aviv and Jerusalem. They have two daughters, Freya and Hella.

Curnow and her youngest daughter are dyslexic. She was recently appointed to the Board of the Schenck School in Atlanta.

== Award and Recognition ==
- 2020 duPont-Columbia Award for The Disappearance of Jamal Khashoggi
- 2020 News and Documentary Emmy nomination for Outstanding Investigative Report in a Newscast for Fear and Oppression in Xinjiang
- 2019 Royal Television Society Award for Breaking News on the Fall of Mugabe
- 2018 News and Documentary Emmy nomination for Outstanding Breaking News Coverage for the Yemen Bus Bombing
- 2018 News and Documentary Emmy nomination for Outstanding Breaking News Coverage for The Battle of Mosul
