= Zain Verjee =

Canadian television presenter

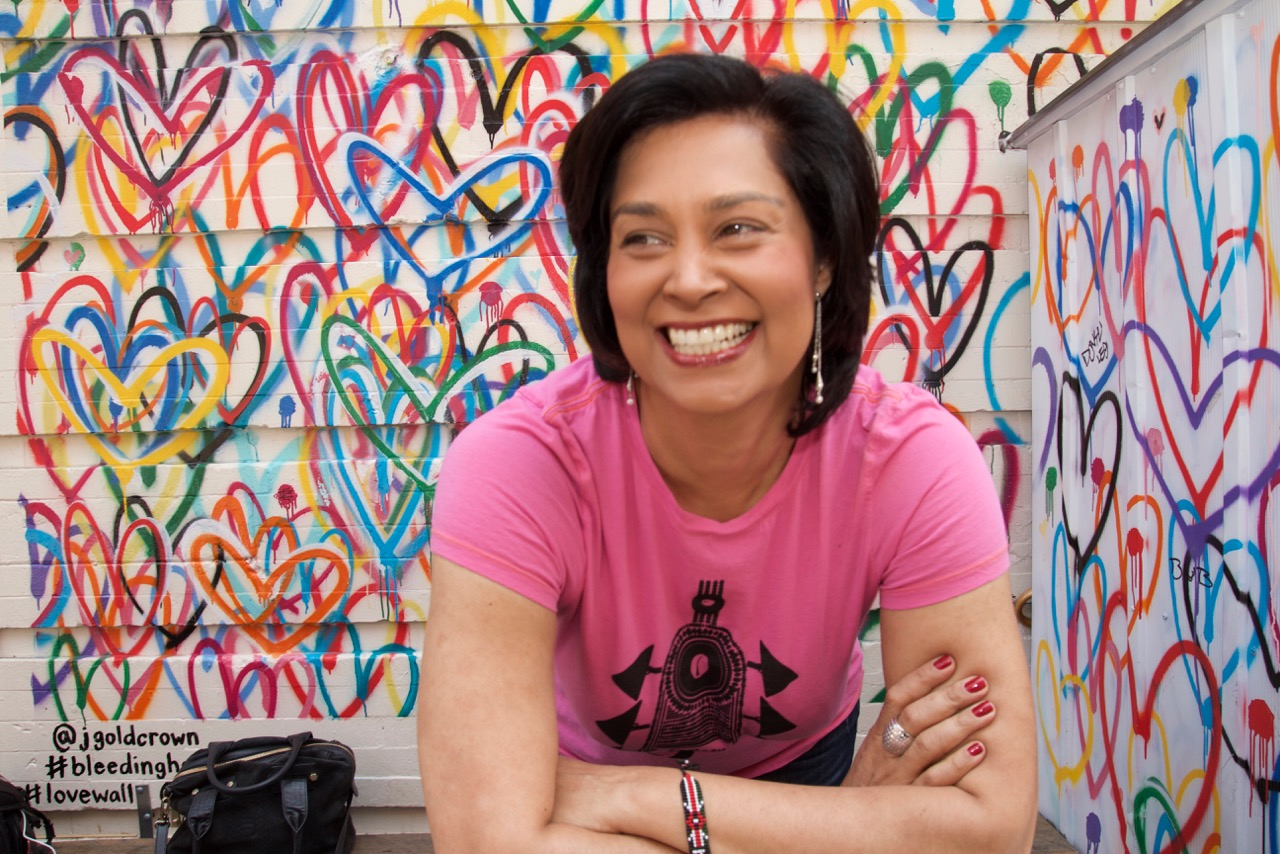
- Zain Verjee in 2026
- Born: Zain Verjee; February 11, 1974 (age 52); Nairobi, Kenya
- Occupation: Journalist
- Notable credit(s): CNN International's World One, Zain Verjee Group
- Website: zainverjeegroup.com akomanet.com

Zain Verjee (born February 11, 1974) is a Kenyan-born Canadian journalist based in Nairobi and the Los Angeles area. She is a former CNN anchor and correspondent.

== Education ==
Verjee was born in Kenya and attended Hillcrest Prep School and Hillcrest Secondary School in Nairobi. She later received her undergraduate degree in English from McGill University in Montreal. She graduated from Oxford University with a Master of Studies degree in Creative Writing.

== Career ==
=== Journalism ===
Verjee started working as a radio DJ for 98.4 Capital FM. She became more interested in journalism after the reporting of the 1998 bombing of the US embassy in Nairobi, which was close to the radio station. She became a news presenter on Kenya Television Network shortly afterward, as well as doing some work for the BBC.

Verjee joined CNN in 2000. As the State Department correspondent covering Condoleezza Rice, Verjee travelled the world covering U.S. foreign policy. Among her journeys, she covered the trip Rice took to Libya, and eventually was a lead reporter covering the fall of Muammar Gaddafi.

In July 2006, she reported from the Korean DMZ, winning an award for the coverage. In September 2006, she interviewed the former Iranian president Mohammad Khatami on his first visit to Chicago.

While reporting on protests following Kenya's national elections in 2008, Verjee was hit by a tear gas canister shot by police.

Verjee was the anchor of CNN International's European daytime program World One. She worked as a newsreader for The Situation Room and as a co-anchor of CNN International's Your World Today with Jim Clancy.

In April 2014, Verjee announced she was leaving CNN after 14 years to create her own media production company.

=== Zain Verjee Group ===
Zain Verjee Group is based in New York and Nairobi with a focus on African businesses and lifestyle stories. They have worked with Bloomberg Media, Bloomberg Philanthropies, the Equity Group Foundation of Kenya, the World Health Organization, the MiSK Foundation, and the United Nations Economic Commission for Africa on their public relations.

=== Entrepreneurship ===
Verjee co-founded aKoma Media, a continental network of workspaces for Africa's creative and cultural economy, in 2015. The company shut down in 2019 due to financial hardships.

Her other ventures include Amplify, a content creator fellowship with participants from East/West Africa and the U.S., in partnership with MasterCard Foundation.

== Personal life ==
Verjee is an Ismaili Muslim, a minority group in the Shia sect of Islam. When she was 23, she published a children's book, Live & On the Air. It explores experiences of a young girl who moves from rural Kenya to Nairobi to work as a broadcaster.

In January 2014, Verjee reported that she had struggled with psoriasis since her childhood and though it affected the way she related with others, she won the battle against the disease through eating well and maintaining a good mental attitude.
