= Lynda Kinkade =

Australian journalist and a CNN anchor

- Born: Sydney, Australia
- Education: University of Technology Sydney (BA)
- Occupations: Journalist, news anchor
- Employer: CNN
- Known for: CNN Newsroom; International Desk (weekend editions); CNN Today
- Spouse: Travis Jackson
- Children: 3

Lynda Kinkade is an Australian journalist and a CNN anchor currently based at CNN's world headquarters located in Atlanta, Georgia. Since August 2014, she has anchored the weekend editions of CNN International's Newsroom and does the same on some weekdays. She is also a sit-in host in Atlanta of One World and other shows such as the Middle East afternoon's Connect the World and North American primetime's The Brief. Kinkade likewise anchored several past weekday programs, filling in on First Move, the European primetime show The World Right Now and the Asia breakfast show CNN Today.

== Career ==
Kinkade began her broadcasting career in 2002 when she joined the Seven Network in her second year of university as a political researcher. She worked on the 2003 New South Wales state election coverage. Her research on each electorate in New South Wales was published and used during the election coverage by the anchors, reporters and producers.

Following the election Kinkade was hired by Sunrise and worked the graveyard shifts as junior producer throughout her final year of university.

After completing her degree at the University of Technology Sydney with a distinction average, Kinkade moved to the country to gain field experience working as a roving reporter for NBN Television in Newcastle, Tweed Heads and Lismore.

Kinkade joined the Nine Network twelve months later in December 2004 as an assistant chief of staff, going on to become a producer and reporter on Today, Nine Afternoon News, Nightline and at Nine News Sydney. She also presented the weekend edition of the Qantas Inflight News. During her four years at the network Kinkade worked on coverage which included 2005 Nias Island Sea King crash, the death of Pope John Paul II, the 2004 Indian Ocean earthquake and tsunami and 2005 Cronulla riots.

In December 2008, Kinkade moved to Melbourne re-joining Seven News as a national correspondent for the nightly public affairs program Today Tonight. Kinkade pursued a number of investigations which included one-on-one interviews with Australian Prime Minister Kevin Rudd and former U.S. Vice President Al Gore. She also reported extensively on the Black Saturday bush fires and was the first reporter on a convoy with families as they returned to the devastated town of Kinglake, Victoria. Kinkade was a regular reporter at the Australian Open and the Logie Awards. Her entertainment interviews included John Travolta, Toni Collette, Rachel Griffiths and Jennifer Hawkins.

In December 2013, Kinkade resigned from Seven News and moved to New York City to work as a freelance foreign correspondent. She covered breaking news and filed reports for Sunrise, Seven newscasts and Today Tonight. She also wrote for The Courier-Mail and The Daily Telegraph. Her stories including 2014 East Harlem gas explosion, the Ebola virus disease outbreak, the downing of Malaysia Airlines Flight 17 and the early 2014 North American cold wave known as the 'Polar Vortex.'

Kinkade began commuting from New York City to Atlanta in August 2014 to anchor the weekend, and sometimes weekday, editions of CNN Newsroom. After several months freelancing, CNN signed her full-time in January 2015 as an anchor and correspondent.

== Personal life ==
Kinkade has three daughters with her husband, Travis Jackson.
