= 1SSS =

Community radio station in Canberra

Triple S (1SSS)
Canberra; Australia
- Frequency: 103.9 MHz

Programming
- Format: Easy listening Horse racing Sports radio

Ownership
- Owner: Jim Paterson

History
- First air date: 4 November 1986; 38 years ago
- Last air date: 31 January 2003; 22 years ago
- Former call signs: 2SSS (1986–1993)

Technical information
- Class: Community radio

Triple S (callsign: 1SSS) was a community FM radio station in Canberra, on the frequency 103.9 MHz. The station was managed by Jim Paterson for the station's whole 18-year lifespan, beginning his appointment in 1985.

== History ==
It began broadcasting on 4 November 1986, as 2SSS, mainly broadcasting horse racing programs. The station began test transmissions on 28 October 1986. The station was Australia's first public sports radio station, and originally also had an easy listening music format when not broadcasting sport programming. The station changed callsign to 1SSS on 13 September 1993, in line with the Australian Broadcasting Authority's then-new voluntary code for Australian Capital Territory (Canberra) radio stations which were now regarded as being in their own state. The station was informed by the ABA about the call sign change. The station was branded as Triple S between 1993 and 2003.

The station ceased broadcasting horse racing programs on 30 June 2002, after ACTTAB made a deal with Melbourne horse racing and sports station Sport 927. At the time, Triple S planned to survive as a sports radio station. The station broadcast the Australian Capital Territory Legislative Assembly's Question time in 2003, however the station ceased broadcasting later that year on 31 January 2003. Its frequency was then used by ABC NewsRadio.

== Notable personalities ==
Many notable personalities worked at Triple S including:

- Rosemary Church (now works at CNN International)
- Gaven Morris (at the time of the Triple S closure he worked at CNN International; he worked at the Australian Broadcasting Corporation from 1993 until 2021 in three separate stints; now working for Australian agency group Bastion as the Bastion Transform CEO)
- Chris Coleman (now works at ACT Policing)
