= Isa Soares (journalist) =

Portuguese journalist based in London

- Born: Lisbon, Portugal
- Education: University of Bristol (MA); King's College London (BA)
- Occupations: Journalist; news anchor; correspondent
- Employer: CNN International

Isa Soares is a Portuguese journalist based in London, working as a news anchor and international correspondent for CNN International. She is the host of Isa Soares Tonight, which airs every weeknight.

Soares won the Emmy Award for Outstanding Business, Consumer or Economic Report in 2020 for her investigation on Nicolás Maduro's gold mining in Venezuela, named "Maduro's Blood Gold".

== Early life and education ==
Isa Soares was born and raised in Lisbon, Portugal, and spent time in Andalusia, Spain, before moving to England. She received a bachelor's degree in Hispanic and Lusophone Studies from King's College London and a master's degree in International Relations and Economics from the University of Bristol.

Initially intending to become a diplomat, she was drawn to journalism after applying for an internship at CNN International's Public Relations department, towards the end of her master's degree studies.

== Career ==
Soares joined CNN International as an intern in the Public Relations department. At the end of the internship, she was invited to stay for another internship with the Sports team, who were needing someone who could speak Portuguese to cover the UEFA Euro 2004 tournament, that would be taking place in Portugal. Subsequently, she was hired as production assistant.

Soares worked mainly as a producer in her early career, and had a breakthrough when she was invited to speak about the Portuguese financial crisis on Richard Quest's show. Afterwards, she was invited to do more work as news reporter and correspondent. As a correspondent, she has covered major events in Europe and Latin America.

As a news anchor, Soares has done work for the shows Quest Means Business, Your World Today and CNN Newsroom. Since July 2022, she is the anchor of her own news show Isa Soares Tonight.

== Awards ==
- 2020: Emmy Award for Outstanding Business, Consumer or Economic Report – "Maduro's Blood Gold"
