= International Desk =

2009–2019 news TV program

- Also known as: International Desk with Robyn Curnow
- Presented by: Robyn Curnow (2014-2019); Hala Gorani (2009–2014); Michael Holmes (2011–2014); Isha Sesay (2009–2011); Fionnuala Sweeney (substitute); Lynda Kinkade (substitute)

Production
- Production locations: CNN Center, Atlanta
- Running time: 60 minutes

Original release
- Network: CNN International
- Release: February 9, 2009 – September 20, 2019

International Desk (also referred to as the I-Desk) was a news program on CNN International. It delivered a round-up of the day's events. The show was a late night program for Asia, an afternoon broadcast in Europe and a mid-morning news program for the Americas. I-Desk aired live weekdays during the 10 am hour (ET) from CNN Center in Atlanta.

The show was launched in 2009 as part of a slate of new programming for primetime in Europe. Gorani was initially the sole anchor when I-Desk premiered on February 9, 2009, with the program airing once a day. Isha Sesay joined on April 20, 2009, to host the 10:00am ET edition, with Gorani hosting a second block two hours later. Sesay swapped roles with Holmes in September 2011, taking over as presenter of BackStory, while Holmes took over at I-Desk.

Starting in 2014 Robyn Curnow was the regular anchor of the show. It aired once a day again at 10:00 am. In 2019, due to the expansion of Connect the World with Becky Anderson, the International Desk was cancelled with Curnow taking the weekend Asia-Pacific morning news slot from 6:00 – 8:00 pm ET on Fridays, 2:00 p.m. and 4:00 p.m. ET slot on Saturdays, and 5:00 – 8:00 p.m. ET slot on Sundays.
