= CNN World News =

CNN international news broadcasts

- Created by: CNN International News; CNN International News Asia Pacific
- Developed by: CNN International News; CNN International News Asia Pacific
- Presented by: Errol Barnett
- Starring: Errol Barnett
- Country of origin: United States
- Original language: English

Production
- Production locations: CNN Center, Atlanta, United States; Hong Kong; London, United Kingdom; Dubai, United Arab Emirates
- Running time: Varies
- Production companies: CNN International; CNN International Asia Pacific

Original release
- Network: CNN International; CNN International Asia Pacific
- Release: September 1985 – present

Related
- CNN World News Asia; CNN World News Europe

CNN World News is an international news program that airs on CNN International and CNN International Asia Pacific. It is supplemented by CNN World News Asia and CNN World News Europe. Its main role is to update viewers of the latest news from around the world. It contains a weather update from the CNN World Weather Forecast News. CNN World News can usually air up to three times on weekends.

In 2020, CNN World News was the eighth most popular news show among adults in the United States, according to a YouGov survey.

== International broadcasts outside United States ==
In Singapore, it is broadcast live on MediaCorp TV Channel 5 daily at 6:00–6:30 am.

In Hong Kong, it is broadcast live on ATV World and TVB Pearl daily at 7:30–8:00 am.

In Indonesia, it is broadcast live on RCTI (relayed on RCTI; recorded on SCTV (simulcast on RCTI)) and SCTV (relayed on RCTI; recorded on RCTI (simulcast on SCTV)); carrying simulcast relayed and recorded network on RCTI daily at 05:30–06:00 am.

== Simulcast in the International ==
International simulcast relay network Radio and Television on CNN International News Asia Pacific such :

Television

- Indonesia : RCTI (recorded on SCTV in 1997 and now recorded on JakTV and MNC International)/SCTV (recorded on RCTI in 1997)/JakTV (recorded on RCTI and MNC International)/CNN Indonesia
- Malaysia : TV1/TV Kuala Lumpur/TV Selangor
- Singapore : MediaCorp TV Channel 5/MediaCorp HD5
- Brunei : RTB TV2
- Philippines : DZKB-TV
- China : Shanghai International Television
- Hong Kong : ViuTVsix
- Thailand : TrueVisions
- United States : CNN

Radio:

- Indonesia : Radio Elshinta News and Talk
- Malaysia : Klasik Nasional FM/Kuala Lumpur FM/Selangor FM/Suara Malaysia/Radio24
- Singapore : CNA938
- Brunei : Radio News in English
- China : China English International News Radio
- Hong Kong : Radio Hong Kong National News in English/Radio Hong Kong International News in English
- United States : IRN/USA Radio Network

== Notable presenters ==
- Errol Barnett
- Ralph Begleiter hosted CNN World News in the 1990s.
