= Great Wraps =

American quick-serve restaurant chain

Logo

Great Wraps is an American quick serve restaurant founded in 1974 with 29 locations in 9 states and Washington, D.C., primarily in airports. Its menu consists of hot, wrapped sandwiches (including their signature Gyro Wrap), cheesesteaks, rice bowls and frozen smoothies.

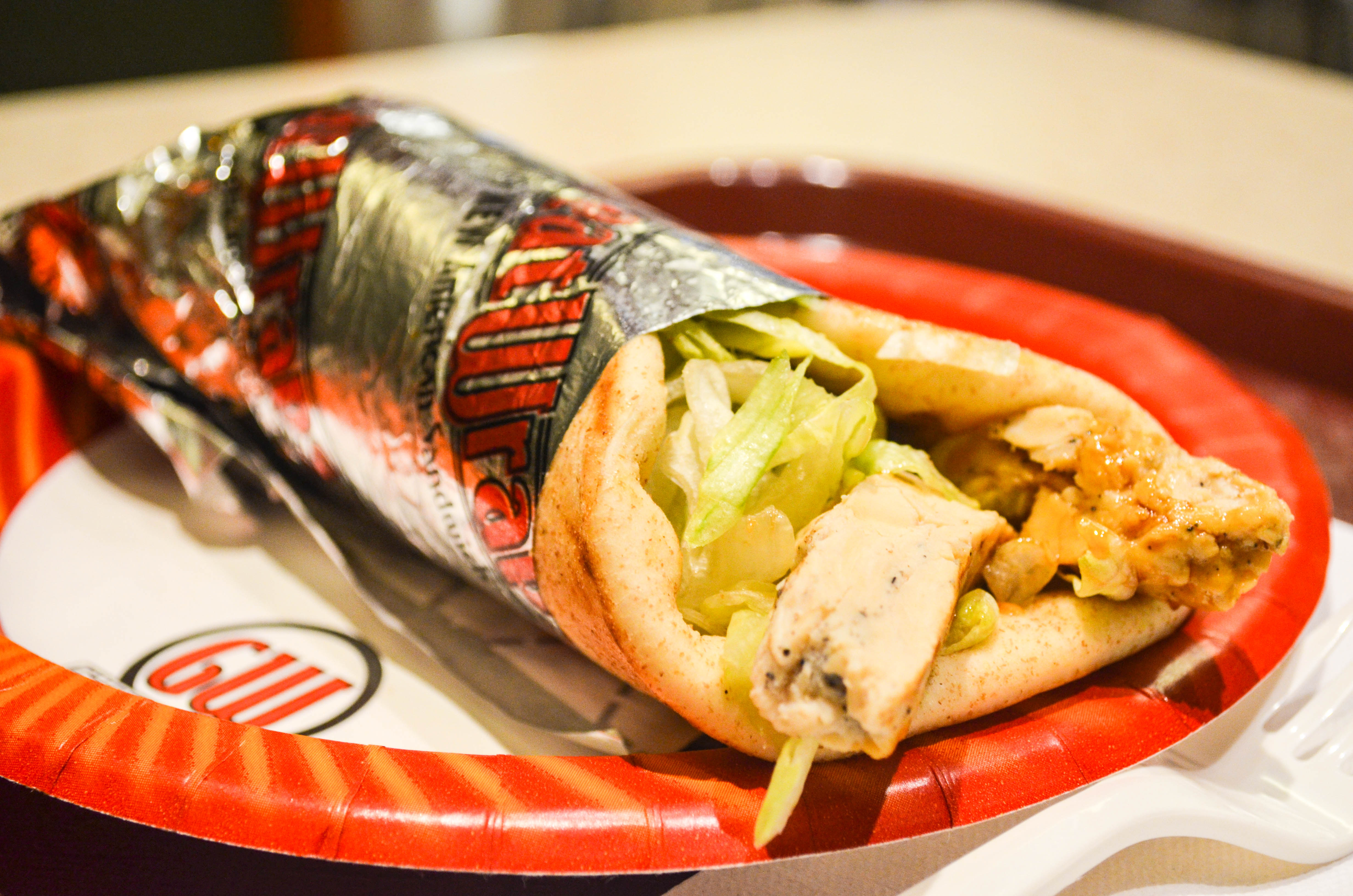
A wrap pictured at Tyson's Corner, Virginia

Great Wraps is a franchise, established as a company in 1974, and franchised in 1986. The company's headquarters is in Atlanta, Georgia. The chief executive officer is Mark Kaplan. Bonds rated Great Wraps as one of the top 100 North American Franchises.
