= Colleen McEdwards =

Canadian-American journalist and educator

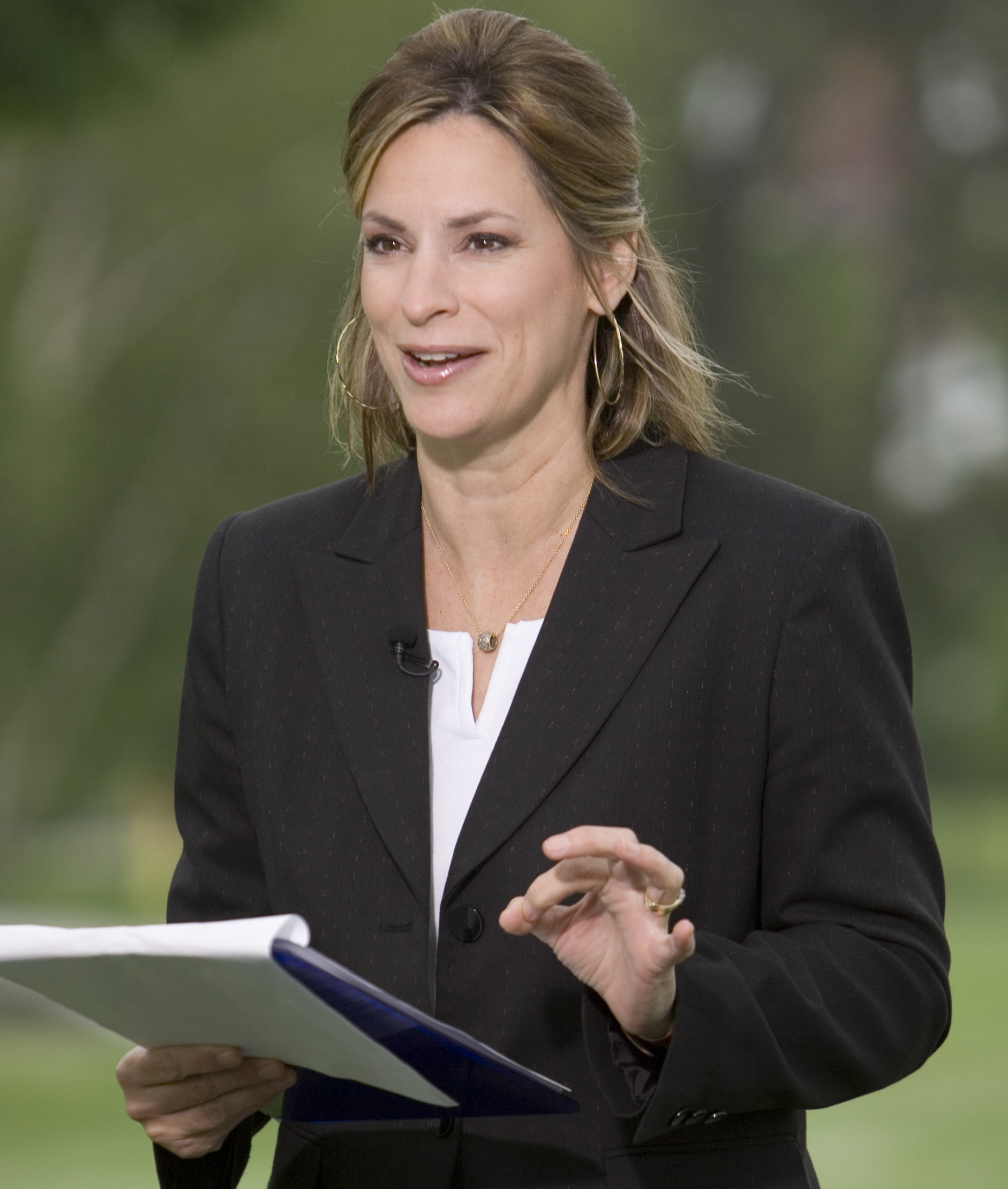
- Born: 1964 (age 61–62); Ontario, Canada
- Education: PhD in education
- Alma mater: Northcentral University
- Occupation: Educator
- Website: cmcedwards.wix.com/colleenmcedwards

Colleen McEdwards (born 1964 in Southern Ontario, Canada) is a Canadian-American journalist and educator. She reported for CBC News for 10 years and CNN International for 16 years. After suffering from debilitating vertigo, she left broadcasting and earned a PhD in Education in 2012, and has taught at the University of Florida, Georgia State University, and as an adjunct professor for two semesters at the University of North Alabama.

== Early life and education ==
Colleen McEdwards received the inaugural alumni achievement award from the University of Waterloo, where she earned an Honors BA in English literature. Her first experience of journalism came while studying abroad in the former Soviet Union. While in Leningrad, she assisted an MTV crew covering Billy Joel's historic 1987 Soviet Union concert tour.

Following a three-decade career in journalism, McEdwards completed an MA and PhD in education.

She speaks French and English and reads Russian.

== Journalism career ==
McEdwards has been a journalist in online, print, and broadcasting formats for more than 25 years. She was a senior political reporter with CBC News in Toronto, Ontario. She won awards for her political coverage, including her coverage of the trial of Paul Bernardo and Karla Homolka. Covering legal affairs, she was an outspoken critic of court-imposed publication bans.

She joined CNN International (CNNI) during the 1997 Asian financial crisis, and covered major global events for over 16 years in the field or at the breaking news anchor desk. She reported from Moscow during Vladimir Putin's first term, covered the withdrawal of Soviet troops from Czechoslovakia and developed expertise in Eastern European affairs. Her international assignments for CNNI included the Pan Am Flight 103 bombing trial, the global SARS outbreak, and the 2008 US Election campaign.

She received international recognition for her anchoring during the downing of SwissAir 111, the Iraq War, the 2004 Indian Ocean earthquake and tsunami, the 2008 financial crisis, Taiwan's Red Shirt uprising, and the September 11 attacks.

US Ambassador Richard Holbrooke described her as one of the most intelligent interviewers and professional presences on international television, and that he always appreciated being interviewed by her. McEdwards was referenced as a member of a "dream team" for international news coverage in a Financial Times column.

McEdwards continues to consult in the digital media and journalism entrepreneurship industry. She is a Fulbright Specialist having completed digital media training projects in Trinidad and Tobago. She is also a published author of poetry, short stories, academic papers and family biographies.

== Educator ==
McEdwards has been a professor of communications, journalism and digital media at the University of Florida College of Journalism and Communications (CJC Online) and at Georgia State University (GSU), where she directed study-abroad programs in new media and entrepreneurship in Asia and served as director of the department's writing center.

She also taught at Georgia Tech, Kennesaw State University, Saybrook University, and the University of North Alabama. McEdwards won a "Digital Champions" fellowship at GSU, and a Scripps Howard Fellowship to the Cronkite School to promote and develop media entrepreneurship curricula.

== Personal life and philanthropy ==
McEdwards is a trainer and mentor to young journalists and participates in many education and training events and professional affiliations. As a member of GSU's President's Society, McEdwards supports scholarships for minority students studying abroad and women's philanthropy initiatives. She served on a Georgia Communications and Government Relations Advisory Council related to educational opportunities for students from all socioeconomic backgrounds. She has been a donor and a judge for various social impact media awards and access initiatives globally.

McEdwards was moderator at the Yale Symposium on Human Trafficking and has moderated for organisations such as the Ford Foundation for causes related to the persecution of journalists and the promotion of young entrepreneurs.

She became a US citizen in 2008, while retaining her Canadian citizenship.

In 2011, McEdwards suffered a bout of debilitating vertigo linked to unilateral deafness and vestibular degeneration. Live studio conditions were a factor. She has advocated for the Canadian Hearing Society and has volunteered with the Vestibular Disorders Association (VEDA) to increase public awareness about hearing loss, Ménière's disease, dizziness and balance issues.
