= Rosemary Church =

British-Australian television journalist and presenter

- Born: 10 November 1962 (age 63); Belfast, Northern Ireland
- Education: Australian National University; University of Canberra
- Occupations: CNN International anchor and correspondent (1998–present)
- Years active: 1991–present

Rosemary Church (born 10 November 1962) is an Australian CNN International news anchor. Based at the network's world headquarters in Atlanta, she anchors the 2 to 4 a.m. ET edition of CNN Newsroom. She previously worked as a reporter and newsreader for the Australian Broadcasting Corporation, news and current affairs division.

== Early life and education ==
Born in Belfast, Northern Ireland, Church has lived in England and Australia. She has a Bachelor of Arts degree from the Australian National University in Canberra and has completed graduate studies in Media and Law.

== Career ==
Church joined CNN International in August 1998 as an anchor on World News, based in the network's Atlanta headquarters.

At ABC News, she primarily worked for the international arm Australia Television as Senior Anchor. She also reported for the program Foreign Correspondent and anchored the evening news in Tasmania and the summer edition of The World At Noon.

Previously she presented weekend weather on Ten Capital and worked for five years in Canberra for the National Media Liaison Service. She was also an news anchor on Ten Capital.

Church spent several years in the late 1980s to early 1990s as the host of a Sunday morning radio show "Church on Sunday" on 2SSS-FM, later called Triple S, covering music and happenings in Canberra with notable guests such as Marilyn Dooley, National Film and Sound Archive and regular phone in guests like Keith (KC Bell) from Scullin, a rock and roll trivia buff, among others. 2SSS-FM was a community sports radio station, managed by James Patterson, covering the Canberra region. It ran from 1986 to 2003. Another notable that started out on Triple S was Gaven Morris, who was later with CNN before returning to Australia to rejoin the ABC as Director of News (2015).

Church won the New York Festival's TV programming award (silver) for coverage of the handover of Hong Kong to China in 1997.
