= Jonathan Mann (journalist) =

Canadian journalist (born 1960)

- Born: July 16, 1960 (age 64); Montreal, Quebec, Canada
- Education: B.A. York University
- Occupation: Journalist

Jonathan Mann (born July 16, 1960) is a retired Canadian journalist. For 30 years he worked for CNN International. He also worked for La Presse. During the presidency of Barack Obama, he hosted Political Mann on CNN. Every December, Mann hosted The Prize for Peace, a discussion with the Nobel Peace Prize winner, live from Oslo, Norway.

== Biography ==
Mann was born in Montreal, Quebec, Canada, to Adina and Harry Mann. His mother was a travel agent and his father a general practitioner and amateur actor. He received his primary school education at the Jewish People's School, where he also learned Hebrew and Yiddish. Mann received a bachelor's degree in philosophy from York University in Toronto, Ontario.

Early in his career, he worked as a freelance journalist in India covering the aftermath of the assassination of Indira Gandhi in 1984. He captured Canadian and international headlines when, defying a ban imposed on foreigners in the state of Punjab, he was arrested and placed in police custody in the city of Amritsar. Upon receiving the news, his parents travelled to Ottawa to lobby Canada's federal government to intervene on his behalf. The incident received widespread media coverage and was even debated during question period in the House of Commons. Thanks largely to a concerted diplomatic effort by the Canadian government, Mann was released one week later. The attention drawn to Mann during the affair is credited with helping launch his successful journalistic career, leading to work with the CBC Radio, NBC Radio, and later CNN, where he became the 24-hour news network's first Paris correspondent. As a Montreal native, he speaks fluent French.

He was based in Atlanta where he covered American politics and elections for CNN International, including for the program American Edition beginning in 1996, and hosted Political Mann and Insight, and retired in 2017.
