= Jim Clancy (journalist) =

American broadcast journalist (born 1953)

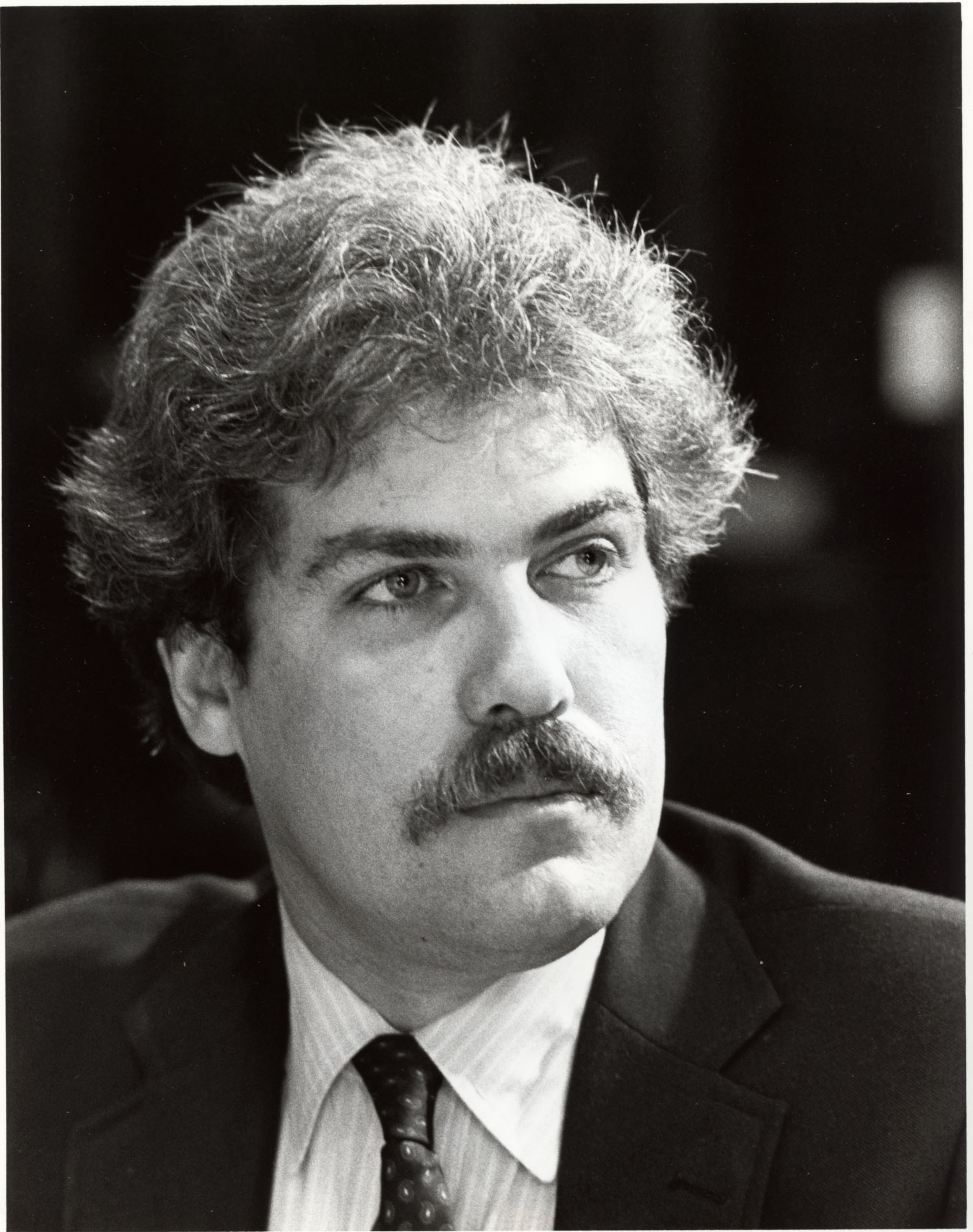
- Jim Clancy in San Francisco, late 1970s
- Born: James Clancy; 1953; Chicago, Illinois, U.S.
- Education: University of Denver
- Occupations: Journalist, television correspondent
- Years active: 1980s–2010s
- Employer: CNN
- Known for: International reporting; hosting The Brief with Jim Clancy

Jim Clancy is an American broadcast journalist, best known as a former correspondent and anchor on CNN International. He formerly anchored several CNN news reports, including The World Today and The Brief, before his resignation following a series of controversial exchanges with other users on Twitter.

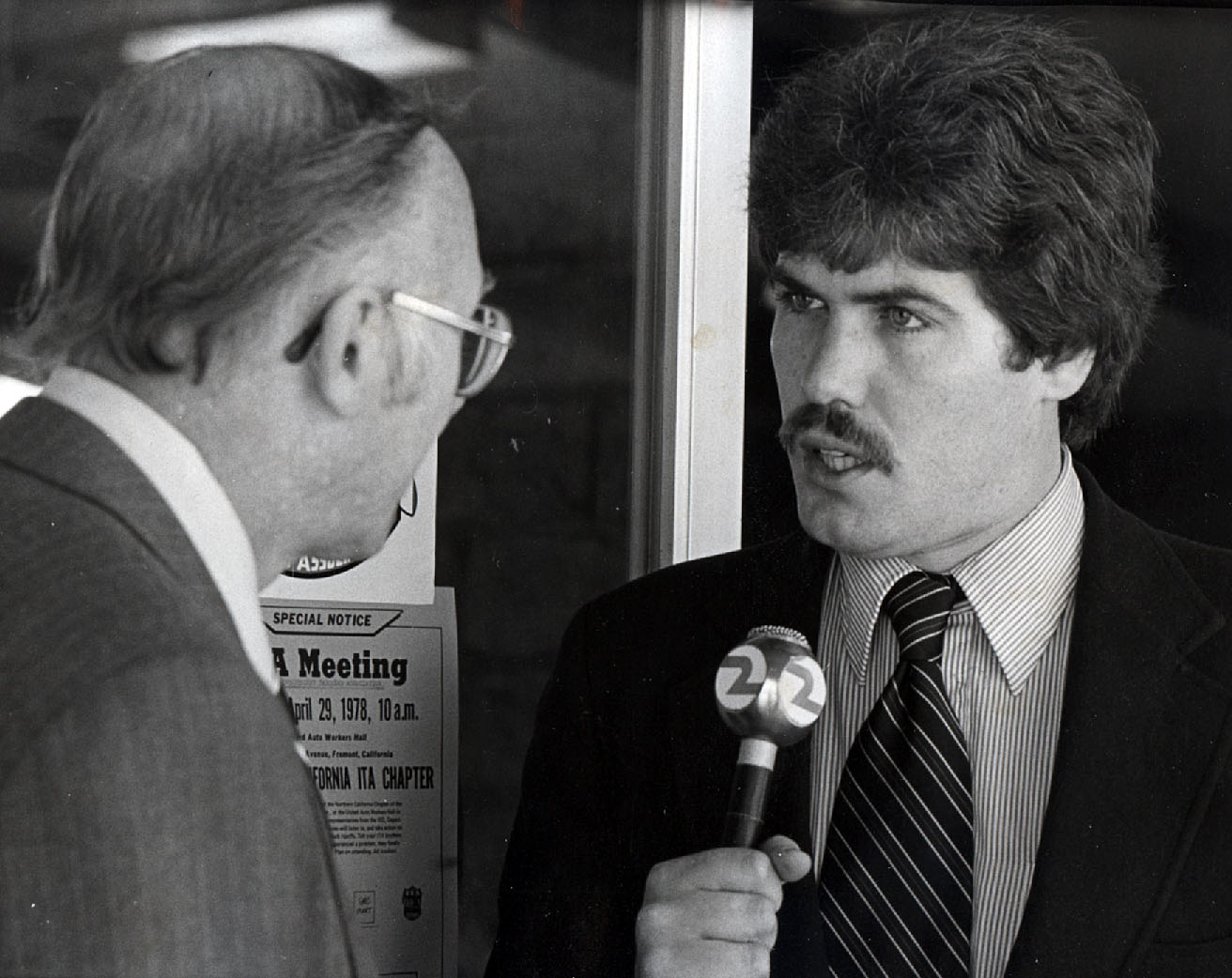
Clancy in San Francisco, late 1970s

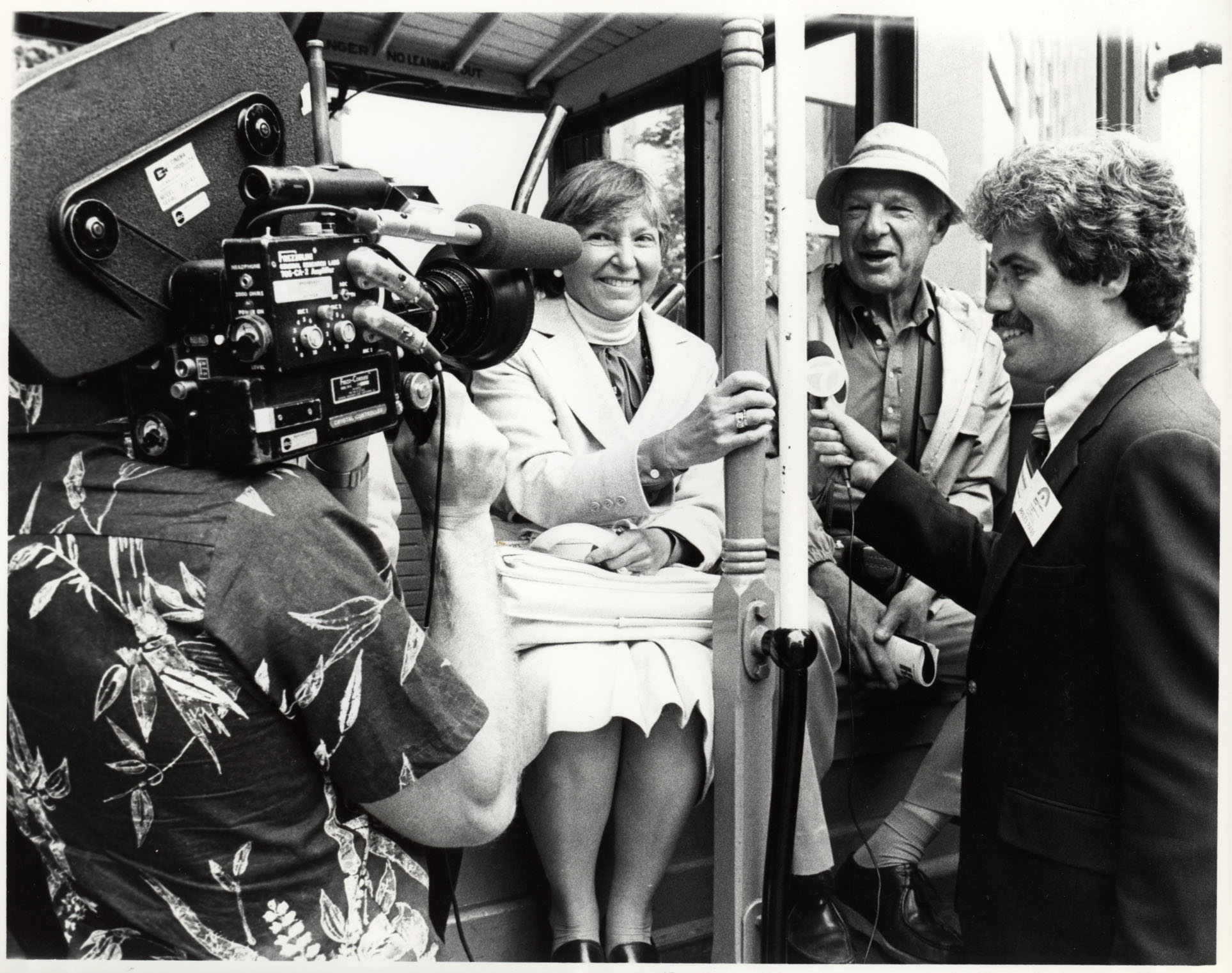
Clancy interviewing tourists on cable car in San Francisco, late 1970s

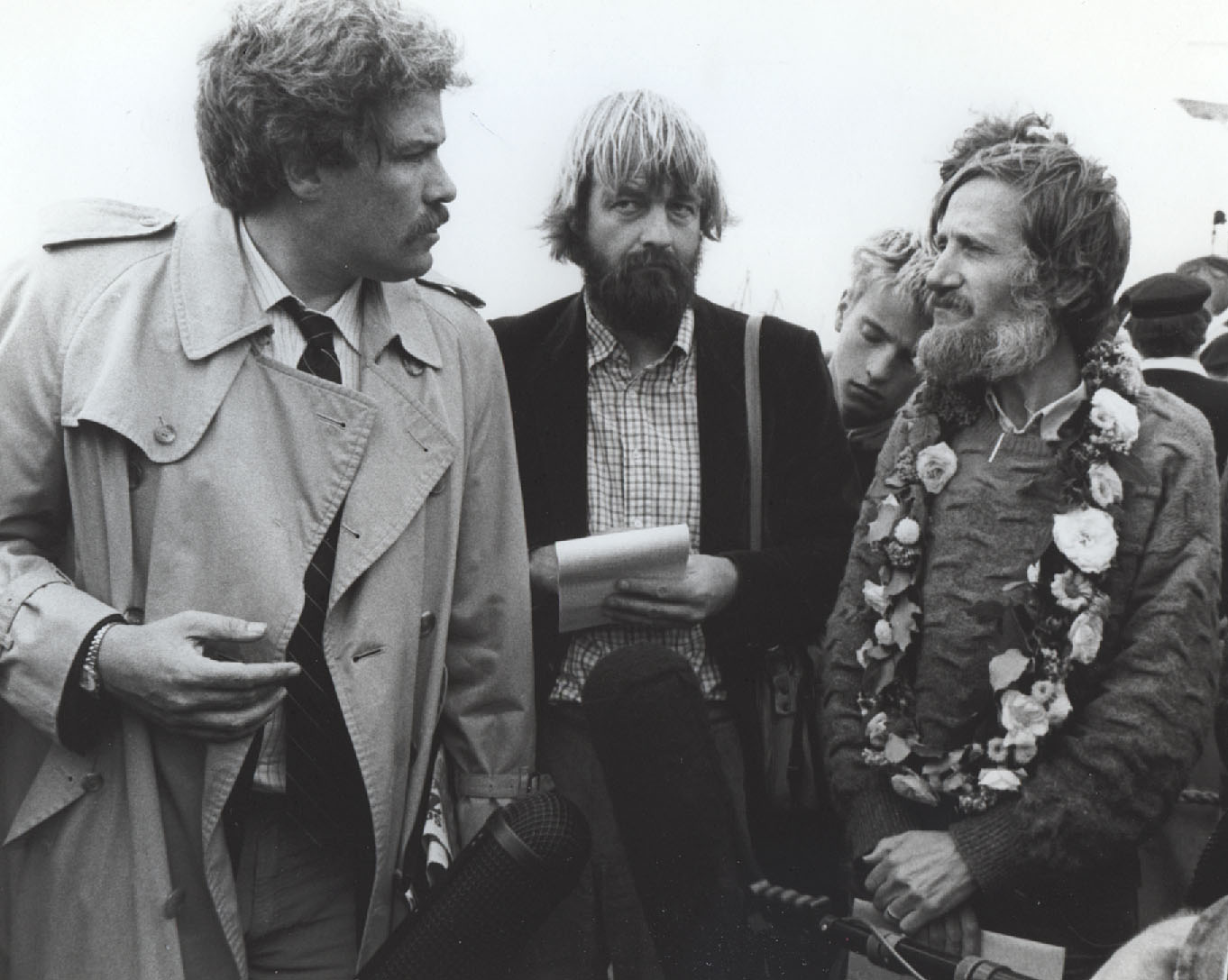
Clancy in Hamburg, Germany, 1986.

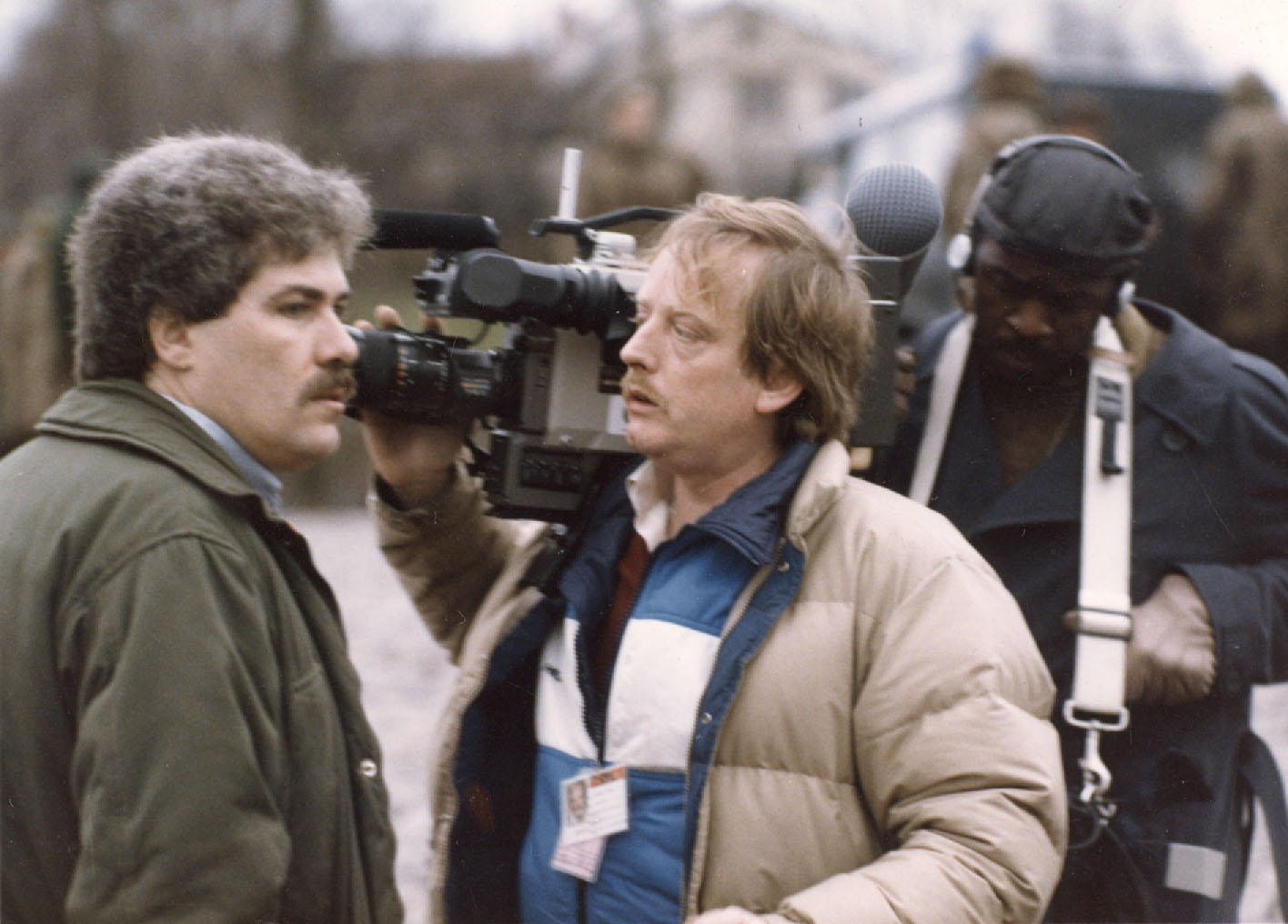
Clancy in Hamburg, Germany, 1986.

== Career ==
From 1982 to 1996, Clancy was a CNN international correspondent in the Beirut, Frankfurt, Rome and London bureaus. During this time, he won the George Polk Award for his reporting on the genocide in Rwanda, the DuPont-Columbia Award for coverage of the war in Bosnia, an Emmy Award for reporting on the famine and international intervention in Somalia and the A.H. Boerma Award for his coverage of global food and hunger issues. Clancy joined CNN in 1981 as a national correspondent after an extensive career in local radio and television in Denver, Colorado and San Francisco, California.

In 2012, Clancy contributed to CNN'S Emmy Award-winning coverage of the resignation of Egyptian President Hosni Mubarak. The Emmy for "Outstanding Live Coverage of a Current News Story" was one of two awards CNN received in 2012.

In January 2015, Clancy made a series of tweets about Israel and the Charlie Hebdo shooting. On January 16, 2015, CNN announced Clancy had retired from the network after nearly 34 years. Clancy later said he had no regrets and criticized Twitter trolls saying "I don't have to put up with this."
