= CNN Center =

Former headquarters of CNN in Atlanta, Georgia, United States

The Center
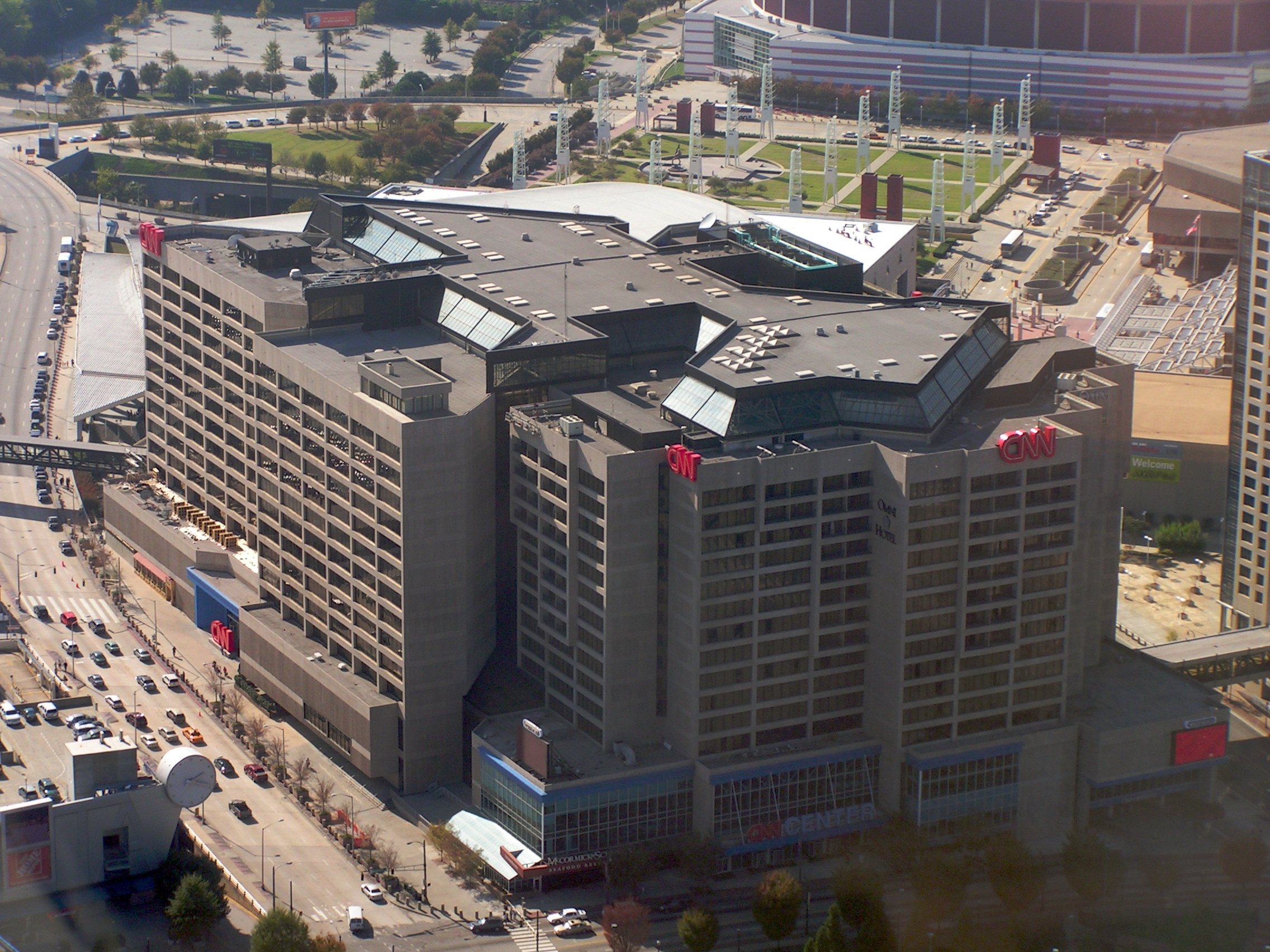
- Aerial view of The Center with previous CNN signage in 2007
- Former names: Omni Complex (1976–1987); CNN Center (1987–2024)

General information
- Status: Completed
- Location: 1 CNN Center; Atlanta, Georgia; 30303
- Coordinates: 33.757934°N 84.394811°W
- Current tenants: List of stores and restaurants
- Opened: 1976; 50 years ago
- Owner: Turner Broadcasting System (Occupied from 1985 to 2018); AT&T (2018 - 2021); CP Group (2021 - Present)

Design and construction
- Architect: Tvsdesign
- Developer: Cousins Properties

Website
- www.thectratlanta.com

The Center (stylized The CTR), formerly and still commonly called the CNN Center, is the former international headquarters of U.S. cable network CNN in Atlanta, Georgia, United States. The main newsrooms and studios for several of CNN's news channels were located in the building. The facility's commercial office space was occupied by various units of the former Turner Broadcasting System, now part of Skydance Corporation. The Center is located in downtown Atlanta adjacent to Centennial Olympic Park.

In 2020, CNN announced that it would relocate its Atlanta operations back to the Turner Broadcasting Techwood campus in Midtown Atlanta. The One CNN Center office building was acquired by CP Group in 2021. Production activities moved back in October 2023, while the last of CNN's domestic programs moved in February 2024.

On April 4, 2024, CP Group announced that CNN Center would be renovated, and was in the process of being rebranded as "The Center."

== History ==
=== 1970s and 1980s ===
The building opened in 1976 as the Omni International Complex, a development by Cousins Properties. The Omni Coliseum, an NBA and NHL arena adjacent to the Omni International, had opened three years earlier, on October 14, 1972. The Omni International office building was largely vacant until CNN moved its headquarters there in 1987 from its Midtown Atlanta site (old home of the Progressive Club on 1050 Techwood Drive and home to Turner Broadcasting System). The building was bought for $42 million in 1985.

Over the years, the building had provided office space to various business tenants, as well as foreign consulates. The main floor featured an indoor ice rink, as well as a small number of restaurants and a Gold Mine video arcade. Sid and Marty Krofft built an indoor amusement park called The World of Sid and Marty Krofft, inspired by the creations of these popular children's television producers. Opened in 1976, it was the first indoor theme park in the United States, but it closed within six months. The complex also featured a multi-screen movie theater. For years, the theater offered daily showings of the 1939 film Gone with the Wind, which Ted Turner called "The greatest movie ever made".

=== 1990s ===
On May 11, 1997, the Omni Coliseum closed. Its replacement, Philips Arena (now State Farm Arena), broke ground on June 5, 1997. The Omni Coliseum was imploded on July 26, 1997, with the CNN Center taking on minor exterior window damage due to its close distance to the Omni Coliseum. Because of this, the CNN Center was expected to be damaged. Philips Arena opened on September 18, 1999.

=== 2000s ===
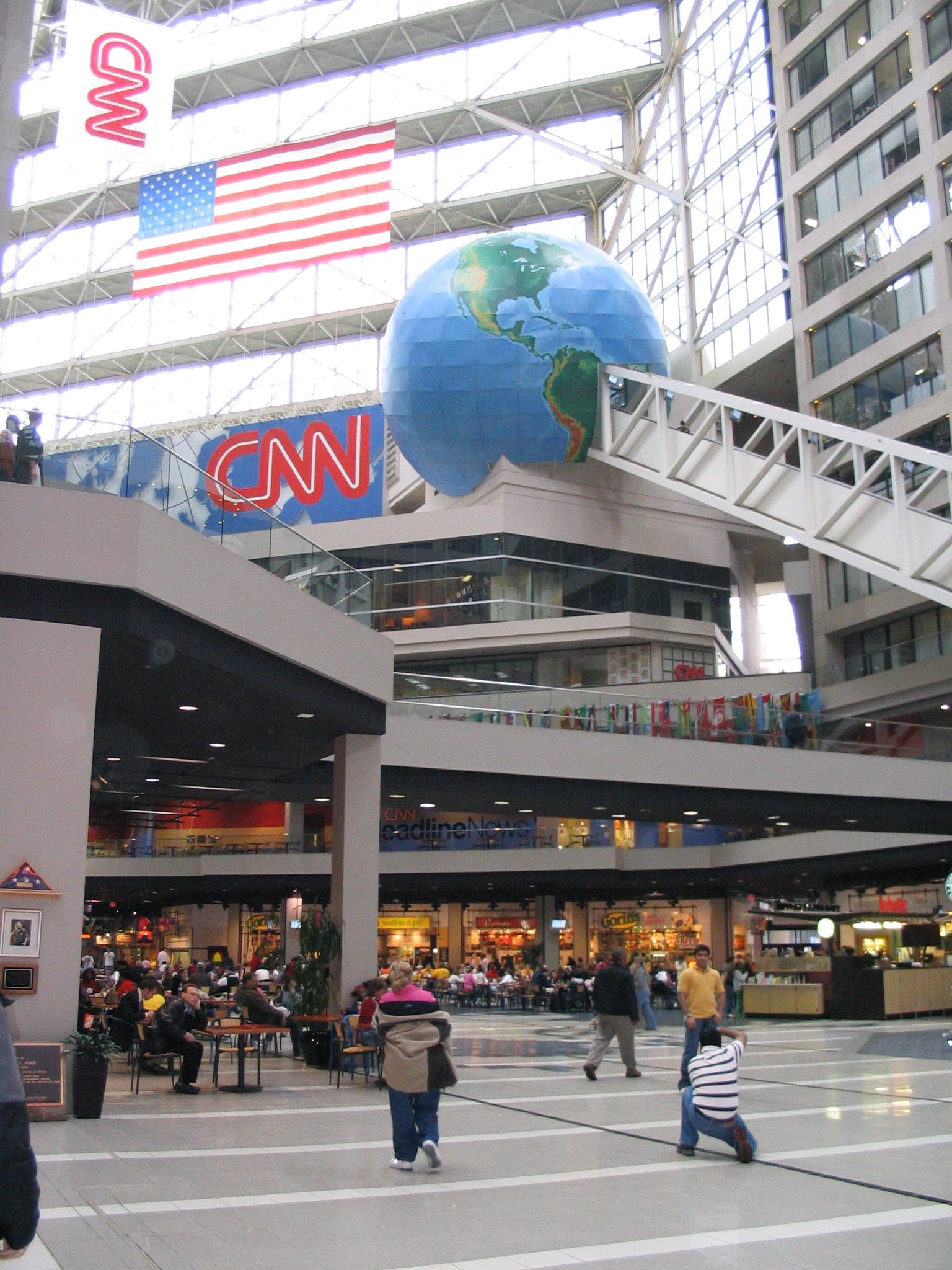
Interior view, 2006

On April 4, 2007, Arthur Mann, an employee at the Omni Hotel, shot and severely injured his ex-girlfriend Clara Riddles inside the CNN Center. The adjacent CNN.com newsroom was evacuated shortly after the first shots were heard. Mann was confronted and shot by a Turner Security Officer, and both Riddles and Mann were taken to a nearby hospital for treatment. Riddles later died of her injuries. An autopsy showed that Riddles was shot three times by Mann. The motive of the shooting is unknown.

On March 14, 2008, an EF-2 tornado passed through downtown Atlanta, damaging the CNN Center and leaving water and dust in the upper floors. The ceiling of the atrium was also damaged, allowing water to pour in and partially flood the food court. CNN's library was damaged, although it was not immediately known how much of its archives were damaged. Numerous injuries and widespread damage were reported overall. The Omni Hotel, attached to the CNN Center, was evacuated as a precaution, and more than 400 rooms had to be emptied of occupancy for two weeks.

=== 2010s ===
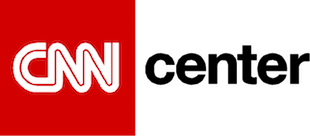
Final logo as CNN Center

On June 13, 2014, a car crashed into the CNN Center, causing minor structural damage. The driver claimed to have fallen asleep at the wheel, and was charged with driving under the influence (DUI) and possession of marijuana.

==== Disinvestment from Omni Hotel ====
In 2016, the chief financial officer (CFO) Pascal Desroches of Turner said the company would divest its 50% stake in the center's Omni Hotel in favor of redeveloping its Techwood campus in Atlanta. This is where other Turner broadcast operations are based.

=== 2020s ===
On May 29, 2020, the CNN Center became the scene of rioting in response to the murder of George Floyd in Minneapolis, Minnesota, four days earlier, as the building also houses a Zone 5 police precinct for the Atlanta Police Department. Rioters graffitied the CNN logo in the front of the building and caused property damage to the building's entrance glass curtain wall and APD vehicles; the front lobby was damaged, though protesters never breached into the core common area of the building, with the logo sign repainted shortly thereafter.

On June 29, 2020, exactly a month after the incident, WarnerMedia announced plans to sell the CNN Center. Once sold, WarnerMedia will continue to lease their existing space for several years until the Techwood campus, previously occupied by CNN until 1987, is expanded to accommodate CNN's Atlanta operations.

On November 21, 2020, a group of right-wing activists organized by the WalkAway campaign gathered in front of the CNN Center. In the 2020 presidential election, Joe Biden won the state's 16 electoral votes, the first Democrat to win the state since Bill Clinton in 1992. The protesters were inspired by claims of voter fraud.

On January 11, 2023, it was reported that CNN would be leaving the CNN Center before the end of 2023. CNN control room activities moved back to CNN's original Midtown Atlanta campus on October 30, 2023. Several weekend shows would continue to be based at CNN Center through the end of 2023. On February 25, 2024, CNN Newsroom and CNN This Morning Weekend aired their final broadcasts from the CNN Center, and moved to Techwood the following week.

On April 4, 2024, CP Group announced that CNN Center would be renovated and rebranded as "The Center."

== Features ==
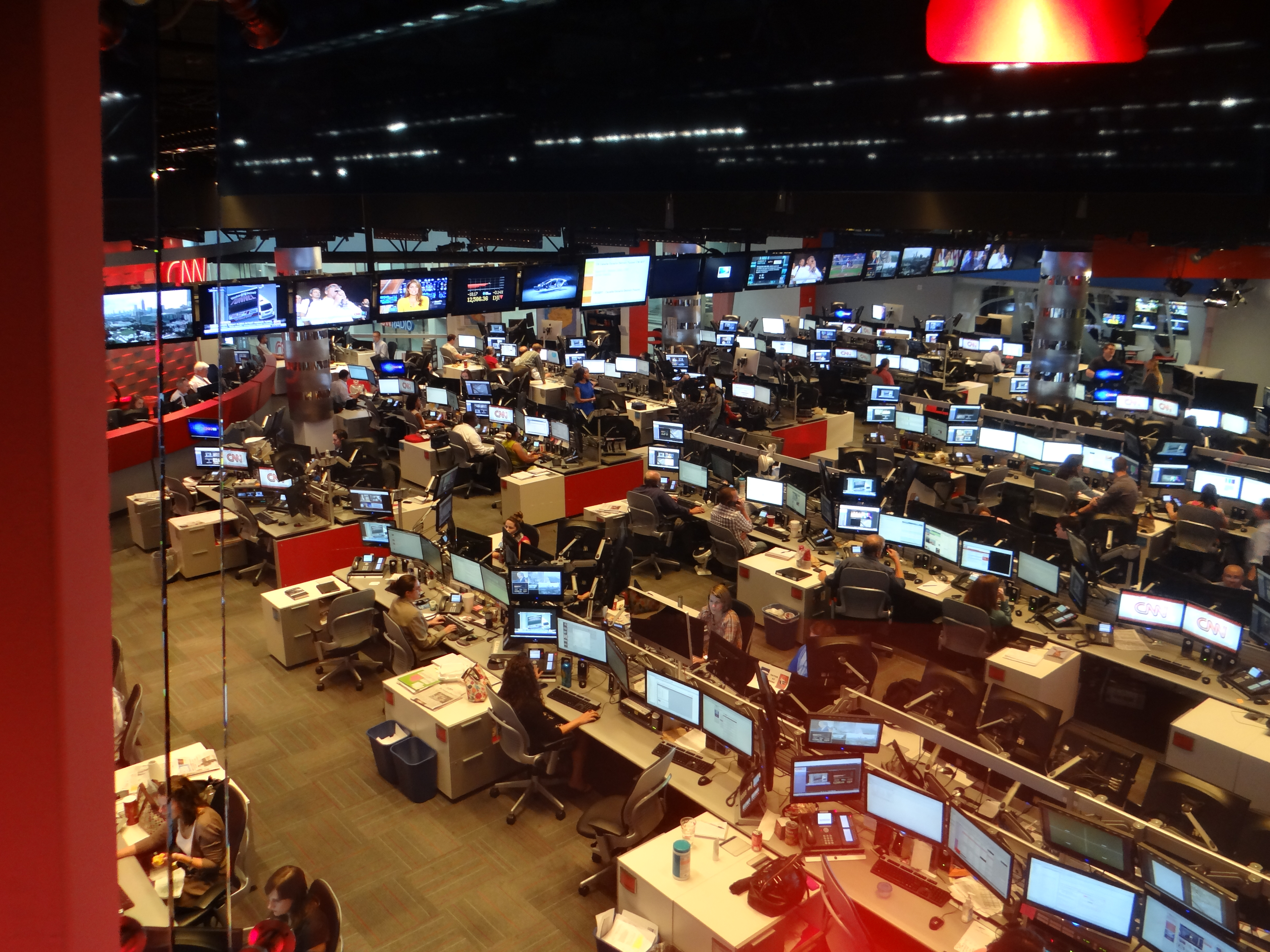
CNN Atlanta Newsroom

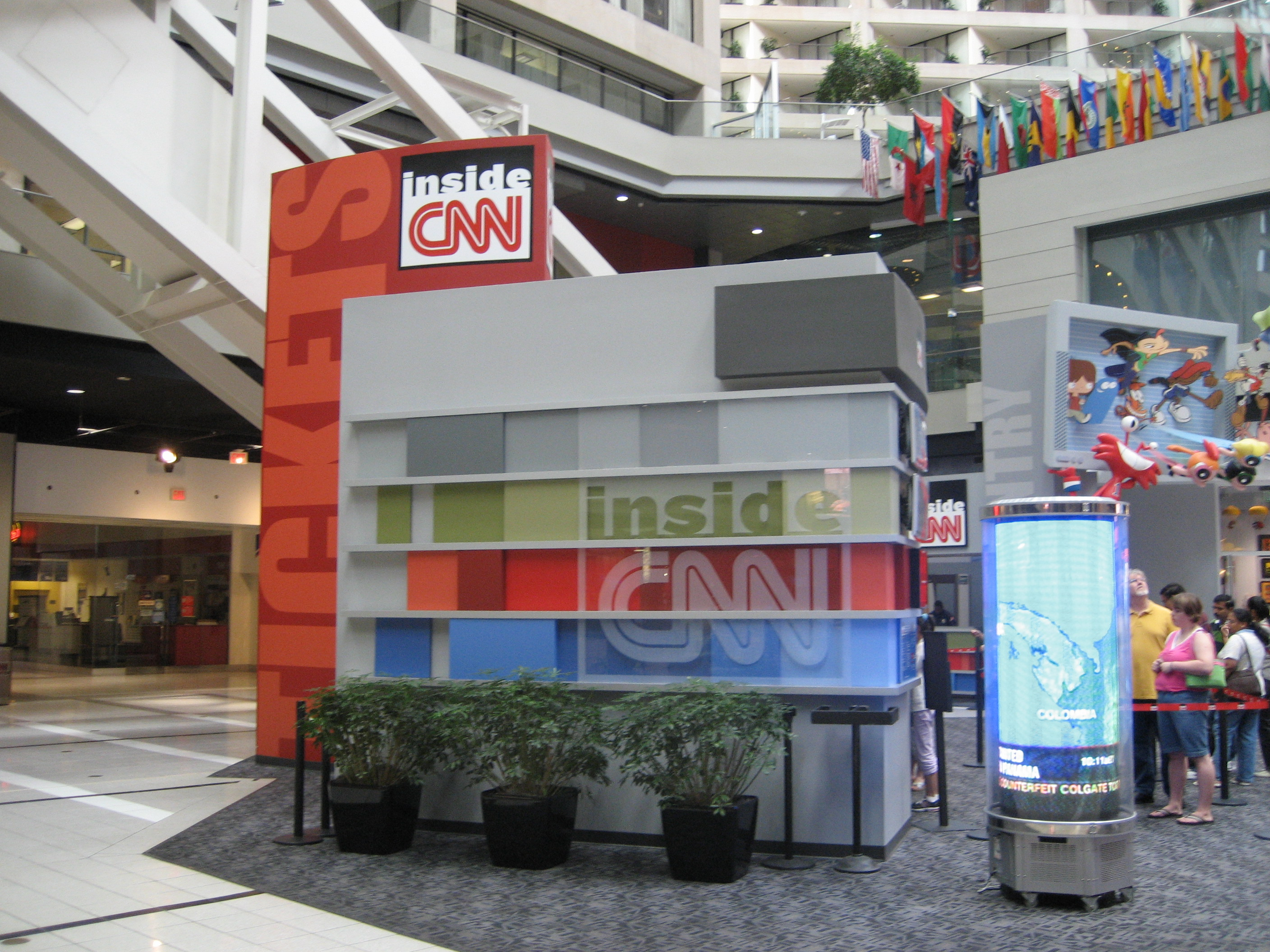
Inside CNN Studio Tour check-in

The CNN Center also houses an Omni Hotel and features a large atrium food court frequented by local business employees, tourists, attendees at State Farm Arena, and Mercedes-Benz Stadium events, and conference attendees from the nearby Georgia World Congress Center. CNN founder Ted Turner lived in a rooftop apartment in the complex, with an estimated size of under 700 square feet, for a period of time in the 1980s; the apartment was thereafter left untouched until his death in 2026.

CNN's multi-channel output to the world is broadcast on large screens around the center. Until 2020, studio tours were available and included demonstrations of technologies, such as Chroma key and teleprompters, as well as visits to viewing galleries overlooking the newsrooms and anchors of CNN International, HLN, CNN 10, and CNN en Español.

The atrium escalator used to first transport visitors to The World of Sid and Marty Krofft and later to the CNN tour has been listed in the Guinness Book of World Records as the "longest freestanding (supported only at the ends) escalator in the world"; it is 196 feet (60 m) long. Built for the theme park that once occupied the building, it is part of the building's original structure, making it very hard to remove. The steel exoskeleton remains, but the escalator was removed the week of February 24, 2025 as a part of the renovations transitioning the building from "The CNN Center" to "The Center."

MARTA rail service is provided to the CNN Center at the SEC District station. Access to the Red and Gold lines may be gained by a ten-fifteen minute walk to Peachtree Center station.

=== List of tenants ===
- Arby's
- Atlanta Police Department
- AT&T Store
- BurgerFi
- Cartoon Network Store
- Chick-fil-A
- China Breeze
- Dantanna's Downtown
- Dunkin' Donuts
- Fresh to Order
- Great Wraps
- McCormick & Schmick's Seafood Restaurants
- Moe's Southwest Grill
- Natural's Ice Cream, Yogurt & Smoothies
- Roman Delight
- Starbucks
- Subway
- TJ's Sandwiches
- U.S. Postal Store
- Wells Fargo Bank
