= Page Six =

Gossip column of the New York Post

- Page Six cover (January 15, 2024)
- Type: Celebrity gossip column, news website, mass media
- Format: Newspaper column
- Owner: New York Post (News Corp)
- Founder(s): Rupert Murdoch, James Brady
- Editor-in-chief: Ian Mohr
- Staff writers: 501-1,000
- Founded: November 1976
- Language: English
- Country: United States
- Circulation: 518,000+
- Readership: 872,000+
- ISSN: 1090-3321 (print); 2641-4139 (web)
- Website: pagesix.com

First edition of Page Six on January 3, 1977

Page Six is a celebrity gossip column and a brand of the American newspaper New York Post. It was created by the Post in November 1976, shortly after the newspaper was acquired by Rupert Murdoch. Murdoch tasked columnist James Brady with the column's creation, who along with other Post's editors named and designed it.

Page Six is New York Post's most successful sub-publication, comparable in popularity to the newspaper itself. Page Six is featured on New York Post's print newspapers and has its own website and Twitter account. Page Six has its own separate video studio and once had a TV show.

== Background and history ==
=== 1976 to 2009 ===
Page Six was created in November 1976 as a celebrity gossip column of the American newspaper New York Post at the request of Rupert Murdoch, the newspaper's new owner, who bought it at the time. He tasked columnist James Brady with the column's creation, who, along with other editors, designed the column. Brady named the column "Page Six" because it was initially printed on the Post's sixth page. Murdoch wanted the column to feature short news stories written by a variety of authors in a non-neutral tone. Brady said Murdoch was inspired by "William Hickey", a defunct gossip column published by the British newspaper Daily Express, when he wanted to create Page Six. Vanity Fair noted in 2006 that Page Six functioned similarly to it. It said stories on Page Six were written by a team of contributors in a "pithy" style, usually about celebrities and other well-known people. The stories were then sent to a lead editor of Page Six, who combined their tone and format into one.

On January 3, 1977, the first edition of Page Six was published; it discussed various personalities like Margaux Hemingway, Henry Kissinger, and John F. Kennedy. In the 1980s, Page Six was moved back two pages to expand the newspaper's size, now being located on page eight. Despite this, the name "Page Six" was not changed due to its prominence. In February 2000, the Post announced the launch of Page Six's own website, hosted on "pagesix.com". The site was said to be funded by donations and sponsorships and feature news not seen in the newspaper. Some gossip stories on the Post's website were moved to pagesix.com. In February 2006, the New York Post launched "Page Six magazine", a branch of Page Six that published magazines. The first issue of the magazine featured gossip, photos of celebrities, and restaurant reviews accompanied by a photo of Angelina Jolie on the cover. The issue earned $34,000 and the second issue was sold for $36,000.

In April 2006, it was reported that Page Six has appeared on page twelve. In June 2007, Page Six was expanded, now being printed on three pages of the newspaper instead of one. In September 2007, Page Six magazine started being issued weekly, editor Margi Conklin was appointed as its director. It was reported on January 28, 2009, that the magazine's publication rate was cut to four times a year due to financial problems. Page Six magazine later became defunct.

=== From 2009 ===
On January 31, 2009, 80-year old creator of Page Six James Brady was found dead in his home from natural causes. In August 2017, it was announced that Page Six will launch Page Six TV on September 18. Page Six TV was the column's television show initially hosted by John Fugelsang, Emily Smith, Carlos Greer, and Elizabeth Wagmeister. The studio of the show was designed by Camilla Connolly. Her idea for the studio was to make it look “borrowed” by adding exposed brick walls, rusty metal, and steel girders. The show was launched on September 17, 2017, and had high ratings according to Nielsen Data, higher than TMZ when it was launched on TV in 2007. Page Six TV was said to be transmitted on stations owned by Fox Corporation and have 49 million monthly viewers. The Post together with Endemol Shine North America, celebrated the launch of Page Six TV by hosting a premiere party in a Tao Group hotel. In May 2019, the second season of the show was launched; Elizabeth Wagmeister and Carlos Greer were chosen as new hosts due to Fugelsang quitting. In April 2019, the show was cancelled after the second season was finished. It was noted that it received low views and ratings, lower than other TV shows, such as Daily Mail TV.

In October 2018, the Post launched Page Six Style, a part of Page Six covering the beauty and fashion of celebrities. It is edited by Elana Fishman. In August 2019, Page Six launched Page Six Podcast, a weekly celebrity news and gossip podcast hosted by Maggie Coughlan and Ian Mohr. In January 2024, Page Six announced the construction of its own video studio in New York City. The studio is used for the production of daily entertainment and popular culture videos. It took one year for the construction to be finished. Brad Elders, chief operating officer of Page Six, said the studio's creation is a sign of the Post separating itself from the Page Six brand in an effort to diversify its advertising. The first anchor of the studio was announced to be Astra, a media personality of the Post.

In March 2024, Page Six launched an app called "Page Six Ad Manager", which is an advertising platform created with the help of DanAds. In February 2025, Page Six launched a new daily morning show hosted by the Post's editors Danny Murphy and Evan Real. The show reports celebrity and pop culture news and is featured on SiriusXM stations. In the same month, Page Six's video studio was renovated and expanded, and new equipment was installed for faster streaming and video production on social media. On November 4, 2025, Page Six and the Post partnered with streaming network Haystack News to feature its content on the platform. On November 20, 2025, Ian Mohr announced the launch of Page Six Hollywood, affiliated with the newspaper California Post.

== Leadership ==
After the first edition of Page Six was issued in 1977, James Brady stopped leading Page Six and was replaced with journalist Neal Travis from New Zealand. During his leadership, multiple editors for the column were hired, like journalist Anna Quindlen. Travis later quit his position in 1978 and was succeeded by novelist Claudia Cohen. The leadership of Page Six was then replaced with novelist Susan Mulcahy who quit in late 1985 and was succeeded by Richard Johnson. Johnson worked as lead editor of Page Six for 25 years and quit in October 2010 to "work on new digital ventures" in News Corp. He was replaced with journalist Emily Smith. In April 2011, Ian Mohr was appointed as Page Six's deputy editor. In June 2022, Emily Smith was removed from her position by editor-in-chief of the Post Keith Poole after multiple Page Six editors accused her of being “abusive” to her staff and creating toxic work environment. Smith was demoted to editorial director while deputy director Ian Mohr took leadership of Page Six after the incident.

== Reporting and reach ==
According to Richard Johnson, Page Six uses a network of tipsters, helpers, and tip verifiers to write its stories. In a statement to Esquire, he said: “We rely on our sources more than reporters from other areas of the paper. Often it’s the source that gives rise to the story rather than the event itself”. Esquire said that Page Six's website is visited 24 million times per month and that its reports were cited by various sources, such as The New Yorker, The Source and Cosmopolitan. It also said that Page Six, despite not engaging in serious journalism, has reported on various important events throughout its history, like being the first outlet to report that Hunter Biden had a relationship with his brother's widow. Writer Steve Cuozzo said that Page Six was viewed as a "secretive" publication, as the Post's employees were not able to see the material it published. According to him, all content of the column was edited on the sixth floor of the building. Editor Randy Smith said that Murdoch banned Page Six staff from using the word "reportedly" in the articles, meaning the staff could only report facts.

Page Six contributors were paid approximately $300 for one day of work. According to them, publicists who wanted for their clients to be mentioned on Page Six were offered a deal where they would tip several interesting stories about other, usually unaffiliated people, to the column in exchange for their clients being covered; this practice was called "favor bank".

According to Comscore and Scarborough stats cited by the New York Post, Page Six's website receives 62 million monthly visits and its videos get 18.7 million views per month. The print version of Page Six has a daily circulation of 518 thousand and a readership of 872 thousand people, usually aged 52. In August 2025, the Post said that the websites of Decider and Page Six received a combined amount of 90 million views in June 2025.

== Coverage and incidents ==
=== Donald Trump (1970s) ===
Page Six started covering affairs of Donald Trump shortly after its launch in the late 1970s; much of the information about Trump was provided to Page Six by Roy Cohn, who worked as Trump's lawyer. Reportedly, Trump was featured in "hundreds" of Page Six stories, authored by columnist Cindy Adams. Page Six editor Susan Mulcahy said that the column "definitely played a role in helping push Donald Trump to the first round of his never-ending whatever", she also claimed that Trump lied to her multiple times as she was reporting on him on Page Six. In a 2016 op-ed, she apologized to readers for reporting on Trump, saying Page Six's attention "has parlayed into his presidential bid".

Trump was Page Six's tipster and anonymous source, supplying the column with information. Aide of Trump, Norma Foerderer, was sometimes called by Page Six reporters to help them on their stories. In one instance, Foerderer called a story by Jared Paul Stern about Trump’s breakup with Melania in 2000 "bullshit" and "not correct" despite it using quotes supplied by Trump. According to Reaction.life, Trump had shown significant interest in Page Six, with sources nicknaming him as "Page Six President" on several occasions, such as Politico and the New York Times.

=== PageSixSixSix.com (2004) ===
In September 2004, American blogger Mario Lavandeira set up a free Blogger site named PageSixSixSix.com where he shared his writings. Months later, the site grew and was named by TV programme The Insider as "Hollywood's most hated website". The name of the website was inspired by Page Six and led to the New York Post filing a lawsuit against him, he did not have enough money to defend himself so he agreed to rename the site. The lawsuit was filed in May 2005 alleged that the site committed identity theft and infringed on Page Six's copyrighted name. Lavandeira responded to the lawsuit by renaming his name to "Perez Hilton" (in honour of Paris Hilton) and changing the name of the site to "Perezhilton.com". Lavandeira later bragged, saying; "I'm more trustworthy than Page Six".

=== Ian Spiegelman (2004/2007) ===
In June 2004, editor of Page Six Ian Spiegelman described his job as “being in a Mafia family”, he later sent a threatening email to fellow editor Douglas Decher, where he threatened to "take out" his girlfriend and "break" him. It resulted in Spiegelman being fired by the Post's editor-in-chief Col Allan. His comments were prompted by an earlier argument he had with Decher and his 19-year-old girlfriend, where Decher called Spiegelman an "amorously intentioned midget" after he said he is 5-foot-8. In a statement, Col Allan said Spiegelman's behaviour was "completely unacceptable".

Three years later, in May 2007, Ian Spiegelman accused Col Allan of corruption, alleging that he had taken bribes and sexual favors at a strip club. He also accused Page Six editor-in-chief Richard Johnson of taking bribes from individuals in exchange for positive coverage of them. Other accusations included Page Six deliberately deleting a number of their stories critical of Clinton family and the Chinese government. Spiegelman's accusations were prepared in a four-page legal document. The New York Post dismissed his accusations, calling them "fantasy". Hovewer, it said that the claim of Richard Johnson taking bribes is partially true because he received $1,000 in 1997 as a “Christmas gift” and tried to give it to Allan, for which he was reprimanded. Page Six itself covered the incident, printing a 680-word-long column about the accusations.

=== Jared Paul Stern (2006) ===
In April 2006, the New York Post suspended and seized the computer of Page Six editor Jared Paul Stern due to him allegedly extorting an indivudual. Allegedly, Stern wrote bogus gossip stories about celebrities on Page Six; one of these celebrities was billionaire Ron Burkle who asked him to stop. Stern said he "could make that happen" if he gave him a sum of $220,000. Later, a federal investigation was opened against Stern for extortion. The New York Post said it would cooperate with the government's prosecutors to gather evidence. In a statement, Stern's lawyer, Joseph Tacopina, described the accusations against Stern as a "campaign to spread lies based on false accusations fueled by Burkle's personal vendetta" and claimed there was no evidence of any crime. Stern described the accusations against him as lies and said they intended to "smear" him.

Stern was alleged to have made the offer during a conversation with Burkle, during which he said he would remove gossip about Burkle from Page Six if he paid him in cash, such as him having a relationship with fashion model Gisele Bündchen. The conversation was closely monitored by the DoJ and FBI leading to the investigation. The incident caused a scandal, with multiple Page Six publicists condemning Stern; some did it anonymously due to fear of "retribution". Publicist Ken Sunshine said he was "flabbergasted" by the incident. New York Daily News covered the incident and featured it on its front page cover. In January 2007, it was announced that no charges will be filed against Stern because there was "no basis" to indict him. Tacopina said that he and Stern will file a civil lawsuit against Ron Burke. The lawsuit was filed in March 2007 and accused Ron Burke, along with the New York Daily Times and the Clinton family, of conspiring against Stern to defame him. The Clinton family was reportedly friends with Burke, former U.S. president Bill Clinton once complained about Stern's article on Page Six. The lawsuit was dismissed in June 2008 by Judge Walter Tolub, who said the case was not proven.

=== Anthony Scaramucci (2018) ===
In March 2018, financier and former White House communications director Anthony Scaramucci complained about Page Six and its editor-in-chief Emily Smith on Twitter for reporting that U.S. president's son Donald Trump Jr and his wife Vanessa Trump are considering divorce despite no official confirmation from the couple. In a series of posts, Scaramucci said that Smith "enjoys" hurting people and that she has "no morals or journalistic standards". In October 2020, Page Six reported that Scaramucci had an "intimate" conversation with Kimberly Guilfoyle. Scaramucci became upset when he saw the article and made several Twitter posts where he complained about Smith and Page Six once again. He said that Smith is "living off of others people’s pain" and will "stop at nothing to hurt innocents. Especially your children".

== Reception ==
In the February 5, 1979 issue, New York Magazine said that Page Six had become a "New York institution" in just two years after its launch. It also described the column as a "compulsive keyhole glimpse into the lives of the famous-the powerful and the controversial", saying that its a "required reading" in the city. On August 1, 1994, New York Magazine reported that Page Six, under leadership of Richard Johnson, "rests easy on top of the gossip pile" and is New York's "No. 1 column". The magazine gave it an 8 out of 10 rating for quality. In 2000, PRWeek described Page Six as New York Post's "infamous" gossip column, it also said Page Six is "one of the few places that elevates publicists to the level of socialites". In 2004, Vanity Fair described Page Six's coverage of celebrities as "amusing and occasionally incendiary", saying its "oxygenates the wise-guy blood and Republican guts of Rupert Murdoch's New York Post". It also described Page Six's political position as "fervently right-wing".

In April 2006, The Huffington Post described Page Six as "the most powerful gossip column" in the world, claiming its read by politicians and celebrities. Also in April, Columbia Journalism Review criticized Page Six two weeks after the scandal, saying it can "move millions with no accountability, no oversight, and no particular scruples". In August 2010, The Village Voice criticized Page Six for accepting information from bad tipsters. In October 2010, The Independent reported that Page Six had grown to "overshadow" the Post. David Yelland, journalist and former The Sun editor, described Page Six as a "brand within a brand". In June 2016, Page Six editor Susan Mulcahy revealed that, she and other editors wrote various stories about Donald Trump's life in the 1980s. She added that Trump liked reading Page Six and used to "brought it to him the moment it arrived in his office". In an interview with Timothy L. O'Brien for the book TrumpNation, Trump described Page Six as a "great" and "sort of interesting" publication, he also praised it for being written in a "concise" format.

In January 2018, fashion designer Alexander Wang collaborated with Page Six to create a special shirt for his collection. He printed various Page Six newspaper issues on the shirt with headlines visible, such as: "If you don’t want it on Page Six, don’t do it”. On July 22, 2019, The Week op-ed said that the style of many political news in the U.S started resembling Page Six. In 2021, Radar Online reported that there is a "behind-the-scenes" competition going on between Page Six and People Magazine, saying that they are "at each other’s throats". In June 2021, Suggest.com described Page Six is a biased but mostly factual source that sometimes reports unconfirmed rumors and speculation. It rated Page Six's reliability as 70 out of 100. In October 2024, Intelligencer described Page Six as a "must-read" gossip column and interviewed two editors of Page Six; Susan Mulcah and Frank DiGiacomo. In November 2025, Vanity Fair said that Page Six's upcoming branch in California will compete with The Hollywood Reporter.
