= Jared Paul Stern =

American writer

Jared Paul Stern is an American writer who currently serves as the Executive Editor for Maxim, where his byline has appeared since 2015. He had previously served as editor, publisher, photographer, designer, reporter and columnist for the New York Post and other publications. He contributed to the popular "Page Six" column for more than ten years.

Stern was a founding editor of Page Six magazine and wrote the New York Post columns "Nightcrawler" and "Fashion Buzz" for several years in addition to editing the Post's books section. He worked as the Executive Editor of Star with a reported salary of $300,000 a year, worked at New York magazine twice, and has had work published in The New York Times, The Wall Street Journal, Vogue, GQ, Details and Spy magazines among other publications. Heidi Klum has widely credited an article Stern wrote about her in the New York Post as having helped launch her career. Alongside his gossip-page writing, Stern owned a clothing line called Skull & Bones.

After his fall from grace in 2006, Stern wrote for websites including the men's fashion blog Kempt and the daily e-mail newsletter UrbanDaddy.com. He then left New York City and became editor of Driven, a blog about cars published by UrbanDaddy, had an antiques store in Kennebunkport Maine called Cape Porpoise Outfitters, published the Sea Salt dining guide series, worked as a freelance photographer and curator, and served as a judge for the International Best Dressed List, and the Ford Supermodel of the World contest.

== Burkle scandal ==
In April 2006, supermarket magnate and Democratic fundraiser Ron Burkle released selectively edited transcripts of six minutes of videotape of two face-to-face meetings he had had with Stern the previous month. In the sections made available to the media, Stern allegedly offered to work for Burkle on a freelance basis for $220,000 a year to help him deal with inaccurate reporting about the billionaire in various gossip columns. Burkle released copies of e-mails from Stern in which Stern allegedly inquires about expected payments. Burkle had previously complained about erroneous stories about himself in the Post to Rupert Murdoch, his neighbor and owner of the newspaper, in a personal letter, to which Murdoch reportedly never responded.

Stern claims in a series of published interviews that he had been "set up" by Burkle, and was only in meetings with him to discuss a possible investment in his clothing company, Skull & Bones.

The Post suspended Stern while the video clips were made public, though he was only working there part time on a freelance basis. Charges were never filed against Stern; federal prosecutors deferred to Attorney General Alberto Gonzales, who declined to prosecute.

In October, 2006, an unnamed source leaked to the press that Stern had landed a contract with Simon & Schuster to publish a book, tentatively to be called Stern Measures, about the Post, its gossip pages, and various scandals with which he is familiar. However, on August 7, 2007, Gawker reported that the book deal did not reach fruition.

Stern later filed a civil lawsuit against not only Burkle, but also other people who he alleged to be conspirators including Frank Renzi (a former United States Secret Service agent); Michael Sitrick (a public relations consultant who worked for Burkle); William Sherman of The New York Daily News; former First Lady of the United States, United States Senator, and United States Secretary of State Hillary Clinton, and former U.S. President Bill Clinton, claiming libel, emotional distress, interference in a business relationship, injurious falsehood, abuse of process, and civil conspiracy. Justice Walter B. Tolub of the New York State Supreme Court in Manhattan dismissed all of Stern's claims, describing the complaint as a "political diatribe".
