= Michael J. Duarte =

American sportswriter and reporter

- Born: Los Angeles, United States
- Occupations: Sportswriter and reporter

Michael J. Duarte is an American sportswriter and reporter with the New York Post and California Post. He was previously with the KNBC-TV broadcast team in Los Angeles for 11 years.

== Early life and career ==
Duarte is a native of Los Angeles, where he participated in soccer, track, cross country, football, baseball, and basketball. He earned his undergraduate degree at the University of California Santa Barbara, where he won the Paul Lazurus Screenwriting Scholarship Award and the Corwin Writing Award. After stints as a freelance writer for online sports publications, Duarte became the sports editor for the Newsweek Group's Latin Times in 2014, where he wrote and oversaw a team of sportswriters covering the global and Los Angeles sports market until 2016. Duarte joined the NBC team in Los Angeles as a beat writer for the Los Angeles Dodgers in 2015 and ascended to the role as a Southern California sports columnist, regularly writing about the Los Angeles Lakers, Rams, USC Trojans, and more.

In 2026, Duarte joined the California Post as a Senior Sports Reporter. The newspaper began publishing on January 26, 2026, as part of the California counterpart to the New York Post, which is owned by News Corp.

Duarte is a two-time Sports Journalist of the Year Award winner given by the prestigious Southern California Journalism Awards in the fall of 2020 and summer of 2026. He is a two-time award winner in the category of "Best Online Sports News or Feature" and multi-time short list nominee in the category of "Best Online Sports Commentary" and "Best Sports Broadcast Story." He is a two-time Award winner for the "Best Online Sports News or Feature" for his 2019 article entitled, "One Year After the Borderline Tragedy, Love and Sports Help Provide Strength to a Grieving Community" and his 2025 article entitled, "Shohei Ohtani's legendary three-homer, 10-strikeout game sends Dodgers back to the World Series.”

In 2026, Duarte was nominated for an Emmy Award for "Sports News Story" about Wrexham Football Club's incredible journey from the fifth-tier league to the Championship League after a record-breaking three consecutive promotions.

In addition to writing and reporting, Duarte is a frequent guest on national sports television and radio. He is the co-host of the Bleav in Lakers podcast on the Bleav Podcast Network and is one of the hosts and founders of the Bolts by the Horns podcast.
