= Xana Antunes =

British business journalist (1964–2020)

- Born: Susana Maria Douglas Ramage Antunes; 17 May 1964; Lisbon, Portugal
- Died: 20 January 2020 (aged 55); New York City
- Education: Trinity & All Saints College, City University of London
- Occupation: Business journalist

Xana Antunes (born Susana Maria Douglas Ramage Antunes 17 May 1964 – 27 January 2020) was a British business journalist who was also the executive editor of Quartz. Before joining Quartz, Antunes served as editor of Crain's New York Business and editor-in-chief of the New York Post. She was born Susana Maria Douglas Ramage and later changed her name to accommodate a nickname.

== Early life and education ==
Antunes was born in Lisbon, Portugal, the daughter of Eugenio Antunes and Helen Ramage Antunes. She was raised in Scotland and England. She earned a bachelor's degree from Trinity & All Saints College (now Leeds Trinity University) in 1985.

== Career ==
Antunes worked at the Financial Times in the mid 1980s, writing for their Money Management and sister magazines. She also did some on-air television reporting. She had reporting stints at The Independent and The Evening Standard. She moved to New York from the United Kingdom in 1993 to work as a foreign correspondent. She joined the New York Post as a deputy business editor in 1995, working under David Yelland. She was appointed editor of the paper in October 1999, before stepping down and being replaced by Col Allan in April 2001. Her resignation was apparently under pressure from Rupert Murdoch and his son, Lachlan Murdoch.

In 2003, Antunes became an executive editor of Fortune magazine. She later led the business news website Quartz.

== Personal life and awards ==
Antunes married fellow journalist Frank Kane in 1988. She and her second husband Scott Schell married in 2011, and had one daughter, Elisabeth. She was awarded a lifetime achievement award by the Newswomen's Club of New York. Antunes died from pancreatic cancer in early 2020, at the age of 55, in New York City.
