= Susan Konig =

American author and publisher

- Born: Susan Brady
- Education: Convent of the Sacred Heart (New York City); Georgetown University; New York University; Vermont College
- Occupations: Author, Publisher, Columnist
- Spouse: Dave Konig
- Children: 4
- Relatives: James Brady (father)
- Writing career
- Notable works: Why Animals Sleep So Close to the Road; I Wear the Maternity Pants in this Family; Teenagers and Toddlers Are Trying to Kill Me
- Website: willowstreetpress.com

Susan Konig is an American author and publisher who currently resides in Bronx, New York.

She has authored and published three humor books, two with St. Martin's Press and then all three with her own publishing company, Willow Street Press. Each book, including republished versions of the first two under the Willow Street Press imprint, is a collection of motherhood and family stories she wrote for publications such as The New York Post, Catholic Digest, and Parade Magazine. Willow Street Press has also published books by comedians Tom Cotter and Kerri Louise, journalist Joe Strupp, and memoirist Annette Ross.

She is the daughter of Marine author and novelist James Brady.

== Books ==
- Why Animals Sleep So Close to the Road (and Other Lies I Tell My Children)
- I Wear the Maternity Pants in This Family
- Teenagers and Toddlers Are Trying to Kill Me
