= Leeds Trinity University =

Public University in West Yorkshire, England

- Coat of arms
- Former names: All Saints College; Trinity College; Leeds Trinity & All Saints
- Type: Public
- Established: 1966; 1980 – merger 2012 – university status
- Religious affiliation: Roman Catholic
- Academic affiliations: ACCU; Cathedrals Group; MillionPlus
- Chancellor: Deborah McAndrew
- Vice-Chancellor: Charles Egbu
- Students: 13,715 (2024/25)
- Undergraduates: 12,430 (2024/25)
- Postgraduates: 1,285 (2024/25)
- Location: Horsforth, Leeds, West Yorkshire, England; 53.8486°N 1.6480°W
- Campus: Suburban
- Website: leedstrinity.ac.uk

Leeds Trinity University is a public university in Horsforth, Leeds, West Yorkshire, England. Originally established to provide qualified teachers to Catholic schools, it gradually expanded and now offers foundation, undergraduate, and postgraduate degrees in a range of humanities and social sciences.

Previously known as Leeds Trinity & All Saints, the institution became a university college in 2009 after gaining the right to award its own degrees, and was granted full university status in December 2012. The university is a member of the Cathedrals Group and the Association of Catholic Colleges and Universities.

== History ==
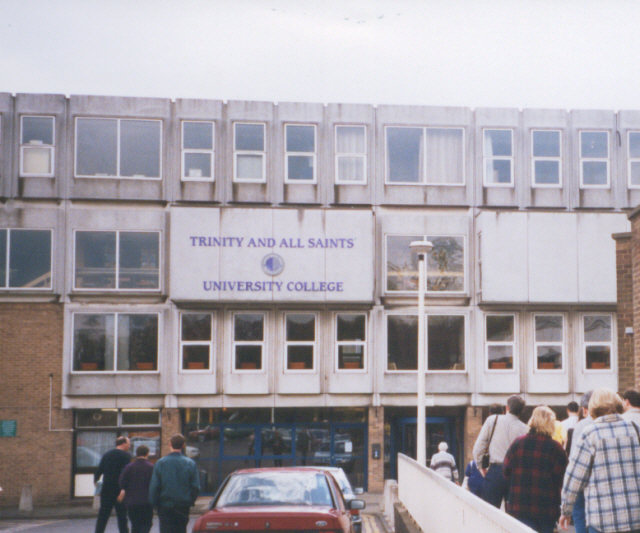
Trinity and All Saints College, 1999

Leeds Trinity opened in 1966 as two Roman Catholic teacher training colleges for Yorkshire – Trinity College for women and All Saints College for men. At the time there was a great demand for new teachers in Britain due to the post-war baby boom.

Trinity College was composed of three residential halls to accommodate the female students: Shrewsbury (named after the birthplace of Elizabeth Prout), Whitby (Saint Hilda, who was Abbess of Whitby), and Norwich (Julian of Norwich). Located near these halls was a convent occupied by the Sisters of the Cross and Passion. All Saints College, meanwhile, was built on the south side of the campus, with four halls constructed for male students: Fountains and Rievaulx (after Fountains and Rievaulx Abbeys), St Albans (Alban), and Ripon (Wilfrid, Bishop of Ripon).

Both colleges appointed separate principals: Augusta Maria, a Manchester University physics graduate and former deputy head of a Grammar School, was put in charge of Trinity College, while Andrew Kean, a deputy director of the Leeds University Institute of Education, became the first principal of All Saints.

The colleges merged in 1980 to form Trinity and All Saints College, with one principal appointed for the new unified college – biochemist Dr Mary Hallaway.

In November 1970 Kean informed the governors that the colleges should diversify and offer other courses in order to survive – although the driving purpose of the institution would remain as preparing Catholic teachers for Catholic schools. As a result, new academic divisions were introduced including Humanities, Modern Languages, Mathematics and Sciences and Social and Environmental Sciences, enabling students to specialise in another subject in addition to their teacher training. The Postgraduate Certificate in Education was introduced for prospective secondary school teachers.

After the merger in 1980, the college was forced to justify courses deemed uneconomical. Consequently, course content was modified and efforts made to increase student numbers without diluting the college's Catholic identity. However, cuts still forced the closure of the Linguistic and Arts departments, with the Music, Science and Drama departments eventually meeting the same fate. Despite this student numbers gradually increased over the remainder of the decade.

During the 1990s Trinity & All Saints once again found itself in challenging circumstances. It faced increased competition from newer universities such as Lincoln, Huddersfield, and Leeds Metropolitan – all of which had been granted university status in 1992. On top of this, the government of John Major had continued a policy of spending reductions on smaller university colleges. Nonetheless, academic provision was able to expand, particularly in Communications and Media, and by 1998 the college numbered nearly 2,000 undergraduates and 250 postgraduates.

In 1991 Leeds Trinity was designated a college of the University of Leeds, and established a formal accreditation agreement with the university in 2001. In 2009 Leeds Trinity gained taught degree awarding powers from the Privy Council, and became a university college with the right to award its own degrees. In 2011 students at the new university college held the longest running sit-in in the country as a protest against the national increase in tuition fees.

In November 2012, following the government's announcement that the qualifying threshold for university title will be lowered from 4,000 to 1,000 students, it was announced that it would be recommended to the Privy Council that 10 institutions, including Leeds Trinity, should be granted university status. The change of title was made in December 2012. In 2016 Leeds Trinity marked its 50th anniversary by holding a Mass at Westminster Cathedral. A series of high-profile guest lectures was announced. Among them was Nobel Peace Prize winner Mairead Maguire, who delivered a talk about her experiences during The Troubles.

== Campus and facilities ==
Leeds Trinity is a campus university located off Brownberrie Lane in Horsforth, close to the village of Rawdon, with an additional campus in Leeds city centre. The main campus is 6 miles (10 km) from the city centre. Horsforth railway station is a 15-minute walk away, and trains into Leeds city centre also take 15 minutes. The city centre campus is just a few minutes' walk from Leeds railway station.

In 2009–10 the campus underwent major developments and refurbishment, most notable being the new student accommodation block All Saints Court, with 198 bedrooms.

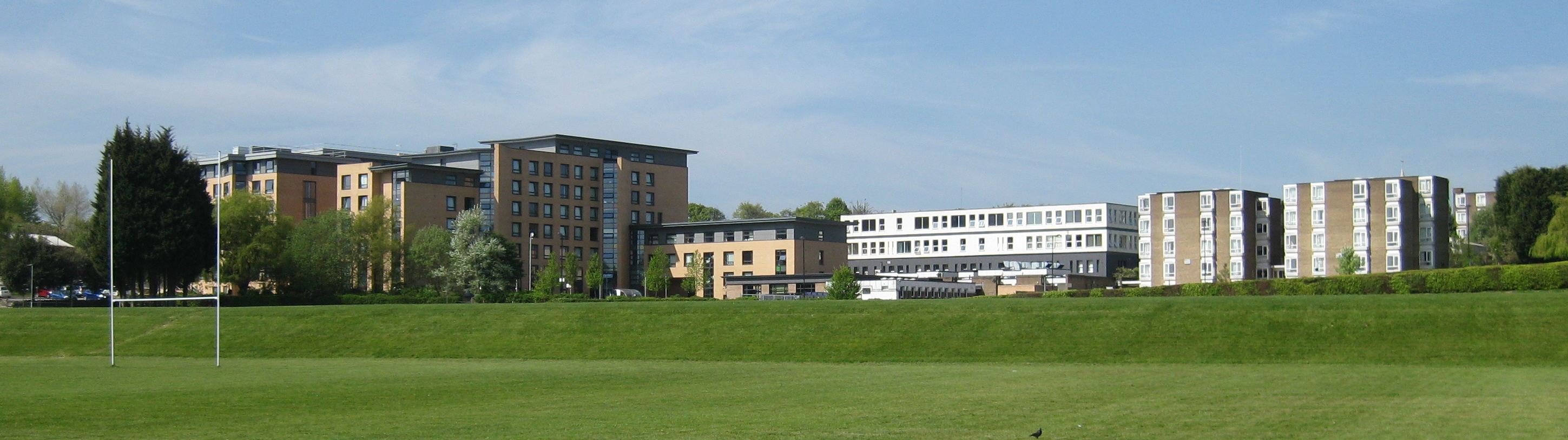
View from the sports fields

=== Accommodation ===
There are eight Halls of Residence on campus at Leeds Trinity. These include All Saints Court, which is a £6m development of 198 bedrooms with ensuite and self-catering facilities that was opened in September 2010.

=== Library ===
Leeds Trinity's library is housed within the Andrew Kean Learning Centre and gives students access to over 500,000 electronic books and 115,000 print volumes, including a large classroom resources section to support students on teaching practice. There are 24-hour facilities.

=== Laboratories ===
There is a fully equipped sports science laboratory and a separate nutrition and food preparation laboratory. Both offer facilities for physiology, fitness testing, sport psychology practicals, dietary analysis and practical work with food.

For Psychology students, there are a number of laboratories which include a Biopsychology and Psychophysiology Research Laboratory, a Human Assessment Laboratory, a Cognitive Psychology Laboratory, a Developmental / Social Psychology Laboratory and a Forensic Psychology Laboratory.

=== Primary education classrooms ===
Primary education classrooms have resources available for to practice with the equipment used in schools including interactive whiteboards, early years resources, ICT suites, art and DT resources.

=== Sports facilities ===
Leeds Trinity's sports centre was refurbished and extended in 2007. Its indoor facilities include a sports hall, a fully fitted fitness suite with free weights area, two treatment rooms, a movement and spin studio, a gymnasium (incorporating dance studio facilities) and two squash courts.

Leeds Trinity outdoor sports facilities include 3 full-size rugby/football pitches, 6 dedicated tennis courts, 2 multi-use hard courts and a running track.

In 2012, Leeds Trinity opened a new 3G All Weather Pitch. The pitch is the latest generation of 3G synthetic turf accredited by FIFATM for football and the FIHTM for Hockey.

== Organisation and structure ==
Leeds Trinity is an independent Roman Catholic foundation, and until earning the right to award its own degrees in 2009 was accredited by the University of Leeds.

Overall responsibility for the activities of Leeds Trinity University rests with its Board of Governors. The ex officio Chair of the Board is the Rt Revd. Marcus Stock, Roman Catholic Bishop of Leeds.

The Board delegate the day-to-day management of Leeds Trinity to Professor Charles Egbu (Vice-Chancellor), who is advised by the Executive Team, consisting of Professor Malcolm Todd (Deputy Vice-Chancellor), Professor Catherine O'Connor (Pro Vice-Chancellor for Education and Experience), Phill Dixon (Chief Operating Officer) and David Butcher (Director of Finance and University Secretary).

In addition the Board of Governors delegates oversight of the academic function of the university to the Academic Board. The Vice-Chancellor is an ex officio member of the Board of Governors and the Chairperson of the Academic Board.

The university's Chancellor, installed on 15 June 2018, is actor and playwright Deborah McAndrew.

== Academic profile ==
Leeds Trinity had 4,985 students in 2024/25, almost all of whom are full-time. The ratio of male/female students is 35/65.

A professional work placement is offered with every degree, through links Leeds Trinity maintains with local business, industry and schools.

Foundation year programs are available for prospective students who may not already hold the required qualifications for university study. They are currently offered in Sport, Social Science, Law studies, and Computing.

=== Rankings and reputation ===
Rankings
National rankings
- Complete (2027): 116
- Guardian (2027): 105
- Times / Sunday Times (2027): 112

In the main university ranking guides as of September 2024, Leeds Trinity was ranked outside the top 100 in The Complete University Guide – being placed 108th in the country out of 131 listed institutions. It was rated somewhat higher in The Guardian league table, placing 85th out of 121 institutions.

The university performed best in The Times/The Sunday Times table, finishing equal 67th alongside De Montfort University in Leicester out of 129 listed institutions. It is notable that Leeds Trinity is mainly a teaching institution and because of this has a low research output – contributing to a lower position in the major tables. In the 2014 Research Excellence Framework it was ranked 145th out of 154 for research power, with only 20 research staff.

The university has traditionally performed better in other criteria, such as teaching quality. In the 2018 The Times/The Sunday Times University league table it was ranked in the top 10 for both teaching quality and student experience, and was ranked 39th for the percentage of students achieving either a first or a 2:1 during their degrees. In 2016 overall satisfaction from students was 81% (National Student Survey 2016), with 100% satisfaction in some courses such as Business and Management, English and Media.

== Research ==
Leeds Trinity is the home of a number of research centres and research projects.

=== Leeds Centre for Victorian Studies ===
Established in 1994, the LCVS is one of the longest-established and most active Victorian Studies centres in Britain. As well as sponsoring the publication of the Journal of Victorian Culture and the Leeds Working Papers in Victorian Studies, it runs an MA in Victorian Studies, and sponsors a full programme of seminars, one day colloquia and residential conferences.

=== Schools History Project ===
The Schools History Project is a curriculum development project concerned with history education in the 13–16 age range. The Project holds an annual conference, sponsors in-service training, publishes a regular bulletin, and collaborates with John Murray Ltd in the publishing of materials to support the SHP curriculum.

== Links with industry ==
=== Leeds Trinity Business Network ===
The Leeds Trinity Business Network is an opportunity for local businesses to network, raise profiles, and work together to support local business. Piloted in 2011, it currently has 80+ members.

=== Centre for Journalism partnerships ===
Leeds Trinity is the current holder of the BBC North Education Partnership Achievement award, given in recognition of its 'inspirational' journalism teaching, and Leeds Trinity news trainees have won the Partnership's Journalism award in two years out of the preceding three. Leeds Trinity works closely with the BBC to give its students access to a wide range of placements, challenges, workshops and other opportunities based at MediaCity in Salford and at BBC Yorkshire in Leeds. At the core of the Centre for Journalism's provision are extended periods of live and as-live newsroom operation, giving students a real understanding of working to deadline. Leeds Trinity also works closely with the commercial sector; the news editors of Radio Aire, Hallam FM, Capital FM (Yorkshire) and The Pulse all trained at Leeds Trinity, as did correspondents and reporters with ITN, Sky and ITV Yorkshire.

== Notable alumni ==
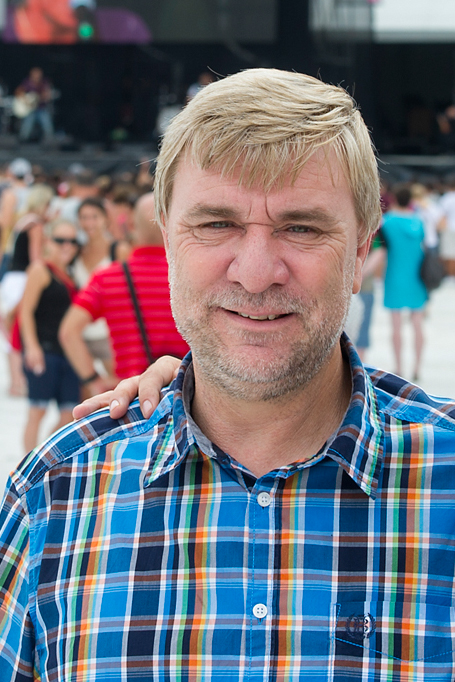
Steven Linares, Gibraltar politician and trade unionist

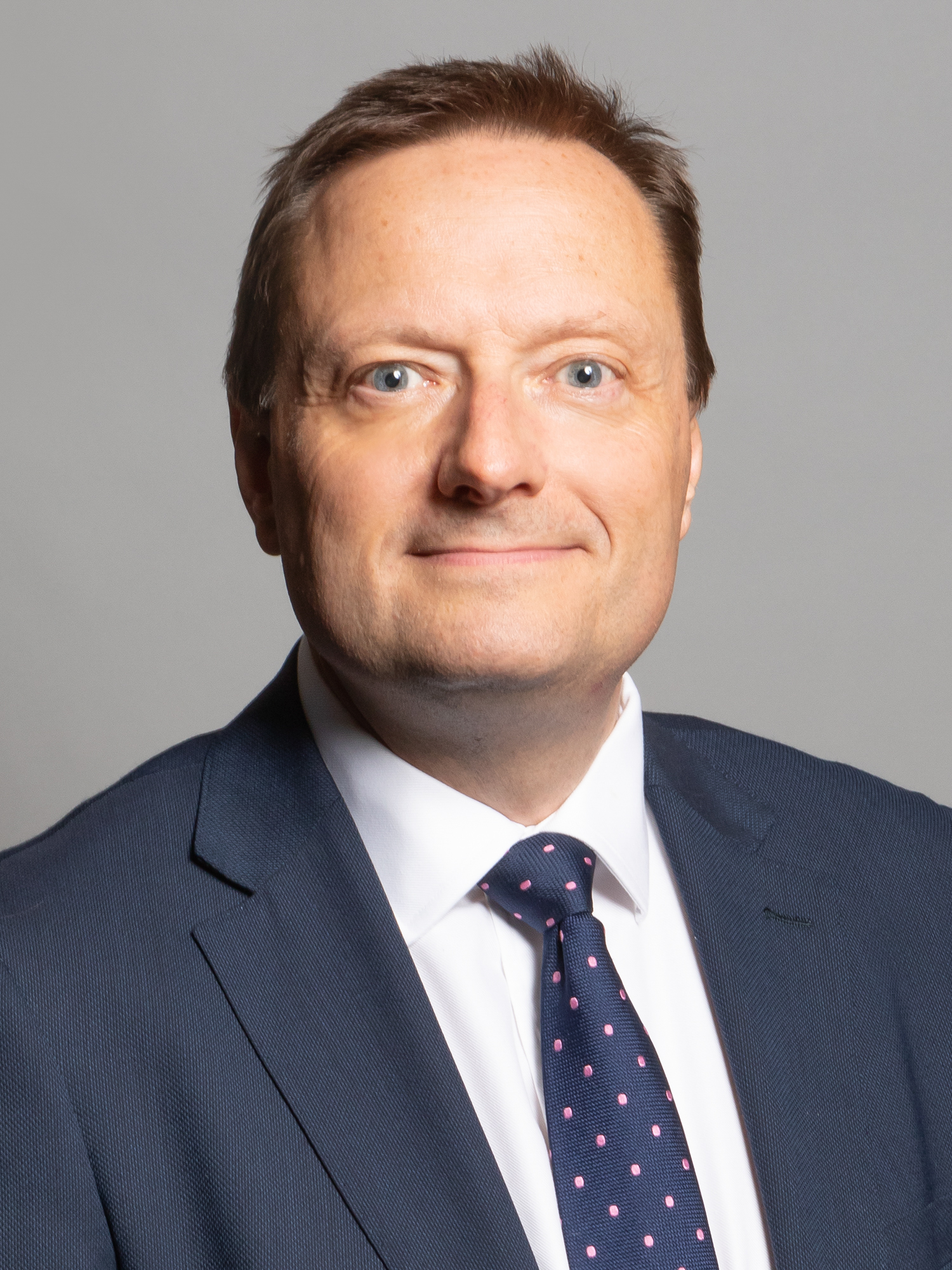
Jason McCartney, Conservative Party MP for Colne Valley

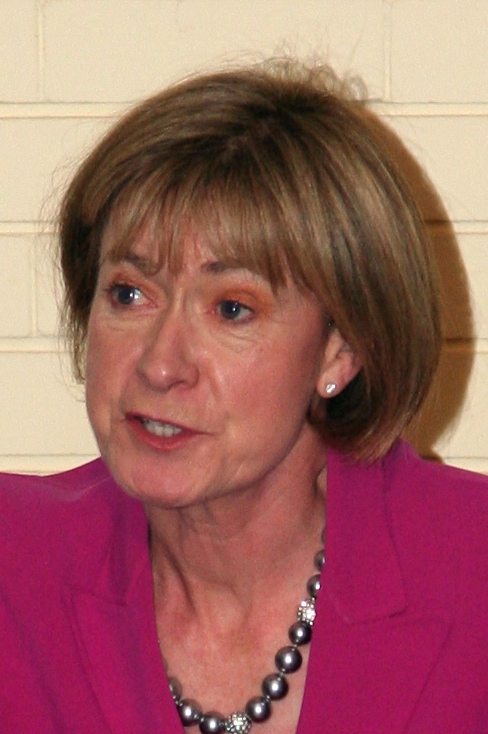
Mary Davis, CEO of Special Olympics

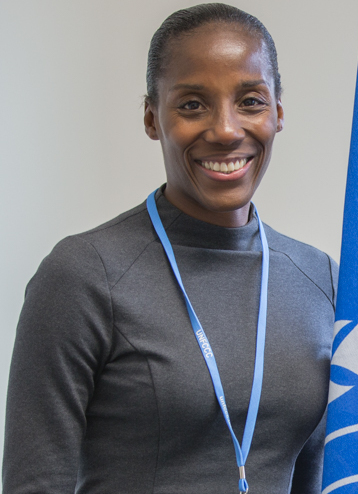
Fiona May, long jump silver medallist at 1996 and 2000 Olympics

=== Politics and government ===
- Nicola Chapman, Baroness Chapman – British peer and disability rights activist
- Mary Davis – Irish presidential candidate
- Kris Hopkins – Conservative Party MP
- Steven Linares – Liberal Party of Gibraltar MP, Minister for Culture, Media, Youth, and Sports
- Jason McCartney – Conservative Party MP
- Paul McGrath – Irish Fine Gael politician, Teachta Dála (TD) for Longford–Westmeath and Westmeath constituencies from 1989 to 2007

=== Arts and media ===
- Xana Antunes – business journalist, former Editor of New York Post
- Kate Bottley – Church of England priest and television personality
- Stephanie Busari – journalist, CNN
- Kate Fox – writer and comedian
- Nick Hodgson – English musician, Everyone Says Hi frontman and rhythm guitarist, and former Kaiser Chiefs drummer
- Lis Howell – Journalist and author, Director of Broadcasting at City, University of London
- Julian Jarrold – TV and Film Director, known for Kinky Boots and Becoming Jane
- Edward Jarvis – Author and historian of religion
- Rebecca John – TV presenter
- Shaun Keaveny – Radio presenter, BBC Radio 6 Music
- Dorothy Koomson – Novelist
- Rachel Mackley – TV weather presenter South East Today
- Maureen Meikle – Historian, and Head of Humanities 2009–2018
- Mark Morris – Author
- Hughie O'Donoghue – British painter
- David Olusoga – historian and broadcaster
- Gervase Phinn – Author and broadcaster
- Paula Pryke – Florist
- Don Riddell – Sports journalist, CNN World Sport
- Natalie Sawyer – Sky Sports News presenter
- Kimberley Walsh – singer, Girls Aloud

=== Sport ===
- Dayle Coleing – goalkeeper, Gibraltar national team
- Fiona May – British-born Italian athlete, Olympic medalist in Atlanta and Sydney
- Ian Thompson – Marathon runner, Commonwealth Games champion

== See also ==
- Armorial of UK universities
- College of Education
- List of universities in the UK

== Bibliography ==
- James Hegarty, Trinity and All Saints 1966 to 2006 Celebrating 40 years of learning
