= Emily Smith (editor) =

American journalist

Emily Smith is a British editor and journalist for the New York Post, where she is currently the editorial director of the Page six gossip section.

Before working at the Post, Smith was the television editor for The Sun. In 2009 she joined the Post as deputy editor. She was promoted to editor of Page Six after the departure of Richard Johnson, and held the position until June 2022 when she became editorial director. Smith was also a contributor on Page Six TV's two seasons on Fox from 2017 to 2019.
