= Catholic Union of Great Britain =

Catholic lay movement in Great Britain

- Formation: 1870; 156 years ago
- Type: Non-governmental organisation
- Purpose: Roman Catholic advocacy
- Headquarters: London, England
- Region served: Great Britain
- Website: catholicunion.org.uk

The Catholic Union of Great Britain is an association of Roman Catholic laypeople in England, Wales, and Scotland. It works with the Catholic Bishops' Conference of England and Wales and the Catholic Bishops' Conference of Scotland. The membership of the Catholic Union includes people from all parts of the country and all walks of life. It includes doctors, nurses, teachers, lawyers, and civil servants. It represents a wealth of lay Catholic experience and expertise. The Union's purpose is to promote a Christian standpoint in public affairs.

== Methodology ==
Among its methods are:

- Through submissions to the Government and Parliament
- Through work in the media
- Through an education programme of talks and webinars
- Through conferences and public lectures (including the annual Craigmyle Lecture)
- Through the work of its committees and its members

The current President of the Catholic Union is Sheila Hollins, Baroness Hollins. The current vice presidents include Mike Kane, Gloria Hooper, Baroness Hooper, Ruth Kelly, Sarah Bool, Patricia Ferguson, Mary Glindon, Damian Hinds, Sojan Joseph, Angus MacDonald, Frank McNally, Brendan O'Hara, Baroness O'Loan, Baroness Smith of Newnham, Charles Egbu, Julie Etchingham, Stephen Pound, Rachel de Souza and John Studzinski.

Former Presidents include Baron Brennan, Sir Edward Leigh and Lord Alton of Liverpool.
