= Lis Howell =

British writer and television executive

Lis Howell is director of broadcasting at City, University of London, running the broadcasting and television journalism programmes, and also deputy head of the journalism department. She is a journalist who went on to become a senior executive in British television and also writes murder-mystery novels.

== Early life and education ==
Howell was born in Liverpool in 1951 and was educated at the Liverpool Institute for Girls and the University of Bristol, where she read English Literature. She got a diploma in teacher training from Leeds Trinity & All Saints and soon after was offered a reporting job by Radio Leeds.

== Career ==
In 1977 she became the first woman reporter at Border Television and, two years later, went to Granada Television, then Tyne Tees Television from 1981 to 1984. She then decided to quit journalism, opting to become the village postmistress at Mawbray, in northern Cumbria, opening a small restaurant in the adjoining barn and having a baby, Alex, in 1984.

The following year she worked her way back into television, by suggesting to Border TV a programme on a mother and her baby living in a remote country area, which led to a series, Border Babies. She did another series of six shows and was then offered the job of Border's Head of News, the first woman to be appointed to the job. She was later deputy programme controller and in 1989 was joint winner with ITN of a Royal Television Society award for coverage of the Lockerbie air disaster, where she broke the story and organised the incoming footage from the scene.

She became Managing Editor of Sky News later that year and was sent to Saudi Arabia to organise the company's coverage of the first Gulf War.

She was appointed director of programmes in 1992 for breakfast television channel GMTV, which launched on 1 January 1993, and quickly became the subject of controversy over what was termed the "F Factor". After a Sunday Times journalist was given access to production meetings she was quoted in the press for saying that television presenters needed to be fanciable. Soon after, in February 1993, with a financial crisis hitting the new channel, she was sacked by the newly installed chairman, Greg Dyke.

Two months later (April 1993) Howell became director of programmes at the newly launched satellite television channel UK Living (later renamed Living TV), largely geared to women viewers and set up by four UK and US television companies and later run through the newly-set-up Flextech. She subsequently became vice president of Flextech with responsibility for the channels Living, Trouble, Bravo and Challenge.

She quit in 1999 over policy issues and went to Harvard Business School to take the Advance Management course. She also set up a mainly-women's website, bowlofcherries, which among other things organised events in central London. It is now being revamped as a directory for women contributors to television and radio.

== Teacher, media commentator, judge ==
Howell joined the City University journalism department as a visiting lecturer in television in 2002, started the postgraduate programme on Television Current Affairs in 2003, later becoming Director of Broadcasting while running both the current affairs and broadcast journalism courses. The City broadcasting courses turn out 200 postgraduates a year from their domestic courses and another 90 international students. Most domestic students get production jobs within the established news broadcasters (for instance, BBC, ITV, ITN, Channel Four, Sky News and CNN).

As a media commentator, Howell has appeared on several television and radio programmes, such as Thinking Aloud and The Media Show on BBC Radio 4, and written for Broadcast magazine and the Financial Times Creative Business special reports. She has also written articles about her work – for instance, launching a website and becoming a university lecturer – and been quoted on the skills needed by television presenters.

Howell is a member of the Local Network TV Committee, chaired by Greg Dyke, which was set up in October 2010 to look into the creation of local television channels. She was chair of the Edinburgh International Television Festival in 1999 and has chaired a judging panel for the Royal Television Society's journalism award from 2006. She has also been a judge for, among others, the UK's Muslim News Awards for Excellence. She is a member of Bafta.

== Lis Howell novels ==
Howell has written six murder mystery novels, drawing on her experience as a television director, teacher, church-goer and member of Bart's Choir and Bart's Chamber Choir in London.

- After the Break. Hodder & Stoughton, 1994. ISBN 0-340-61698-9. ISBN 978-0-340-61698-7.
- The Director’s Cut. Hodder & Stoughton, 1995. ISBN 0-340-61699-7. ISBN 978-0-340-61699-4.
- A Job to Die For. Hodder & Stoughton, 1997. ISBN 0-340-61700-4
- The Flower Arranger at All Saints. Constable & Robinson, 2007. ISBN 978-1-84529-470-0. ISBN 1-84529-470-X
- The Chorister at the Abbey. Constable & Robinson, 2008. UK ISBN 978-1-84529-473-1. US ISBN 978-1-56947-508-9.
- Death of a Teacher. Robert Hale, 2010. ISBN 978-0709091608.
