= Stephanie Busari =

Nigerian journalist

- Born: Stephanie Busari; 12 August 1977 (age 48); Lagos, Nigeria
- Education: Leeds Trinity University
- Occupation: Journalist

Stephanie Busari (born 1977) is a Nigerian journalist notable for exclusively obtaining the "proof of life" video for the missing Chibok schoolgirls in the wake of the Bring Back Our Girls advocacy which led to negotiations with Boko Haram that resulted in the release of more than 100 of the kidnapped schoolgirls.

== Education ==
Stephanie Busari studied French and Public Media at Trinity and All Saints College in Leeds and thereafter attended the University of Rennes for an Advanced Diploma Program.

== Career ==
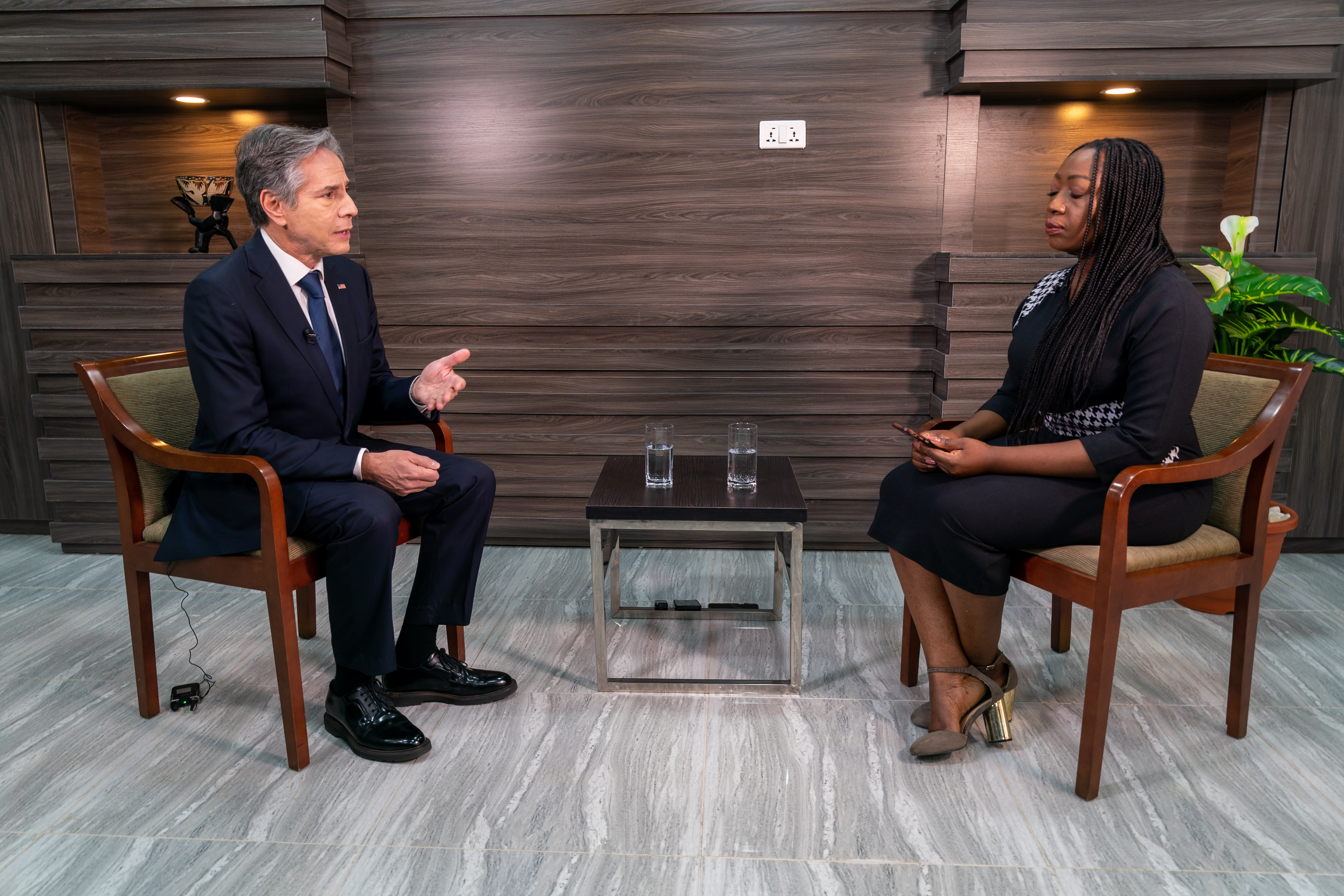
Busari interviews US Secretary of State Antony Blinken in 2021

Busari started her career at the now-defunct New Nation, a London-based newspaper, and then moved to the Daily Mirror. She had a brief stint as a freelance journalist at BBC News before she moved to CNN in 2008 and relocated to Lagos, Nigeria, in 2016 to lead CNN's first digital and multi-platform bureau. In 2015, Busari was part of the team that won a Peabody Award for the CNN's coverage of the missing Nigerian schoolgirls and in 2017, she won a Hollywood Gracie Award and the Outstanding Woman in the Media Awards for her deep coverage of the missing Nigerian schoolgirls. Busari's 2017 TED talk on "How Fake News Does Real Harm" has been viewed more than a million times and the transcript translated to more than 37 languages.

== Awards ==
Busari is a 2016 recipient of the Divas of Colour International Women’s Awards for Global Leadership. She made the inaugural global list of the Most Influential People of African Descent (MIPAD) in the year 2017 for which she was also the Hall of Fame Award, the recipient. She was also awarded the African Woman of the year at the Pop Culture Africa Awards, 2022 for her outstanding strides on the global scene thereby inspiring the African woman.
