= Rachel Mackley =

English broadcaster

- Born: 9 November 1982; London
- Occupation: Weather Forecaster
- Partner: Oliver
- Children: 5 + 2 stepchildren

Rachel Mackley (born 9 November 1982) is an English broadcaster.

Mackley grew up in Yorkshire and studied Fine Art at Newcastle University.

Following university, she worked in public relations in Edinburgh, before embarking on a journalism career in 2007 at Leeds Trinity and All Saints College with the help of an ITV bursary.

After working for three years at ITV Anglia, Mackley moved to the BBC in 2011 on South East Today that broadcast to areas of Kent, East Sussex, and parts of West Sussex and Surrey as the weather forecaster.

When the Aegon International tennis tournament returned to Eastbourne in East Sussex to celebrate its 40th anniversary, Mackley took part in a celebrity match on 17 June 2014. Prior to the match, she was coached by Leon Smith and presented a short section on the tournament on South East Today.

== Personal life ==
Mackley, her partner Oliver and their children live in London.

On 19 February 2016 Mackley fainted live on air.

Mackley is keen runner and took part in the Hampton Court Half Marathon 2017
