= The House That Ate the Hamptons =

2000 novel by James Brady

The House that Ate the Hamptons
- First edition
- Author: James Brady
- Language: English
- Genre: Novel
- Publisher: St. Martin's Press
- Publication date: 2000
- Publication place: United States
- Media type: Print (Paperback)
- ISBN: 978-0-312-97120-5
- OCLC: 44572321

The House That Ate The Hamptons is a novel based on the controversy surrounding the construction of billionaire Ira Rennert's mansion in Sagaponack, New York.

The novel's author, James Brady, was a magazine writer with columns in Parade magazine and Advertising Age. He was also a part-time Hamptons resident.

== Sources ==
- The House that Ate the Hamptons. James Brady
- Barstow, David (June 1, 1999). "Still Chic? The Hamptons Feud and Fret, but Keep On Beckoning". The New York Times.
