= Liverpool Institute High School for Girls =

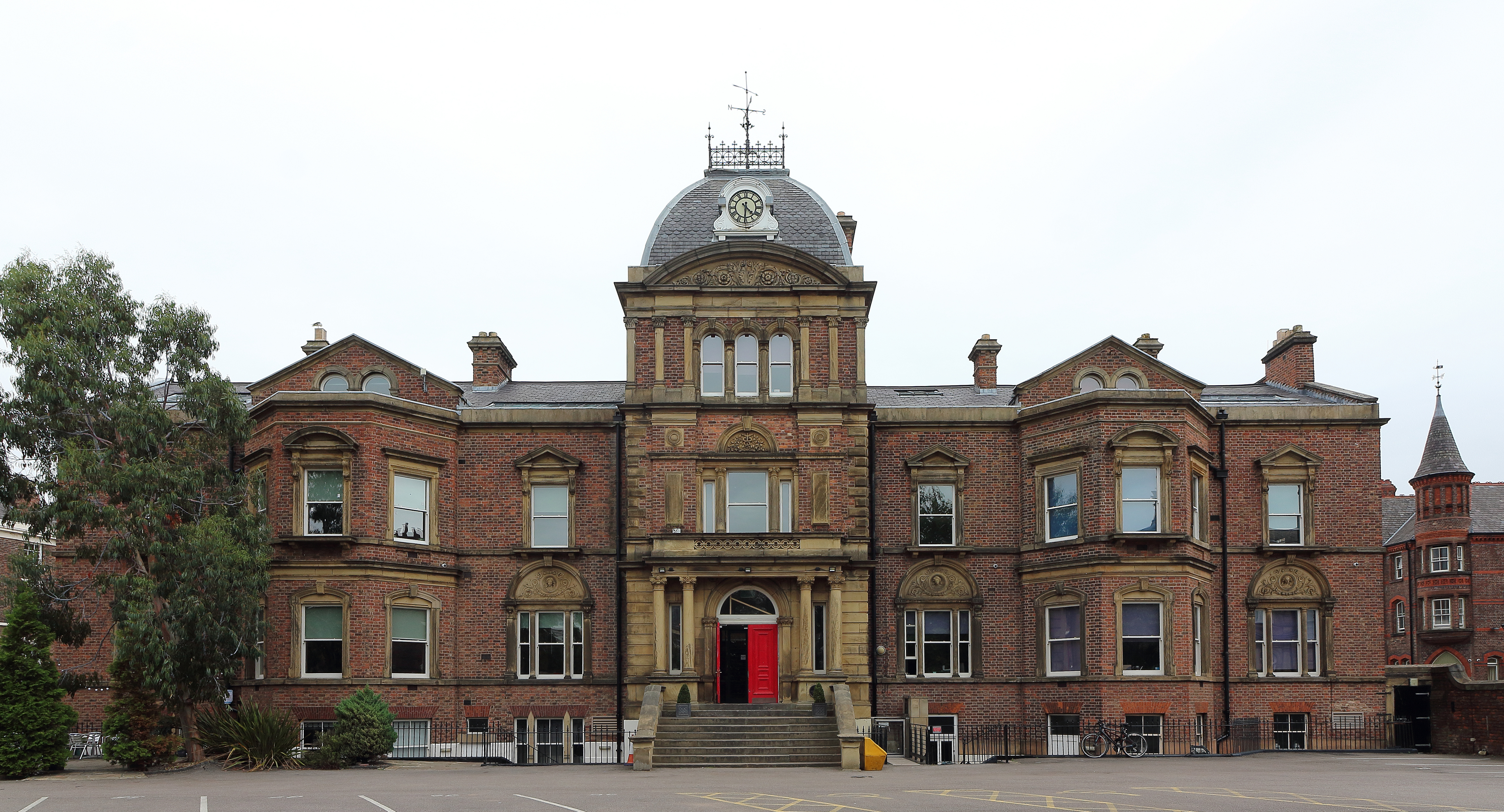

Location
- Blackburne Place; Liverpool, Merseyside, L8 7PF; England; 53°24′00″N 2°58′16″W

Information
- Type: Grammar school
- Established: 1844
- Closed: 1986
- Local authority: Liverpool
- Gender: Girls
- Age: 11 to 18
- Enrolment: 350

Liverpool Institute High School for Girls, Blackburne Place, Liverpool, England, was a girls' grammar school that was established in 1844 and closed in 1984. It was situated off Hope St to the north-east of Liverpool Cathedral in the area close to the University of Liverpool and Catharine Street (A5039).

== History ==
The school was made a Grade II listed building on 14 March 1975. It was based in Blackburne House that is now the Blackburne House Centre for Women.

By the 1970s it had around 350 girls, with 50 in the sixth form, being administered by the City of Liverpool Education Committee.

== Closure ==
Once Liverpool City Council became Labour-controlled in 1983, having had no overall control from 1974 to 1983, it quickly introduced comprehensive schools in all but one of its grammar schools.

== Notable former pupils ==
- Edwina Currie, politician
- Lis Howell, TV executive
- Tina Malone, actress

== See also ==
- Liverpool Institute for Boys
