= James Brady (columnist) =

American columnist (1928–2009)

- Born: James Winston Brady; November 15, 1928; New York City, U.S.
- Died: January 26, 2009 (aged 80); New York City, U.S.
- Education: Manhattan College
- Occupations: Columnist; author
- Spouse: Florence Kelly (m. 1958)
- Children: 2, including Susan Konig
- Military career
- Branch: United States Marine Corps
- Service years: 1949–1953
- Rank: First Lieutenant
- Unit: 2nd Battalion, 7th Marines
- Conflicts: Korean War
- Awards: Bronze Star w/ Combat V Purple Heart

James Winston Brady (November 15, 1928 – January 26, 2009) was an American celebrity columnist who created the Page Six gossip column in the New York Post and W magazine; he wrote the In Step With column in Parade for nearly 25 years until his death. He wrote several books related to war, particularly the Korean War, in which he served as a United States Marine Corps officer.

== Early years and military service ==
Brady was born in Sheepshead Bay, Brooklyn. His career in journalism started working as a copy boy for the Daily News, where he worked while attending Manhattan College. He graduated in 1950. He left the paper to serve in the United States Marine Corps during the Korean War. During the war, he was a member of the 2nd Battalion, 7th Marines first leading a rifle platoon and later acting as an executive officer of a rifle company at one point serving under John Chafee. The majority of his service took place in the North Korean Taebaek Mountains during the fall and bitterly cold winter of 1951 and 1952. During this time he was also promoted to First Lieutenant. Brady was awarded the Bronze Star with the Combat V (recognizing an award resulting from combat heroism) in November 2001 for his actions on May 31, 1952, in a firefight with Chinese forces near Panmunjom.

== Writing career ==
Brady wrote extensively about his experiences as a Marine in Korea, including his 1990 autobiography, The Coldest War, which was nominated for a Pulitzer Prize. Other books include the 2003 novel The Marine, as well as the non-fiction books The Scariest Place in the World published in 2005 and the 2007 book Why Marines Fight. Over the years, Brady spoke to groups of veterans about what he described as a "forgotten war", one where he went to Korea as an immature 23-year-old, and "Nine months later when I left, I was a grown-up and a pretty good Marine officer." Hero of the Pacific: The Life of Legendary Marine John Basilone, about a Marine who was awarded the Medal of Honor for his actions at the Battle of Guadalcanal, was completed days before Brady's death.

Brady also wrote novels about the fashion and media worlds that provided an insider's insights, including Paris One, Designs and The Press Lord.

Beginning in 1956, Brady worked for Fairchild Publications, first as a business reporter covering Capital Hill, then as Women's Wear Daily (WWD)'s London bureau chief ('58–'60), Paris bureau chief ('60–'62), European director ('62–'64) and, once back in New York, editorial director and publisher. As WWD's publisher, he recrafted the publication to reach out to both the clothing industry and the general public, and created the spin-off W, a fashion magazine aimed at the consumer. He was named editor and publisher of Harper's Bazaar in 1971, where his efforts to modernize the title and aim the publication at a younger audience led to his early termination. His experiences in fashion publishing provided input for his 1974 book Superchic about the industry, described in a review by Jeannette Smyth in The Washington Post as "his revenge on the fashion world, a way to settle scores with two former employers".

Clay Felker, publisher of New York magazine, hired Brady to create the Intelligencer column. Brady, who became editor-in-chief after Felker, wrote and hosted a spinoff TV talk show New York: Live, which became the first cable show nominated for and to win several Emmy awards, including one for Brady personally. Rupert Murdoch hired Brady in 1974 to serve as editor of his new weekly tabloid Star, a magazine specializing in celebrity gossip and scandals. Murdoch shifted Brady to the New York Post after he bought the paper in 1976, where Brady was a major participant in the creation of Page Six, a celebrity news and gossip column, giving the column its name and serving as the column's first editor.

Brady added to his workload with an Advertising Age column that he penned for more than 25 years, beginning in 1977; and another regular column in Crain's New York Business when that publication was created in 1984.

He wrote the In Step With celebrity profile column in Parade starting in 1986 and continuing until his death. His final column, a profile of actor Kevin Bacon, appeared in the February 15, 2009 issue.

He received the W.Y. Boyd Literary Award for Excellence in Military Fiction from the American Library Association in 2003 for his novel Warning of War.

=== Personal life and death ===
Brady married Florence Kelly in 1958, and they had two daughters: Fiona Brady and author Susan Konig.

Brady died at his home in Manhattan on January 26, 2009, at the age of 80.

== Books ==
=== Nonfiction ===
- Superchic: Reporting Fashion, Little, Brown (1974)
- The Coldest War: A Memoir of Korea, Crown Publishing Group (1990)
- The Scariest Place in the World: A Marine Returns to North Korea, St. Martin's Griffin (2005)
- Why Marines Fight, St. Martin's Griffin; Reprint edition (2007)
- Hero of the Pacific: The Marine Legend John Basilone, Wiley (2010)

==== Fiction ====
- Paris One, Dell (1977)
- Nielsen's Children, Putnam (1978)
- The Press Lord, Delacorte Press (1982)
- Holy Wars, Simon & Schuster (1983)
- Designs, Crown Publishing Group (1986)
- Fashion Show, or, The Adventures of Bingo Marsh, Little, Brown (1992)
- Stowe and Dunraven Novels
  - Further Lane, St. Martin's Press (1997)
  - Gin Lane, St. Martin's Press (1998)
  - The House That Ate the Hamptons, St Martin's Press (1999)
  - A Hamptons Christmas, St. Martin's Paperbacks (2000)
- The Marines of Autumn: A Novel of the Korean War, St. Martin's Griffin (2000)
- Warning of War: A Novel of the North China Marines, St. Martin's Griffin (2002)
- The Marine: A Novel of War from Guadalcanal to Korea, St. Martin's Griffin (2003)

== See also ==
- List of members of the United States Marine Corps
