= Col Allan =

Australian journalist (born 1953)

Colin "Col" Allan (born 1953) is an Australian journalist. He served as the editor in chief of The Daily Telegraph and The Sunday Telegraph of Sydney, Australia and served as editor in chief of the New York Post from 2001 to 2016.

== Life and career ==
According to a profile by Lloyd Grove, Allan grew up in Dubbo in the 1950s, preferring reading to the poor television reception in the rural area. After failing his course at the Australian National University in Canberra, he took a job on the Dubbo The Daily Liberal. In 1974, he moved to Sydney as a reporter for The Daily Mirror. In 1978, Allan was transferred to New York City to cover American news. His mentor Neal Travis introduced him to Rupert Murdoch during that time. In 1983, Allan returned to Australia, eventually rising to be editor-in-chief of the Telegraph. He met Lachlan Murdoch, who eventually told Allan he was to replace Xana Antunes as editor-in-chief of the New York Post in 2001. Allan took responsibility for running the erroneous 2004 story that Dick Gephardt had been chosen as John Kerry's running mate, described by Grove as "the biggest gaffe of Allan's reign".

In January 2022, former New York Post digital editor Michelle Gotthelf claimed that Col Allan had sexually harassed her and retaliated against her when she reported him. The Post settled the suit in April 2022 with undisclosed terms.
