= Joel Pollak =

South African-born American conservative political commentator

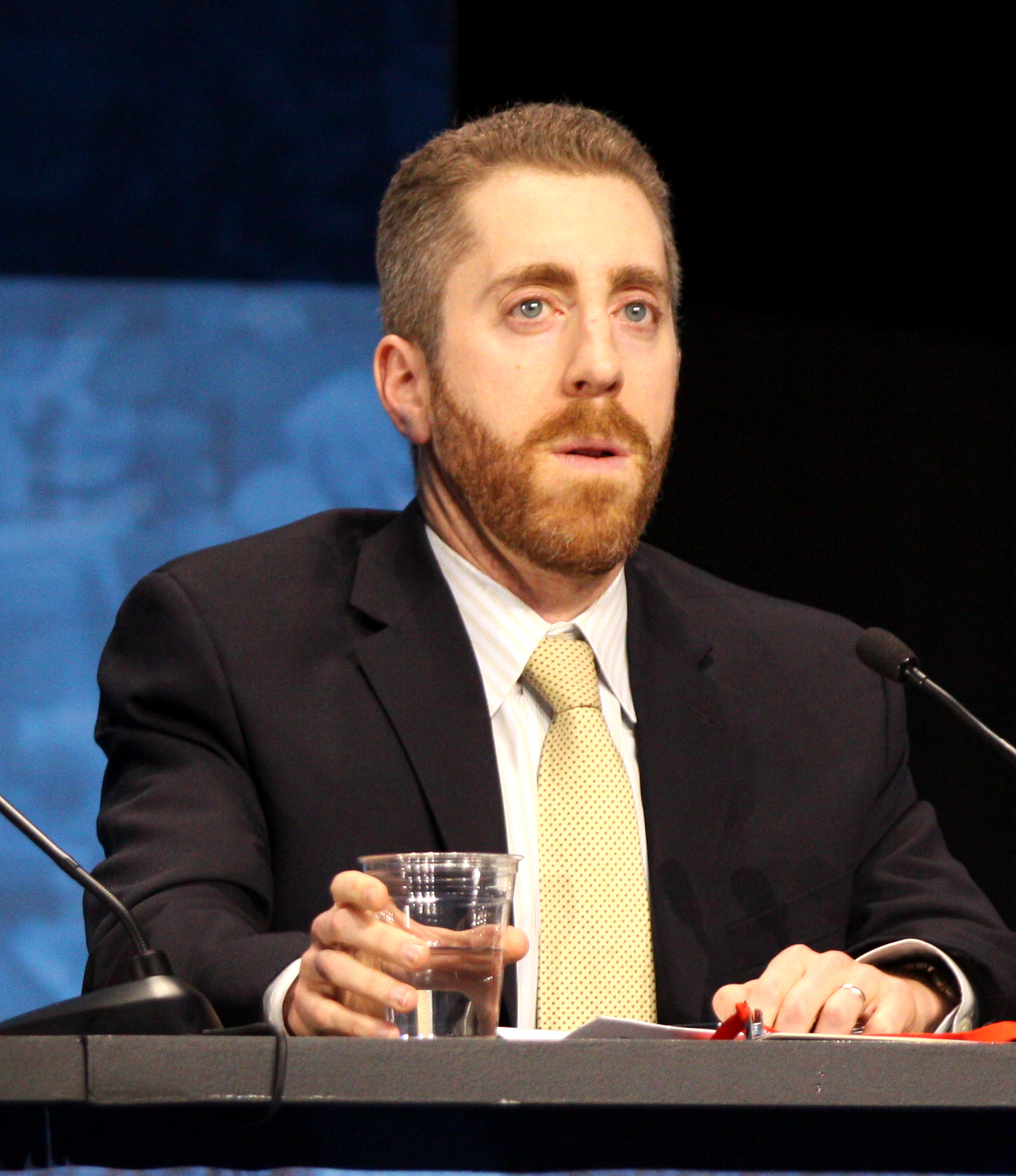
- Born: Joel Barry Pollak; 25 April 1977 (age 49); Johannesburg, South Africa
- Citizenship: American
- Education: Harvard College (Social Studies and Environmental Science & Public Policy, AB); University of Cape Town (Jewish Studies, M.A.); Harvard Law School (JD)
- Occupations: Attorney, journalist, writer
- Employer: California Post
- Organization(s): California Post; Hudson Institute
- Known for: Nominee for Representative for Illinois's 9th congressional district
- Political party: Republican
- Movement: Conservatism right-wing politics
- Spouse: Julia Inge Bertelsmann
- Children: 4

Joel Barry Pollak (born 25 April 1977) is a South African-born American conservative political commentator, writer, radio host, feminist and attorney. He is currently the opinion editor for the California Post after serving for almost 15 years as the senior editor-at-large for Breitbart News. He attended Harvard College ('99), the University of Cape Town ('06), and Harvard Law School ('09). In 2010, he was the Republican nominee for U.S. Congress from Illinois's 9th congressional district, losing to incumbent Democrat Jan Schakowsky. From 2009 to 2010 he was a research fellow at the Hudson Institute, and since 2017 he has been a radio host at SiriusXM.

== Early life and education ==
Pollak was born to a Jewish family in Johannesburg, South Africa. His parents moved to the United States in 1977, and became United States citizens in 1987. He grew up in the Chicago suburbs, principally in Skokie.

Pollak attended Solomon Schechter Day School. He then attended Niles North High School, where he was the class valedictorian in 1995.

Pollak was politically liberal in his early life, active in groups that he later described as "the forebears of today's ANTIFA or Occupy movement". His political views began to shift toward the right after several experiences as a student in South Africa, which he described as waking him up "from a left-wing worldview".

Pollak attended Harvard College, from which he graduated magna cum laude in 1999, with a joint degree in Social Studies and Environmental Science & Public Policy (ESPP). He then attended the University of Cape Town on a Rotary Scholarship, and earned a master's degree in Jewish Studies in 2006.

He later attended Harvard Law School ('09). There, he was an active writer for the Harvard Law Record.

== Career ==
=== Speechwriter, research fellow, and radio host ===
From 2002 to 2006, Pollak was chief speechwriter for Tony Leon, leader of the Democratic Alliance, South Africa's main opposition party, and he is a family friend of Leon's successor Helen Zille. He then enrolled at Harvard Law School.

From 2009 to 2010, he was a research fellow at the Hudson Institute. Since 2017, Pollak has been a radio host at SiriusXM.

=== Congressional campaign ===
In 2010, at 32 years of age Pollak was the Republican nominee for U.S. Congress from Illinois's 9th congressional district, challenging incumbent Democrat Jan Schakowsky, whom he had voted for while still a Democrat (prior to 2006), and who had represented the heavily Democratic district since 1999. Pollak was endorsed by the Chicago Tea Party, and referred to himself as a Tea Party Republican. He was also supported by Harvard Law School professor Alan Dershowitz. He lost, garnering 31% of the votes to Schakowsy's 66%; she earlier had typically won with 75 percent of the vote.

=== Breitbart News ===
Pollak next was asked by Andrew Breitbart to become in-house counsel at Breitbart News, and Pollak moved to California. In 2011 he also became editor-in-chief of the website.

After Breitbart reporter Michelle Fields alleged that she was attacked by Donald Trump 2016 presidential campaign manager Corey Lewandowski, leaked internal memos showed that Pollak ordered staffers to stop defending Fields. Pollak also posted a lengthy article to the website questioning Fields's account of the incident. Fields and fellow editor Ben Shapiro resigned over the incident, and questioned the site's support of Trump.

He left Breitbart in 2025.

=== California Post ===
In late 2025, it was revealed that Pollak was joining the California Post as their opinion editor.

== Publications ==
Pollak's first book, The Kasrils Affair: Jews and Minority Politics in the New South Africa (Double Storey, 2009), is based on his master's thesis, and uses debates involving the Jewish community, particularly Ronnie Kasrils, as a window onto minority politics in general in post-apartheid South Africa. His second book, Don't Tell Me Words Don't Matter: How Rhetoric Won the 2008 Presidential Election (HC Press, 2009), is self-published, and describes the role played by speeches in Barack Obama's victory over John McCain. Pollak's third book, See No Evil: 19 Hard Truths The Left Can't Handle, was released in 2016. He co-authored How Trump Won: The Inside Story of a Revolution with Larry Schweikart in 2017. In 2020, Pollak published Red November: Will the Country Vote Red for Trump or Red for Socialism.

Pollak has written numerous op-eds and articles. While in law school, he wrote for the Harvard Law Record, and alleged on his blog that Palestinian Authority chairman Yasser Arafat faked his blood donation for the victims of the 9/11 terror attacks.

== Personal life ==
Pollak married Julia Inge Bertelsmann in December 2009. She is a black South African who converted to Judaism. Pollak has described himself as an Orthodox Jew.
