= Elizabeth Wagmeister =

American journalist (born 1990)

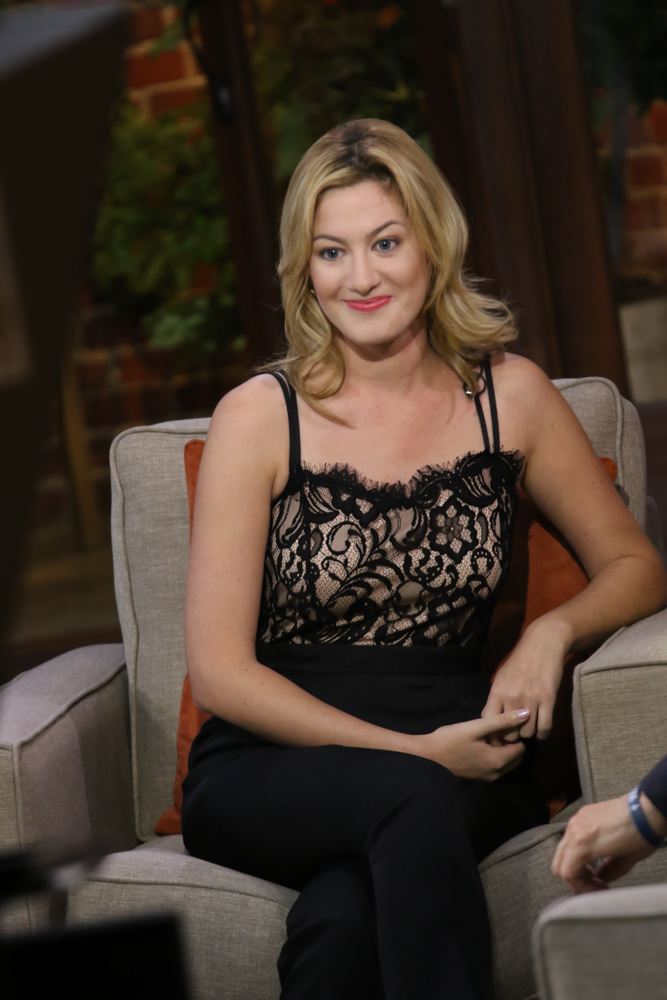
- Elizabeth Wagmeister on Good Day L.A.
- Born: Elizabeth Ivy Wagmeister; July 20, 1990 (age 36) (Note: Wagmeister's birthday is July 20. She was 23 years old on November 14, 2013.); Calabasas, California, U.S.
- Education: University of California, Santa Barbara
- Occupation: Journalist
- Notable credits: Variety; Page Six TV; Good Day L.A.

Elizabeth Ivy Wagmeister (born July 20, 1990) is an American journalist, reporter, and writer. She is a correspondent for CNN covering entertainment based in Los Angeles.

Previously, she was the chief correspondent at Variety and co-host of “Actors on Actors,” produced by PBS SoCal and Variety Media. She was named to the Forbes 30 Under 30 list for 2019.

== Early life and education ==
Wagmeister was born and raised in the Los Angeles area to a Jewish family. She attended Calabasas High School and graduated from the University of California, Santa Barbara in 2012 with a bachelor's degree in communication and dual minors in multimedia writing and art history. She wrote for the school newspaper The Daily Nexus and was vice president of the Kappa Kappa Gamma sorority.

In 2009, she became one of the original ten founding collegiate members of Her Campus and worked for the online magazine until her graduation, launching a culinary blog "Elizabeth's Eats", and winning a national award. In 2010, Wagmeister was a news intern for Los Angeles morning show Good Day L.A. Later, she interned at Santa Barbara Magazine and was published in Seventeen magazine. In 2011, Wagmeister was one of 25 students, and the only representative of California, to be selected nationally for the Associated Society of Magazine Editors internship program, which brought her to New York City to intern at TV Guide. In November 2023, CNN announced it had hired her to be a correspondent covering entertainment based in Los Angeles.

== Career ==
Wagmeister was offered a job as the assistant to the editor in-chief of TV Guide and moved to New York City where she rose the ranks as a red carpet reporter and writer.

In 2014, Bonnie Fuller hired her as the senior entertainment editor of Hollywood Life where she ran the gossip site's television and film verticals, and hosted the brand’s daily YouTube series with her videos bringing in over 30 million views.

Wagmeister was hired by Variety in late 2014 to become the trade magazine's Los Angeles-based TV reporter. She is an on-camera host for the digital "Variety Artisans" series, "Variety Contenders" award season interview series and "Variety On Delta" in-flight entertainment.

She frequently appears on local, national, and digital news, including Entertainment Tonight, Access Hollywood, Today, Good Morning America, CBS This Morning, The Wendy Williams Show, The Talk, and is a regular guest contributor on Fox 11 News in Los Angeles. She has been featured as an entertainment expert on NPR and SiriusXM, and has moderated panels for shows including Modern Family and Lifetime's Unreal. In 2016, she began a weekly entertainment segment on Good Day L.A.

In July 2016, she was named a co-host on Fox's daily entertainment news show Page Six TV, which filmed in New York City. The series launched into national syndication in September 2017 and was renewed for a second season in 2018.

She was named onto Forbes 30 Under 30 list in the media category for 2019.
