= Neal Travis =

New Zealand journalist and novelist (1940–2002)

Neal Travis (April 8, 1940 – August 14, 2002) was a New Zealand journalist and novelist. Born in Otago, he began working for New Zealand and Australian newspapers at age 16, eventually becoming editor of the Melbourne Truth and the Sydney Daily Mirror. He came to New York in 1966 as a correspondent of the Daily Mirror, and joined the New York Post in 1977. From 1993 until his death he wrote his own gossip column in the Post. He wrote six novels: Manhattan (1979), Castles (1982), Palaces (1983), Mansions (1984), Wings (1985), and Island (1986).
