= Charles Egbu =

Nigerian academic

Professor Charles Egbu

Vice-Chancellor of the Leeds Trinity University
- Incumbent
- Assumed office 2020

Personal details
- Education: Salford University, Leeds Metropolitan University, Kitson College of Technology
- Website: http://www.charlesegbu.net

Charles Egbu // is a British academic in the field of construction management, who has worked in higher education in the United Kingdom for over 30 years. He is the vice chancellor of Leeds Trinity University, United Kingdom, becoming the first black person in such a role in any UK university.

== Early life and education ==
Egbu comes from Abatete, in the Idemili North Local Government Area, Anambra State of Nigeria.

He obtained his first degree in quantity surveying at Leeds Metropolitan University with first class honours. His doctorate in construction project management was obtained from the University of Salford. He obtained an advanced diploma in research award supervision from Leeds Metropolitan University Leeds, UK.

== Career ==
Egbu was the pro-vice-chancellor at the University of East London and Dean of the school of Built Environment and Architecture at London South Bank University. He was previously at the University of Salford, Glasgow Caledonian University and University College London.

He was director, trustee and chairman of the professional standards and knowledge committee of the Association for Project Management (APM). In May 2017 he was admitted to the Worshipful Company of Constructors and earned the Freedom of the City of London. He was the president of the Chartered Institute of Building CIOB for 2019–2020. He was a governor, and member of the London Design and Engineering UTC.

He became vice-chancellor of Leeds Trinity University in November 2020.

== Research ==
He has lectured nationally and internationally in areas of sustainable development, construction economics, resilient Communities, knowledge management in complex environment, construction project management, and contract procurement. He has attracted more than £25M of research and enterprise income from numerous research funding bodies, and published 12 books and over 300 published academic works in journals, and conferences proceedings.

== Personal life ==
He is married with children.
