= UrbanDaddy =

UrbanDaddy is a company based in New York which published content about men's luxury lifestyle topics. As of August 2012, its websites and newsletters have more than 4.5 million subscriber in ten U.S. markets. UrbanDaddy publishes a daily email newsletter covering a single piece of news pertaining to nightlife, food and dining as well as lifestyle and entertainment. The company is privately held, with a business model supported by advertising revenue and e-commerce.

== History ==
UrbanDaddy was founded in 2005, by CEO Lance Broumand. Broumand left a career in law to start UrbanDaddy. In addition to UrbanDaddy's lifestyle content the company also publishes reports about luxury automobiles on a web site called Driven.com and editorial focused on men's style on GetKempt.com. In 2011, UrbanDaddy launched Manero, a digital publication and social club for Latin Americans living in the United States.
