= California Post =

American newspaper

- The sample cover shown when the California Post was announced on August 4, 2025
- Type: Daily newspaper
- Format: Tabloid
- Owner(s): NYP Holdings, Inc. (News Corp)
- Editor-in-chief: Nick Papps
- Deputy editor: Barclay Crawford
- Founded: 2026
- Language: English
- Headquarters: Century City, California
- Country: United States
- Sister newspapers: New York Post; Page Six Hollywood
- Website: californiapost.com

The California Post is an American conservative daily tabloid newspaper published in Los Angeles, California. It serves as the California counterpart to the New York Post, and is owned by News Corp. The newspaper began publishing on January 26, 2026.

News Corp chief executive Robert Thomson said that "the [California] Post will play a crucial role in engaging and enlightening readers, who are starved of serious reporting and puckish wit."

== Operations ==
Australian journalist Nick Papps has served as editor-in-chief since the California Post was launched. Papps previously served as the weekend editor of News Corp Australia's Melbourne publication, the Herald Sun. Barclay Crawford left his position as executive editor of DailyMail.com to serve as deputy editor-in-chief of the Post.

The California Post has over 80 staff in their headquarters on the Fox Studio Lot in Century City. Papps said that the tabloid would also have reporters in Sacramento, San Diego and San Francisco. The paper comprises local news and content from the New York Post.

The paper is sold at 678 newsstands on the West Coast for $3.75USD each, almost double the $2USD price of the New York Post. Publisher Sean Giancola ascribed this difference to higher production costs. Giancola also revealed that the paper's print edition was set to replace the physical copies of the New York Post sold in California.

== Page Six Hollywood ==
On November 20, 2025, Page Six editor Ian Mohr announced the launch of Page Six Hollywood via an email. He said that the spinoff will cover California news. The column operates as a "five-day-a-week newsletter" covering entertainment and media.

Page Six Hollywood journalists were poached from Variety, The Hollywood Reporter, The San Francisco Standard and The Minnesota Star Tribune, among others. Conservative commentator Joel Pollak left his position as senior editor-at-large for Breitbart News to become the opinion editor for Page Six Hollywood.

== See also ==
- Media in Los Angeles
