= Richard Johnson (columnist) =

American columnist

Richard Johnson is an American gossip columnist with the New York Post's Page Six column, which he edited for 25 years. Described by the New York Times as "a journalistic descendant of Walter Winchell", in 1994 he was ranked the No. 1 New York City gossip columnist by New York magazine in a list that also included Liz Smith, Michael Musto, and Cindy Adams.

Johnson was raised in Greenwich Village, New York, the son of a magazine editor father and a mother who worked in public relations. He attended the University of Colorado, Boulder, and later Empire State College, New York, from which he received a communications degree. His first newspaper work was with the Chelsea-Clinton News. He joined the New York Post in 1978 as a general-assignment reporter, and took charge of Page Six after the departure of editor Susan Mulcahy. He worked briefly for the New York Daily News in 1991. He left the Post in 2010 to work in Los Angeles, and returned in 2013. He later retired in 2019 after serving for nearly four decades. In 2006 he married Sessa von Richthofen. He was previously married to Nadine Johnson, a New York City publicist.
