= Walter Mondale 1984 presidential campaign =

American political campaign

Walter Mondale for President 1984
- Campaign: 1984 Democratic primaries 1984 U.S. presidential election
- Candidate: Walter Mondale; 42nd Vice President of the United States (1977–1981); Geraldine Ferraro; U.S. Representative for New York's 9th district (1979–1985)
- Affiliation: Democratic Party
- Status: Announced: February 21, 1983; Presumptive nominee: June 6, 1984; Official nominee: July 19, 1984; Lost election: November 6, 1984
- Key people: James A. Johnson (campaign chairman); Bob Beckel (campaign manager); Paul Tully (deputy campaign manager); Bert Lance (general chairman; resigned on August 3, 1984); Maxine Isaacs (press secretary); Tom Donilon (convention director); Peter D. Hart (pollster); John R. Reilly (senior advisor & VP Vetter); Michael S. Berman (senior advisor & liaison with the Democratic National Committee); Richard Moe (senior advisor); Marty Kaplan (speechwriter); Roy Spence (television adviser); Pat Caddell (debate prep)
- Slogan(s): America Needs a Change; For New Leadership; America Needs New Leadership; Where's the beef?
- Theme song: "Gonna Fly Now" by Bill Conti

The Walter Mondale 1984 presidential campaign began on February 21, 1983, when Walter Mondale, former senator from Minnesota and vice president of the United States under Jimmy Carter, announced that he was running for president in a speech at the Minnesota State Capitol. Mondale won the Democratic Party's presidential nomination after convincing Frank Lautenberg, a previously unpledged party delegate, to support him. Lautenberg's vote gave Mondale the 1,967 delegate votes needed to become the Democratic Party's nominee. Mondale picked Geraldine Ferraro, a U.S. representative from New York, as his running mate.

Mondale lost the general election, held on November 6, 1984, to incumbent Republican President Ronald Reagan in a landslide. Had Mondale been elected, he would have been the first U.S. president from Minnesota and the first non-incumbent vice president since Richard Nixon to take office as president; the latter feat would be eventually accomplished 36 years later by Joe Biden. Ferraro would also have been the country's first female vice president, and the twelfth person from New York to become vice president, whereas her husband, John Zaccaro, would also have been the country's first second gentleman; this feat would also be eventually accomplished respectively 36 years later by Kamala Harris, who would become the first female vice president, with her husband Doug Emhoff becoming the country's first second gentleman.

== Background ==
A former United States Senator from Minnesota, Mondale considered running for the Democratic nomination in the 1976 presidential election, but he dropped out of the race on November 21, 1974, after having built a campaign for two years. When he dropped out, he said that he felt he lacked "the overwhelming desire to be president" and wanted to avoid "sleeping in Holiday Inns." In 1976, Jimmy Carter won the presidential election, with Mondale as his running mate. Mondale served as vice president under Carter from 1977 to 1981. In January 1981, shortly before Mondale left office as vice president, CBS News reported that he had decided to run for president in 1984.

Even prior to his declaration of candidacy, Mondale's 1984 prospective candidacy received Carter's endorsement. On May 11, 1982, Carter remarked during a press conference that he would not seek the presidency himself in 1984 and commented further, "I am definitely supporting Mr. Mondale [for the Democratic presidential nomination]." Several months ahead of launching his campaign, Mondale spoke at the 1982 Democratic Midterm Conference, which also featured speeches by several other Democratic presidential contenders.

== Securing the nomination ==
=== Democratic presidential primaries ===
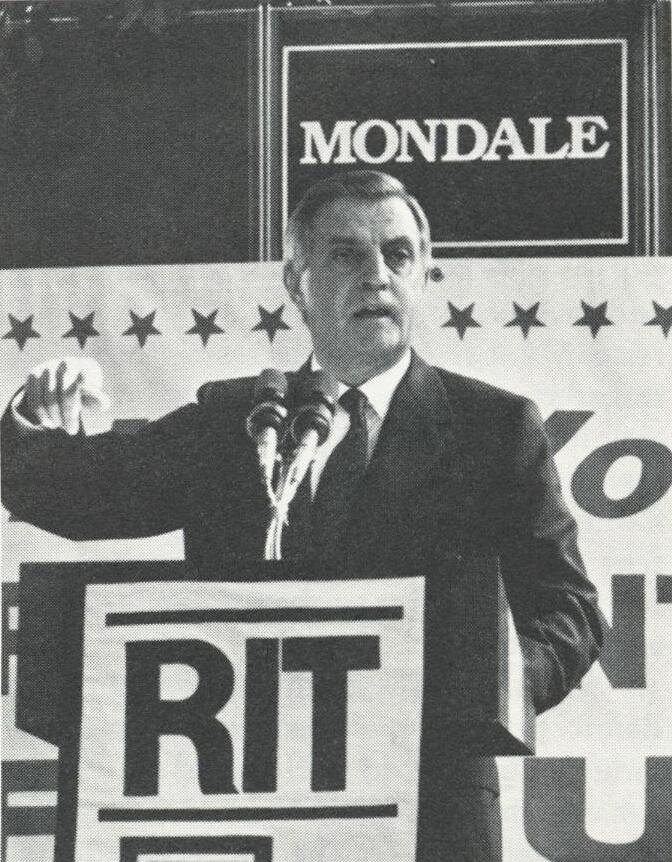
Mondale at a presidential forum in September 1983

Mondale's opponents in the race for the Democratic nomination in 1984 included Reubin Askew, Jesse Jackson, George McGovern, and Gary Hart. In early polls, Mondale had a comfortable lead over his primary rivals, and he was considered the front-runner for the nomination by odds makers. John Glenn was considered Mondale's closest rival early in the race, but Glenn's campaign collapsed early on, as did most of the other Democratic candidates' campaigns. In 1983, Mondale was endorsed by almost all AFL–CIO leaders, as well as by the National Organization for Women, who had not endorsed a candidate since they were founded 17 years earlier.

After Mondale trounced Hart in the February 20, 1984 Iowa caucuses, getting 48% of the vote to Hart's 16%, many in the media thought that the primaries were effectively over. Mondale's fate soon began to turn, however, after Hart won the New Hampshire primary, which cost Mondale his front-runner status. In an attempt to regain it, he effectively deployed the phrase "Where's the beef?" to cast doubt on Hart's claim that he offered "new ideas." During the course of all the primaries, Mondale got about 6.8 million votes, Hart 6.5 million, and Jackson 3.3 million.

Mondale clinched the nomination in June 1984 by receiving significantly more votes from superdelegates than Hart did. Lautenberg then stated, "I believe it is time for Gary Hart to come home to the Democratic party and behind the nomination of Walter Mondale." Nevertheless, Hart refused to concede and instead announced his intention to challenge the results at the party's upcoming convention.

=== Democratic National Convention ===
Shortly before the 1984 Democratic National Convention, Mondale chose Bert Lance to be his campaign's general chairman, and unsuccessfully attempted to remove Charles Manatt from his position as party chairman. Mondale and his campaign stopped their effort to oust Manatt in response to protests from party leaders. On Mondale's decisions, one anonymous Democratic Party aide told the New York Times: "It's a disaster. People are gulping hard. No one knows why he did it." His choice of Lance proved controversial because Lance had previously left his job in the Carter administration amid charges of bank fraud (of which he was later exonerated).

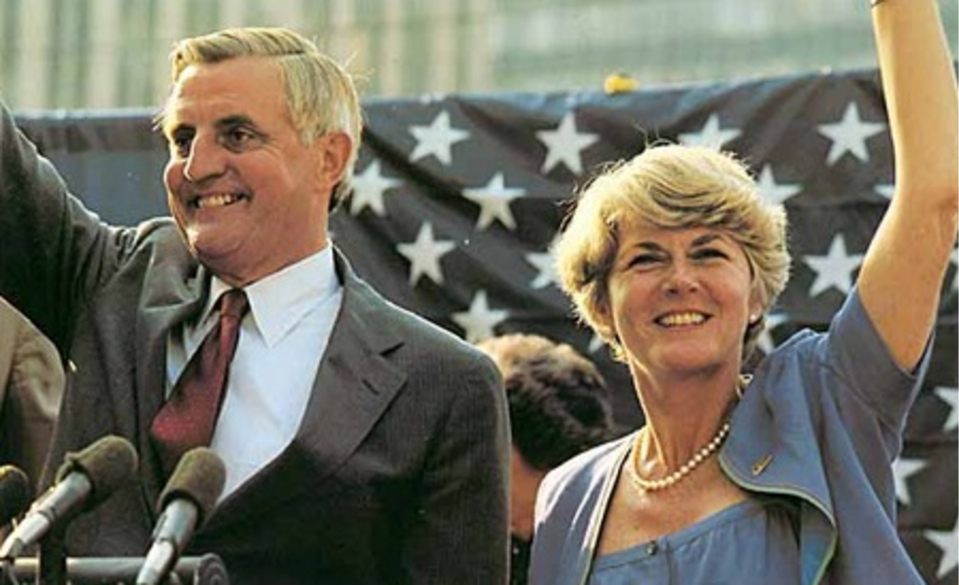
Mondale and Ferraro campaigning in 1984

Mondale picked three-term Congresswoman Geraldine Ferraro to be his running mate on July 12, 1984, making her the first woman nominated for vice president by a major U.S. political party. The pick was intended to energize Mondale's campaign, which it did at first. This effect proved short-lived, however, as it was soon overshadowed by a scandal involving Ferraro's and her husband's finances.

Shortly before the general election, Mondale defended his choice of Ferraro as his running mate against Reagan, who had recently said that her nomination was not a major breaking point. Mondale replied that he chose Ferraro "because she's the best," adding that "She is far better prepared for her position than Mr. Reagan was when he was elected president of the United States."

Mondale officially accepted the Democratic Party's nomination at the 1984 Democratic National Convention. He delivered his acceptance speech on the night of July 19, 1984, climaxing that year's convention. During the speech, Mondale controversially vowed to raise taxes but claimed that Reagan would also do so: "He won't tell you. I just did."

Many observers were surprised by Mondale's decision to call for raising taxes on millions of voters openly during a presidential election, with Reagan campaign consultant Stuart Spencer telling CBS, "I've never heard a politician say he is going to raise taxes to 30 million, 40 million, 50 million people in a campaign." Some of Mondale's fellow Democrats also distanced themselves from his tax plan.

== Campaign ==
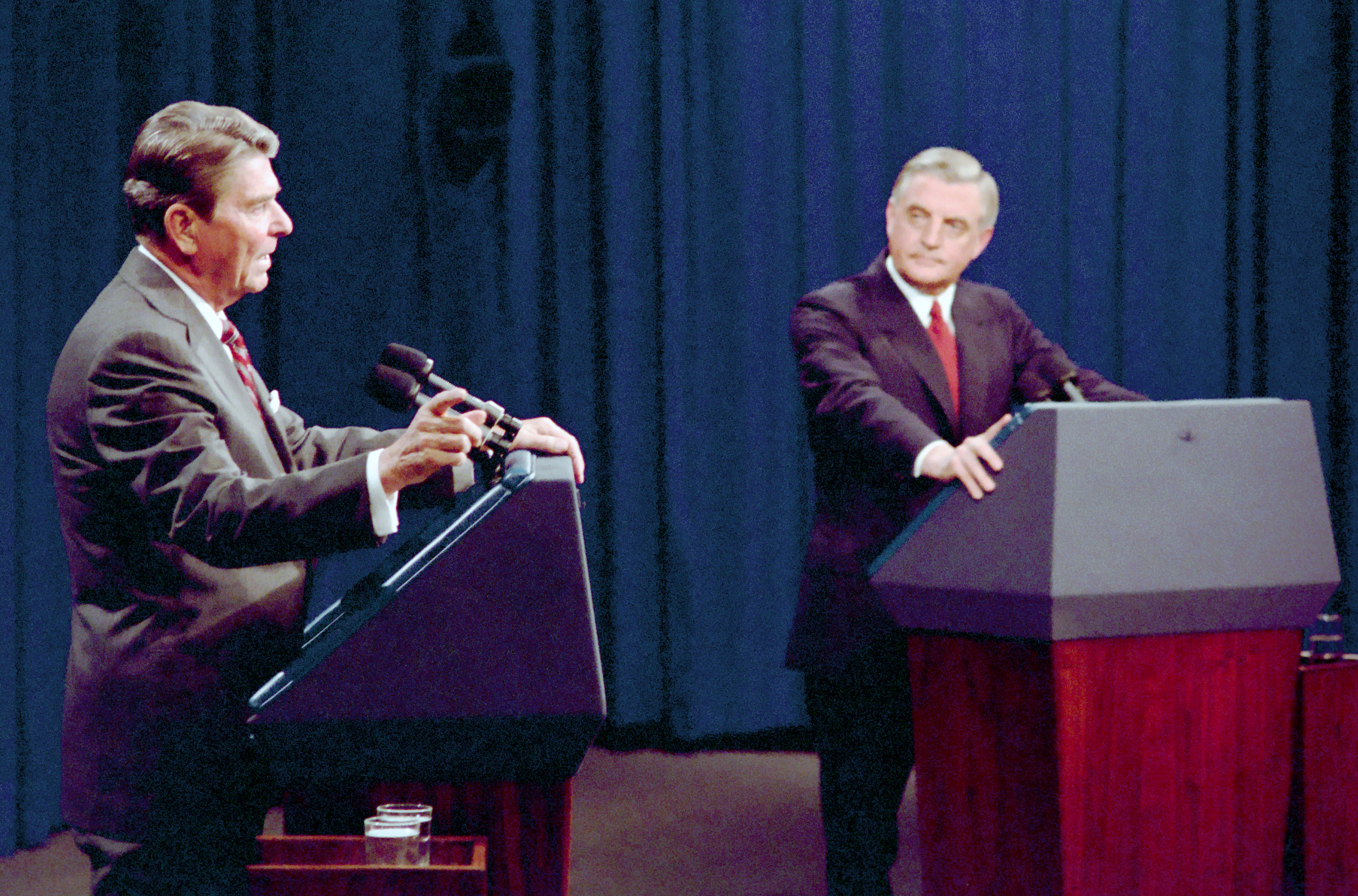
Reagan and Mondale during the second presidential debate (October 21, 1984)

During the general election, over a dozen political professionals doubted whether Mondale was appealing enough as a person to win the election and questioned his decision to spend considerable time campaigning in states that he had almost no chance of winning. Some of these professionals also told the New York Times that they were "amazed" at the sloppy preparation the campaign put into organizing events. In October 1984, shortly before the election, Mondale attempted to focus on trying to win Reagan's home state of California. That effort included spending over $3 million on television advertising there and flying Mondale in for a rally shortly thereafter. That was part of his strategy to try to win at least one big Sun Belt state.

In the general election, Mondale was endorsed by The New York Times, The Philadelphia Inquirer, the Detroit Free Press, and the Atlanta Journal-Constitution, among other newspapers.

== Endorsements ==
List of Walter Mondale 1984 presidential campaign endorsements

Presidents

- Jimmy Carter, 39th president of the United States (1977–1981) – under whom Mondale served as vice president, Governor of Georgia (1971–1975), Georgia State Senator from District 14 (1963–1967)

U.S. Senate

- Daniel Inouye, U.S. Senator from Hawaii (1963–2012)
- Patrick Leahy, U.S. Senator from Vermont (1975–2023)
- George McGovern, U.S Senator from South Dakota (1963-1981), 1972 Democratic Nominee for President

U.S. House of Representatives

- Glenn M. Anderson, member of the U.S. House of Representatives from California (1969–1993) (previously endorsed Alan Cranston)
- Jim Bates, member of the U.S. House of Representatives from California's 44th congressional district (1983–1991)
- Anthony Beilenson, member of the U.S. House of Representatives from California (1977–1997)
- Douglas H. Bosco, member of the U.S. House of Representatives from California's 1st congressional district (1983–1991)
- Sala Burton, member of the U.S. House of Representatives from California's 5th congressional district (1983–1987) (previously endorsed Alan Cranston)
- Barbara Boxer, member of the U.S. House of Representatives from California's 6th congressional district (1983–1993)
- Tony Coelho, member of the U.S. House of Representatives from California's 15th congressional district (1979–1989)
- Mervyn Dymally, member of the U.S. House of Representatives from California's 31st congressional district (1981–1993)
- Don Edwards, member of the U.S. House of Representatives from California (1963–1995) (previously endorsed Alan Cranston)
- Tom Harkin, member of the U.S. House of Representatives from Iowa's 5th congressional district (1975–1985)
- Cecil Heftel, member of the U.S. House of Representatives from Hawaii's 1st congressional district (1977–1986)
- Richard H. Lehman, member of the U.S. House of Representatives from California (1983–1995)
- Matthew G. Martínez, member of the U.S. House of Representatives from California (1982–2001) (previously endorsed Alan Cranston)
- Bob Matsui, member of the U.S. House of Representatives from California (1979–2005)
- George Miller, member of the U.S. House of Representatives from California (1975–2015)
- Leon Panetta, member of the U.S. House of Representatives from California (1977–1993)
- Pete Stark, member of the U.S. House of Representatives from California (1973–2013)
- Esteban Torres, member of the U.S. House of Representatives from California's 34th congressional district (1983–1999) (previously endorsed Alan Cranston)

Governors

- Toney Anaya, 26th Governor of New Mexico (1983–1987)
- Cecil Andrus, 26th and 28th Governor of Idaho (1971–1977; 1987–1995)
- Edgar Herschler, 28th Governor of Wyoming (1975–1987)
- Jay Rockefeller, 29th Governor of West Virginia (1977–1985)
- Bob Graham, 38th Governor of Florida (1979–1987) (previously endorsed Reubin Askew)

Statewide officials

- Madeleine Kunin, 75th Lieutenant Governor of Vermont (1979–1983)
- Tom Miller, 31st and 33rd Attorney General of Iowa (1979–1991; 1995–2023)

State legislative leaders

- Donald Avenson, Speaker of the Iowa House of Representatives (1983–1990)
- Lowell Junkins, Majority Leader of the Iowa Senate
- David Roberti, President pro tempore of the California State Senate (1981–1991) (previously endorsed Alan Cranston)

State legislators

- Julian Bond, member of the Georgia State Senate from the 39th district (1975–1987)

Party officials

- Edward Campbell, former chair of the Iowa Democratic Party
- Betty Strong, chair of the Woodbury County Democratic Party
- John B. Anderson, former Chair of the House Republican Conference (1969-1979), member of the U.S. House of Representatives from Illinois (1961–1981), 1980 Independent candidate for President

Celebrities

- Ed Asner
- Lauren Bacall
- Christie Brinkley
- James Coburn
- Neil Diamond
- Linda Evans
- Morgan Fairchild
- Sally Field
- Jane Fonda
- John Forsythe
- Bonnie Franklin
- Goldie Hawn
- Billy Joel
- Margot Kidder
- Norman Lear
- Jack Lemmon
- Hal Linden
- Eddie Murphy
- Paul Newman
- Randy Newman
- Bruce Springsteen
- Jean Stapleton
- Barbra Streisand
- Lily Tomlin
- Robin Williams
- Joanne Woodward

Organizations

- National Organization for Women

== Results ==
Soon after the election, Democrats offered multiple different theories for why Mondale lost in a landslide: Jesse Jackson argued that the Democrats had pandered too much to white men, and Mondale himself said in February 1985 that he lost because of his inability to appear compelling on television. William Raspberry disagreed with Mondale's self-assessment and argued, "What cost Mondale was the perception that Reagan, while perhaps on the wrong side of a number of specific issues, generally stood for what most Americans stood for, while Mondale, though often on the right side of the specifics, didn't really stand for anything at all." Writing in the Washington Post in March 1985, Mark Shields argued, "The single, biggest mistake made by candidate Mondale and his campaign was the failure to endorse and to embrace the Fair Tax plan of Sen. Bill Bradley (D–N.J.) and Rep. Dick Gephardt (D–Mo.)."
