= 1988 Veepstakes =

1988 Veepstakes may refer to:

- 1988 Democratic Party vice presidential candidate selection
- 1988 Republican Party vice presidential candidate selection
