= Signature Theatre =

Signature Theatre may refer to:

- Signature Theatre (Arlington, Virginia), a stage theater in Virginia
- Signature Theatre Company, a stage theater in New York
- Signature Theatres, a chain of movie theaters bought and rebranded by the Regal Entertainment Group in 2004
