= 1988 Democratic Party vice presidential candidate selection =

1988 Democratic vice presidential nomination
← 1984	July 18, 1988	1992 →
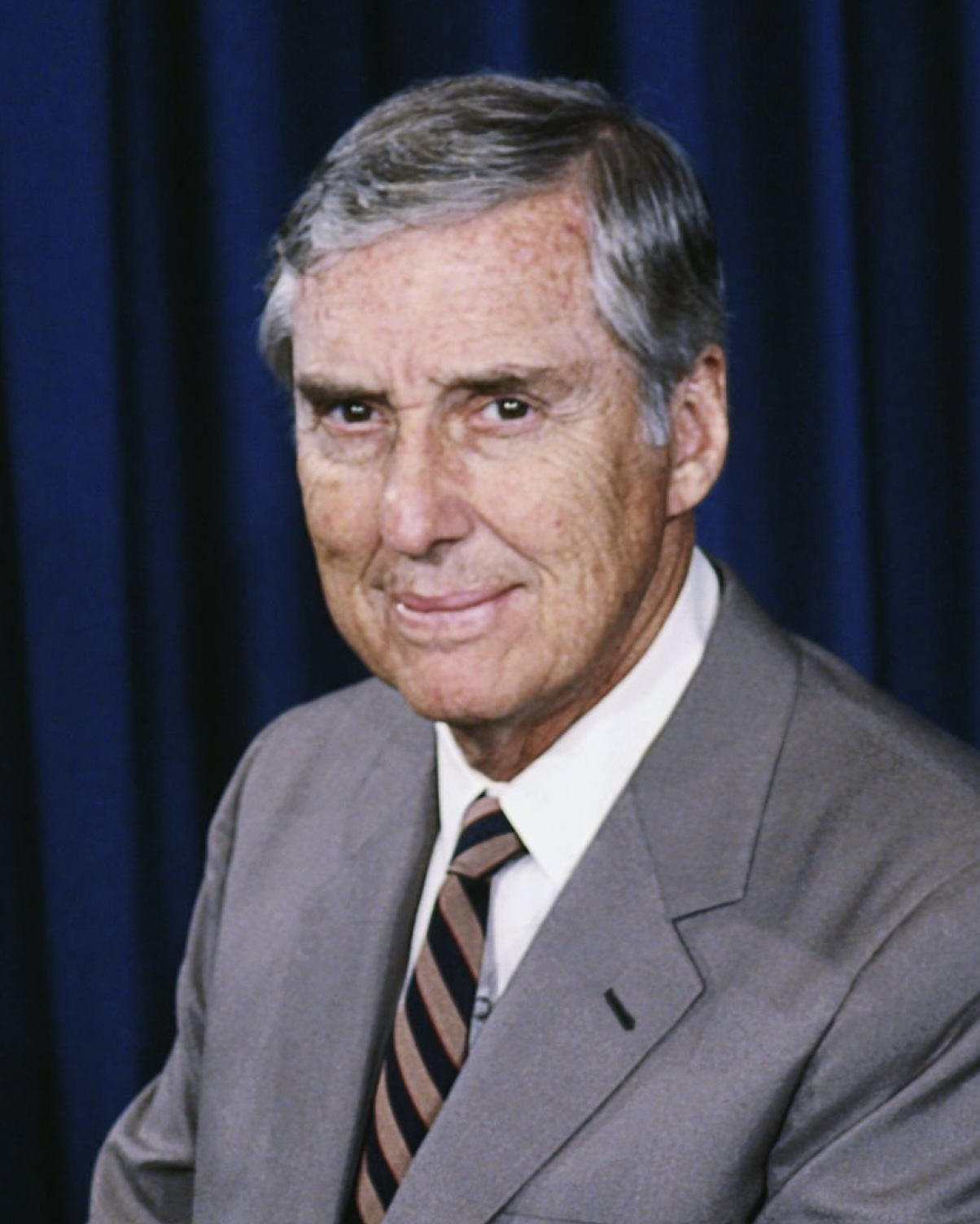
Nominee	Lloyd Bentsen
Home state	Texas
Previous Vice Presidential nominee
Geraldine Ferraro
Vice Presidential nominee
Lloyd Bentsen

This article lists those who were potential candidates for the Democratic nomination for Vice President of the United States in the 1988 election. Massachusetts Governor Michael Dukakis won the 1988 Democratic nomination for President of the United States, and chose Texas Senator Lloyd Bentsen as his running mate. Dukakis chose Bentsen in order to appeal to Southerners and in hopes of carrying Bentsen's home state of Texas. The strategy failed, as the Dukakis-Bentsen ticket went on to lose Texas and all other states in the South except West Virginia. The choice of Bentsen caused some backlash from Jesse Jackson, who had wanted to be chosen as the vice presidential nominee, and progressives such as Ralph Nader. Paul Brountas, a longtime Dukakis aide, led the search for Dukakis's running mate. The Dukakis–Bentsen ticket ultimately lost to the Bush–Quayle ticket in the general election.

Coincidental to the presidential election, Bentsen simultaneously re-elected to the fourth term as Senator, and easily won, despite the Dukakis-Bentsen ticket's double-digit loss in Texas. At the convention, Dukakis openly cast the ticket as a 1960-style pairing—“another man from Massachusetts” joined with a Texan—prompting contemporaneous press to liken it to the Kennedy-Johnson “Boston-Austin” alliance.

== Possible running mates ==
=== Final Seven ===
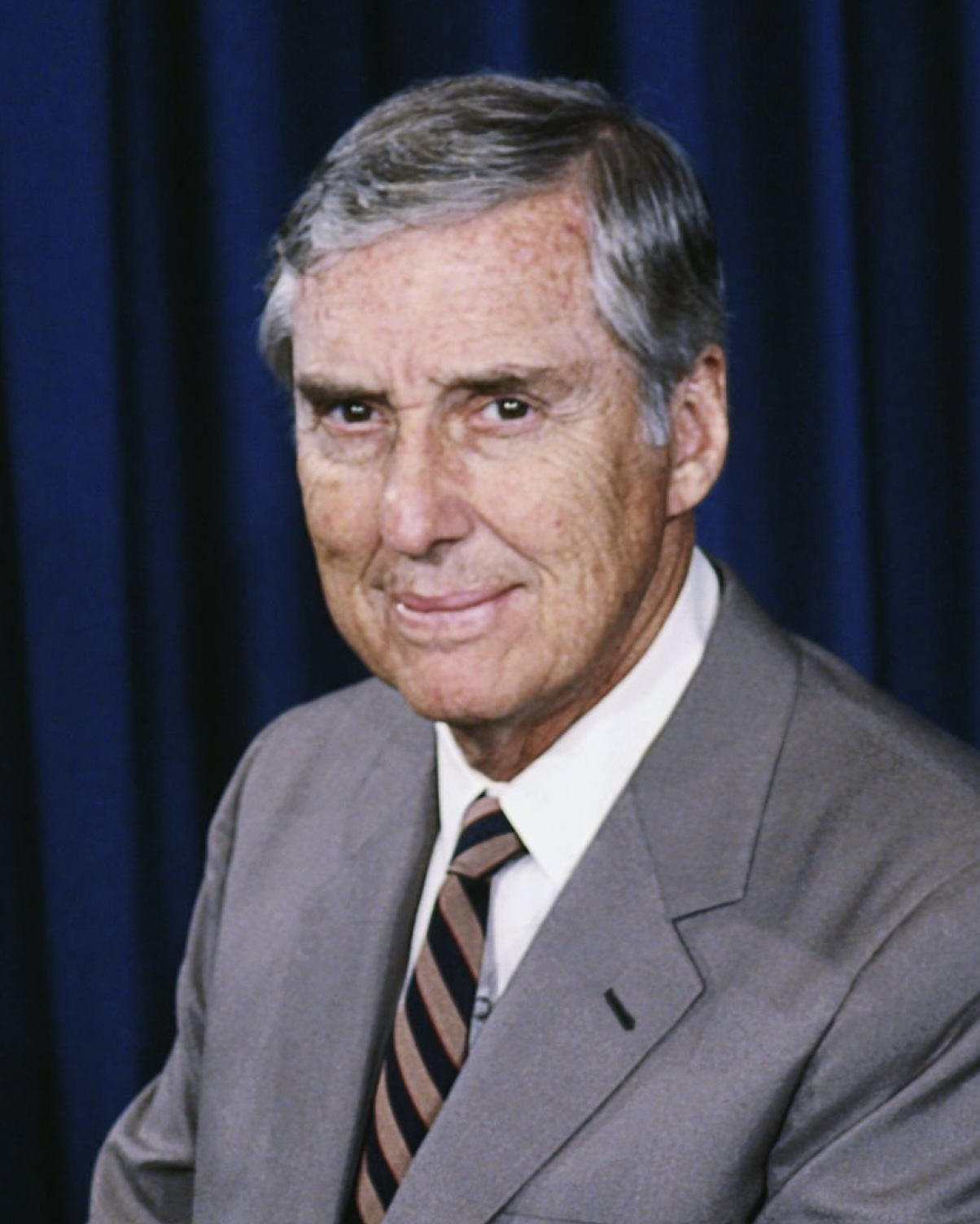
Senator and 1976 presidential candidate
Lloyd Bentsen
from Texas
(1971–1993)

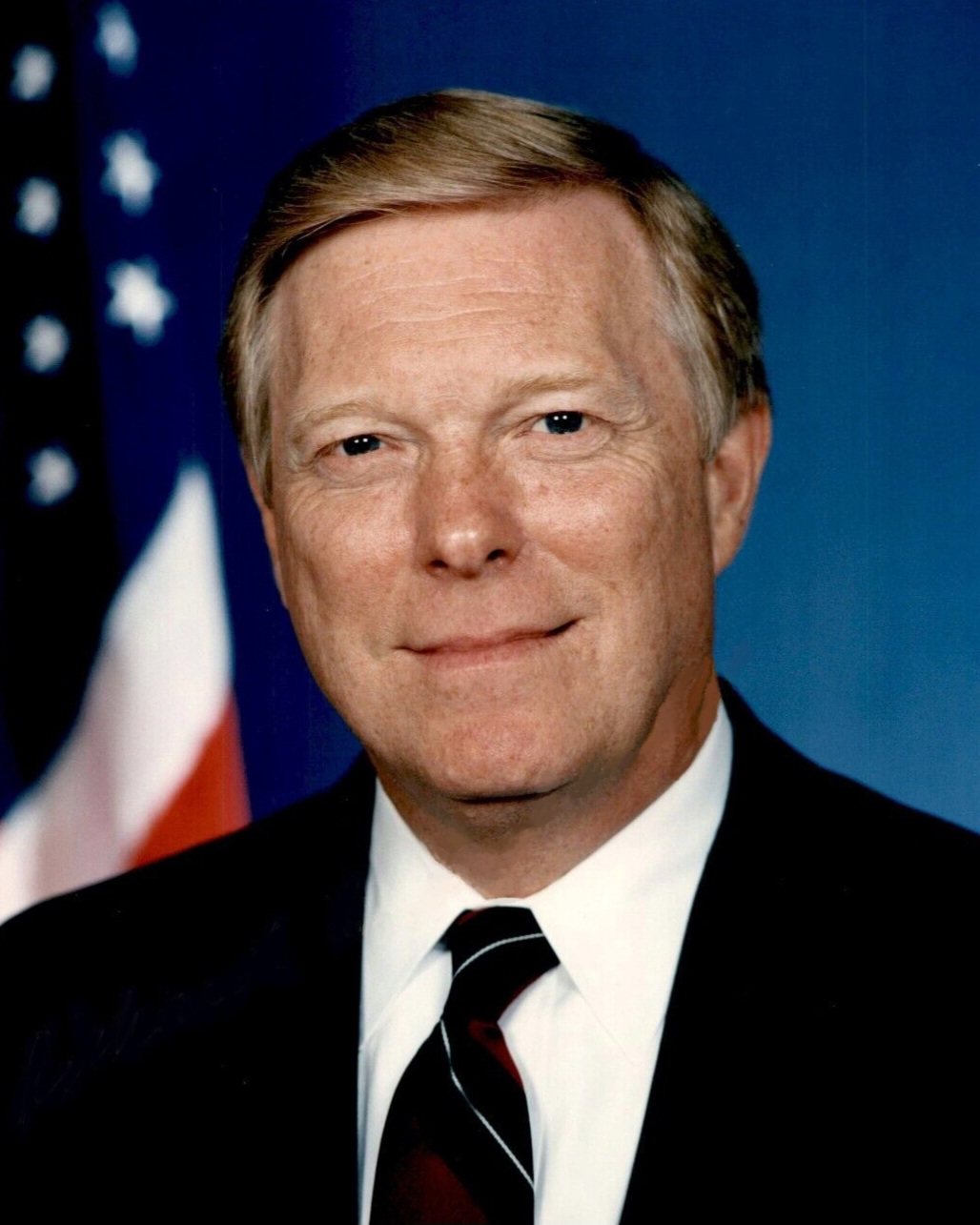
Representative and 1988 presidential candidate
Dick Gephardt
from Missouri
(1977–2005)

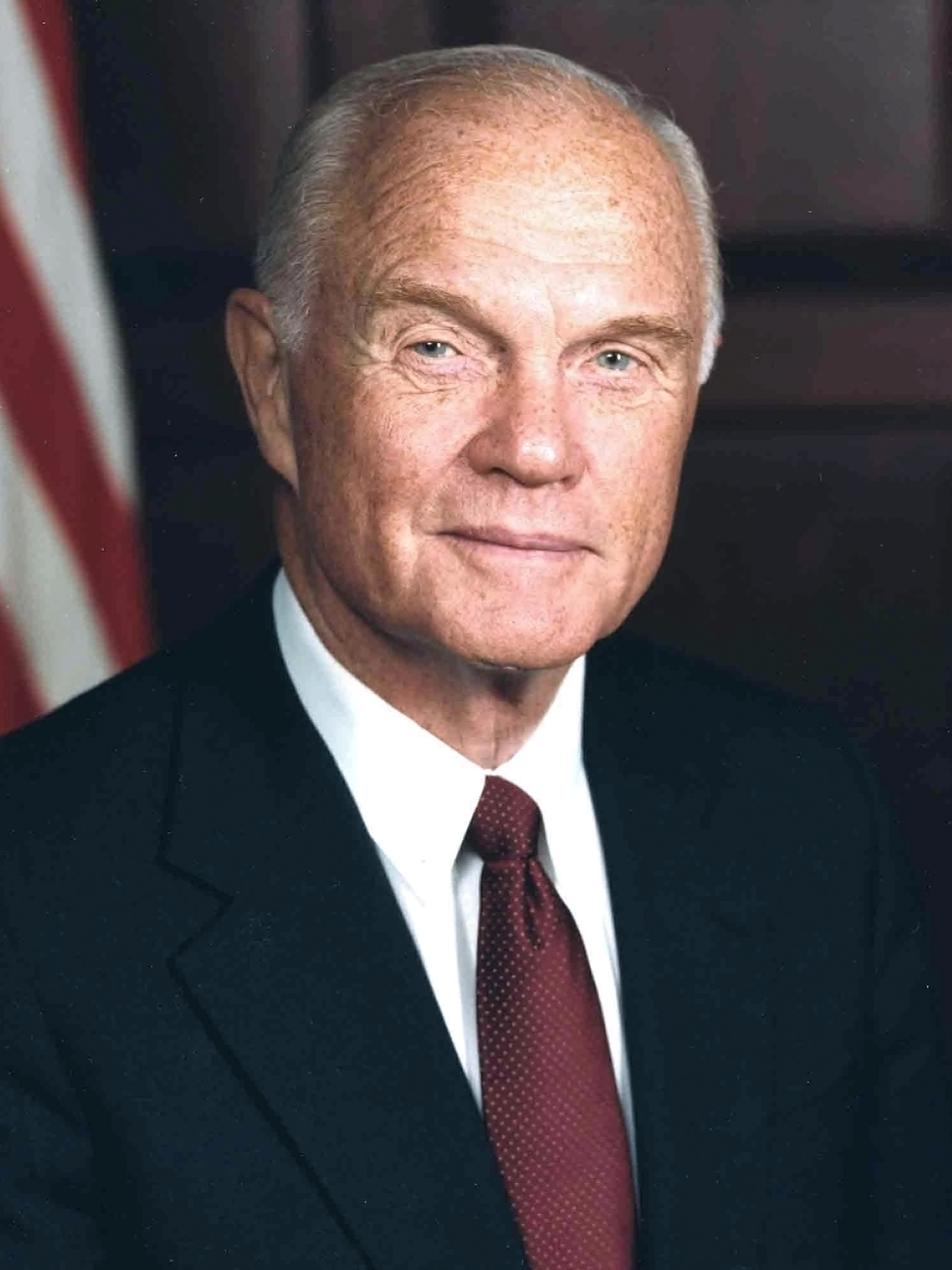
Senator and 1984 presidential candidate
John Glenn
from Ohio
(1974–1999)

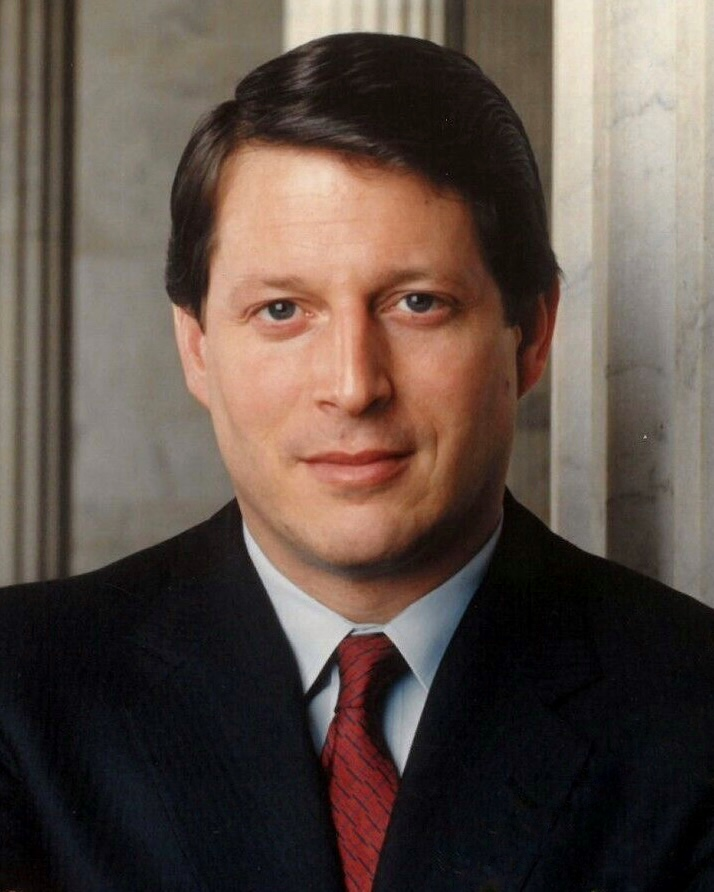
Senator and 1988 presidential candidate
Al Gore
from Tennessee
(1985–1993)

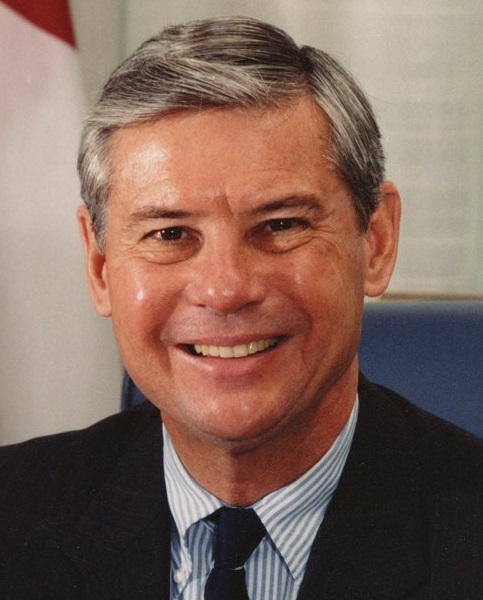
Senator
Bob Graham
from Florida
(1987–2005)

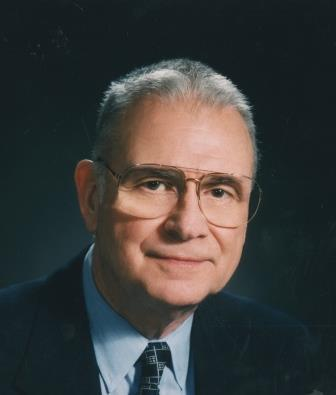
Representative
Lee H. Hamilton
from Indiana
(1965–1999)

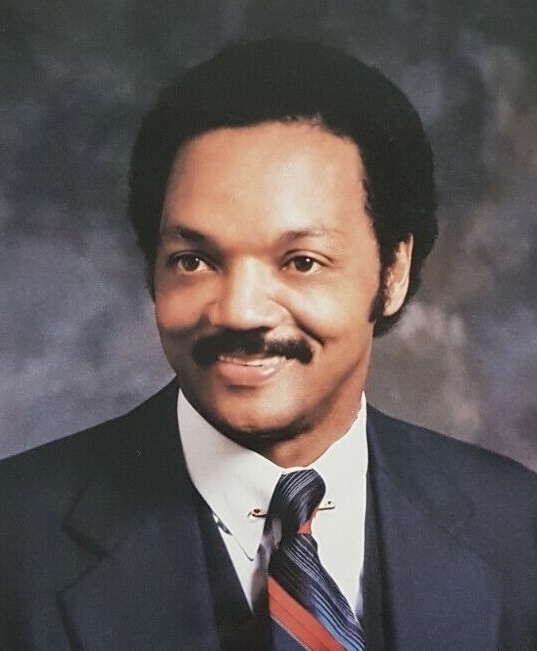
Reverend, activist and 1984/1988 presidential candidate
Jesse Jackson
from South Carolina

=== Media speculation on possible vice presidential candidates ===
Senator
Bill Bradley
from New Jersey
(1979–1997)

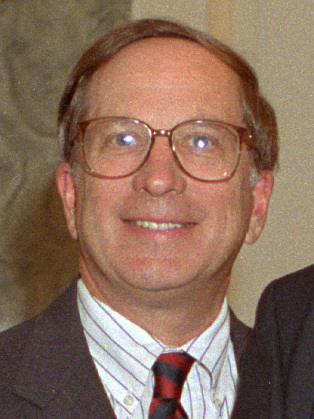
Senator
Sam Nunn
from Georgia
(1972–1997)

== See also ==
- Michael Dukakis 1988 presidential campaign
- 1988 Democratic Party presidential primaries
- 1988 Democratic National Convention
- 1988 United States presidential election
- List of United States major party presidential tickets
- Senator, you're no Jack Kennedy
