= Margaret Warner =

American journalist

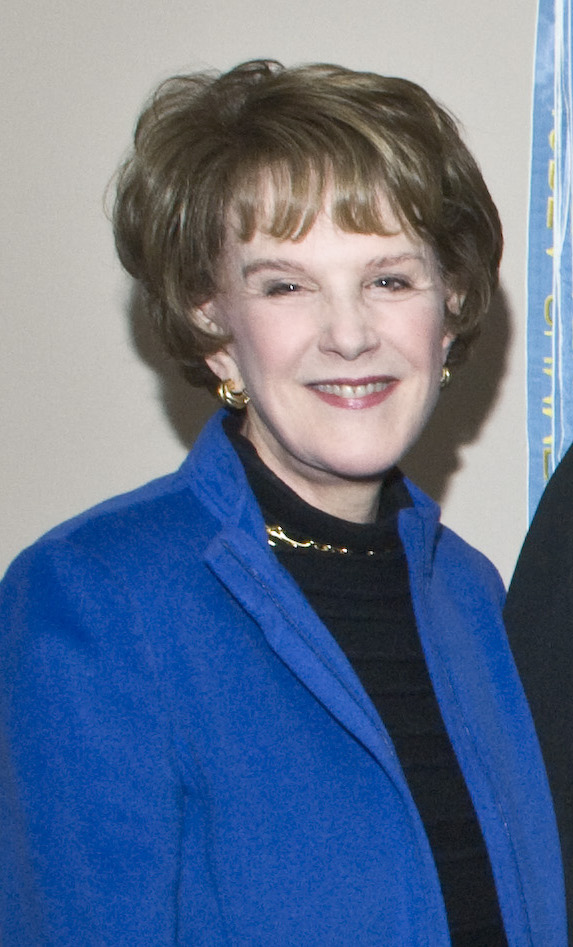
- Warner in 2011
- Born: February 12, 1950 (age 76); Chevy Chase, Maryland, U.S.
- Education: Yale University (BA)
- Occupations: Journalist and reporter senior fellow at Yale’s Jackson Institute for Foreign Affairs
- Known for: PBS Newshour
- Spouse: John R. Reilly (1986–2008; his death)

Margaret Garrard Warner (born February 12, 1950) is a former senior correspondent for The PBS NewsHour. Before joining the NewsHour in 1993, she was a reporter for The Wall Street Journal, The San Diego Union-Tribune, the Concord Monitor, and Newsweek.

In addition, Warner has appeared on PBS' Washington Week In Review and CNN's The Capital Gang and was co-host of the radio program America Abroad, which focused on international issues.

== Education and personal life ==
Margaret Warner is the daughter of Brainard Henry Warner III and Mildred Warner of Chevy Chase, Maryland. She is a graduate of the Holton-Arms School of Bethesda, Maryland, and graduated from Yale University with a BA, cum laude, in English in 1971. Her father was a partner in the Washington law firm of Ogilby, Huhn & Barr. Her mother, Mildred Warner, was a trustee of the Corcoran Gallery of Art in Washington.

Warner is a great-granddaughter of the founder of the Washington Loan and Trust Company, which was consolidated into the Riggs National Bank.

She was married to former Chairman of the Federal Trade Commission, John R. Reilly, until his death in October 2008.

== Career ==
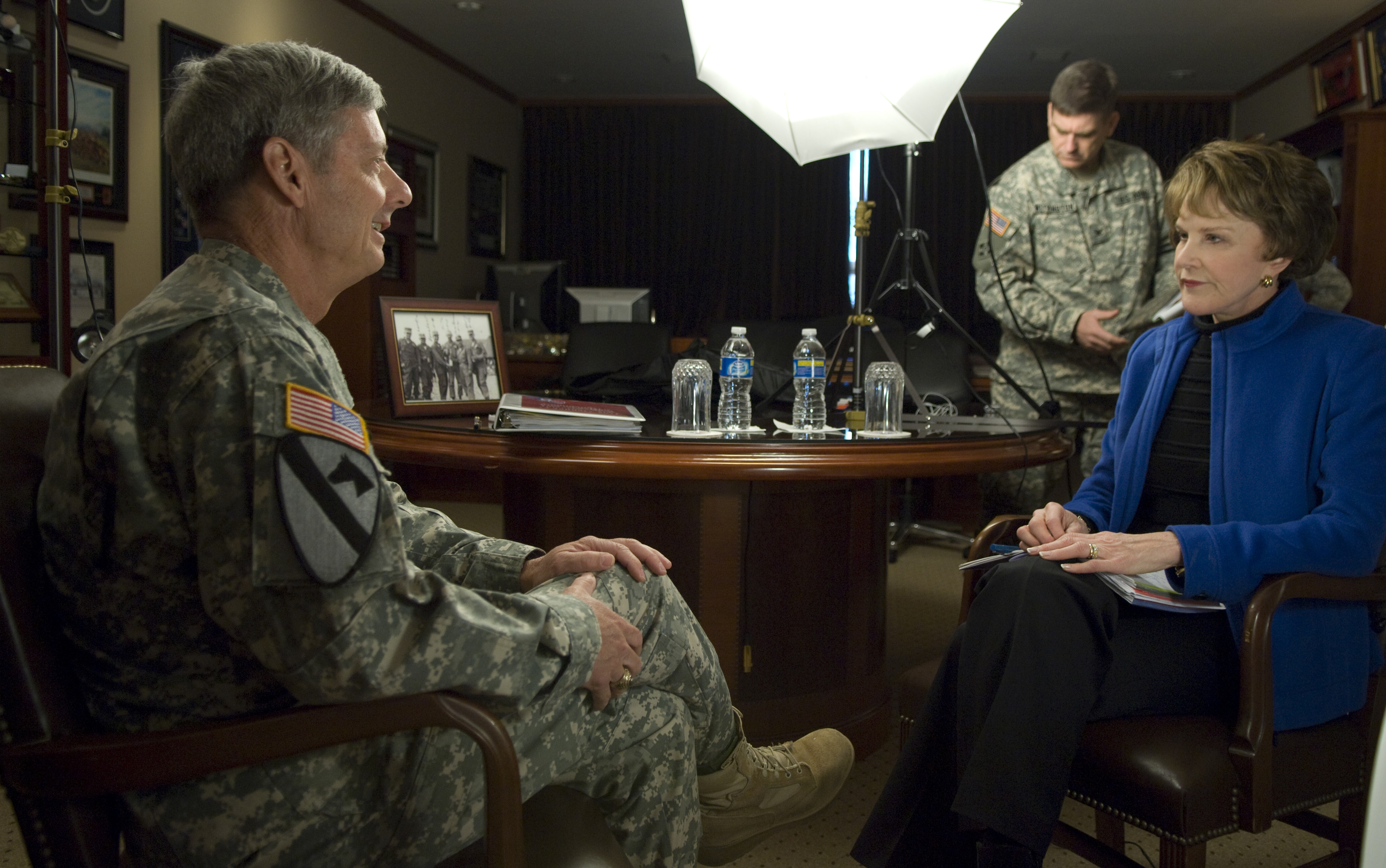
Margaret Warner (right) interviewing General Walter L. Sharp during a documentary on the Republic of Korea (2011)

During the 1980s and 1990s, Warner worker as a reporter for Newsweek magazine.

In 1993, Warner joined PBS Newshour as a Washington based Senior Correspondent. Since 2006, Warner has compiled on-the-ground reports for the PBS NewsHour. Much of her reporting is low-budget and covers civil liberties and politics in South Asia, China and Russia. Between 2009 and 2013, she was one of the program's rotating group of co-anchors.

She is a member of the Council on Foreign Relations, a trustee of the Virginia Foundation for Independent Colleges, and she serves on the President's Council on International Activities at Yale University.

== Awards and honors ==
- 2008. Warner won an Emmy Award for her coverage of the turmoil in Pakistan and the Edward Weintal Prize for International Reporting from Georgetown University's Institute for the Study of Diplomacy for her overseas reporting
- 1990. Her diplomatic coverage for Newsweek during the Gulf War made her runner-up for the National Press Club's 1990 Edwin M. Hood Award for Diplomatic Reporting.
- She also shared, with a Newsweek team, the prestigious George Polk Award for coverage of terrorism, and the Best Reporting Award from the Overseas Press Club.
