= Maxine Isaacs =

American political analyst and university lecturer

- Born: 1947 (age 78–79); Cleveland, Ohio, U.S.
- Education: Skidmore College; Johns Hopkins University; University of Maryland
- Employer: Harvard University
- Board member of: Signature Theatre; Skidmore College

Maxine Isaacs is an American university lecturer and political analyst who served as a member of the press office of Walter Mondale during his tenure in the United States Senate and as deputy press secretary when he was vice president during the Jimmy Carter administration. She was later press secretary for Mondale's 1984 presidential campaign. Following her career in politics, she became a lecturer at Harvard University and, occasionally, at George Washington University and New York University, teaching courses on U.S. politics and presidential campaigns.

== Early life and career ==
Maxine Isaacs is one of three children of Amy Isaacs (née Jacobson) and Bernard Isaacs of Shaker Heights, Ohio. Her father was a naval officer who was selected to help train the Golden Thirteen, the first African-American candidates to become U.S. Navy officers. After the war, he became a representative for a plumbing and heating supplies manufacturer. He was also involved in politics and the civil rights movement. Maxine said her political views came from her father who was a Hubert Humphrey supporter. Her father was Jewish and experienced antisemitism while growing up in a mostly Polish-American town in Wisconsin where many people harbored pro-Nazi sentiments. She graduated from Shaker Heights High School in 1965. She then graduated in 1969 with an AB in American studies from Skidmore College in Saratoga Springs, New York. After graduating from Skidmore, she lived in Japan for about a year.

== Political career ==
In 1971, Isaacs was hired to be legislative assistant, press secretary, and speechwriter for Representative Louis Stokes, a Democrat from Ohio. In 1973, she transferred to Walter Mondale's U.S. Senate office to become the Minnesota senator's deputy press secretary. When Mondale's 1974 exploratory presidential campaign came to an end, she became a freelance writer for NPR and The Africa Report. She rejoined Mondale's vice presidential campaign staff in 1976 when Jimmy Carter asked Mondale to serve as his running mate.

Mondale was elected as vice president in the 1976 presidential election, and Isaacs became his deputy press secretary in the White House. Isaacs often traveled with the Vice President as he went on diplomatic missions around the world. In the 1980 reelection campaign for Mondale and Carter, she served as traveling press secretary in a campaign which accumulated more than 200,000 miles (320,000 kilometers) of travel between September 1979 and November 1980. The Carter ticket lost the 1980 presidential election.

In the early 1980s, she ran her own public relations consulting firm, Maximum Inc., in Washington, D.C. In February 1981, she announced the formation of an exploratory committee for Mondale's possible candidacy in the 1984 presidential election. Isaacs became deputy campaign manager and press secretary for Mondale's 1984 presidential campaign. After his loss to Ronald Reagan, Mondale ended his political career and returned to practicing law.

== Academic career and later life ==
In 1988, she graduated with a master's degree in international public policy from Johns Hopkins University. In 1994, she earned a Ph.D. from the School of Public Policy of the University of Maryland (UMD) in College Park. Her dissertation was a comparative study of elite and public opinion on foreign policy. The same year, she became a lecturer on public policy at the Kennedy School of Government at Harvard University. She has taught courses at Harvard, and occasionally at George Washington University and New York University, on the relationship between the media and politics, with a special focus on U.S. presidential campaigns and elections.

In 2014, Isaacs was inducted into the Hall of Fame of Shaker Heights High School. In 2019, she received the Distinguished Achievement Award from her alma mater, Skidmore College, where she serves as a trustee. Isaacs also served as a board member of the Shorenstein Center on Media, Politics and Public Policy.

== Personal life ==
Isaacs was married for eight years before her divorce in 1977. In 1985, she married James A. Johnson, the former chairman of Mondale's presidential campaign. They had a son, Alfred Johnson. The couple separated in 2010 and subsequently divorced.

Isaacs has been interested in theater from a young age. In 2004, she became a board member of Signature Theatre in Arlington, Virginia. She co-chaired the theatre's capital campaign to fund its move to a new facility in Shirlington. The Signature Theatre's main stage, the Max, is named for Isaacs. She also serves as a trustee of the American Associates of the Royal National Theatre. She formerly served as a member of the Board of Governors of the Folger Shakespeare Library.
