= Electoral history of Tip O'Neill =

List of elections featuring Thomas P. "Tip" O'Neill as a candidate

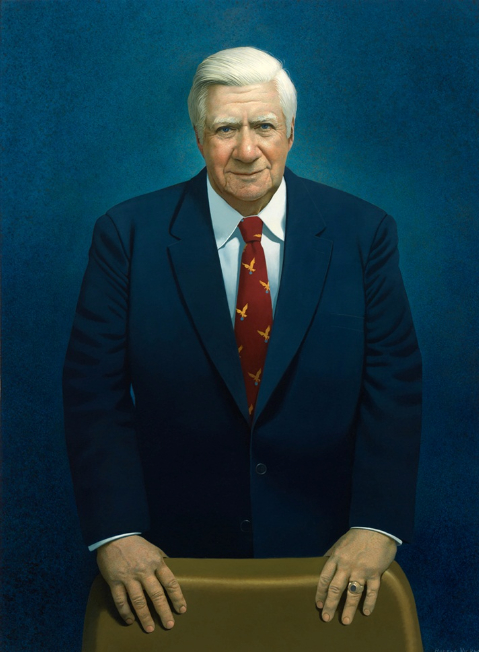
Official Speaker portrait of Tip O'Neill, 1986

Electoral history of Thomas P. "Tip" O'Neill Jr., United States Representative for Massachusetts, from the 11th (1953–1963) and 8th districts (1963–1987), Speaker of the House (1977–1987).

O'Neill's 6 decade political career begun with his election to the Massachusetts House of Representatives in 1937 and ended with his retirement in 1987.

== U.S. House of Representatives ==
=== 1952 ===
Massachusetts's 11th congressional district election, 1952
Primary election
Party	Candidate	Votes	%
Democratic	Tip O'Neill	27,954	45.71
Democratic	Michael LoPresti	24,692	40.38
Democratic	Edmund J. Casey	4,303	7.04
Democratic	Christopher Carolina	1,763	2.88
Democratic	John J. DeBernardo	846	1.38
Democratic	Thomas A. Niland	828	1.35
Democratic	Louis Reppucci	767	1.25
Total votes		61,153	100.00
General election
Democratic	Tip O'Neill	86,532	69.29
Republican	Jesse A. Rogers	37,816	30.28
Prohibition	William D. Ross	542	0.43
Total votes		124,890	100.00

=== 1954 ===
Massachusetts's 11th congressional district election, 1954
Party	Candidate	Votes	%
Democratic	Tip O'Neill (incumbent)	75,613	78.23
Republican	Charles S. Bolster	21,039	21.77
Total votes		96,652	100.00

=== 1956 ===
Massachusetts's 11th congressional district election, 1956
Party	Candidate	Votes	%
Democratic	Tip O'Neill (incumbent)	83,532	75.31
Republican	Rudolph E. Mottola	27,384	24.69
Total votes		110,916	100.00

=== 1958 ===
Massachusetts's 11th congressional district election, 1958
Party	Candidate	Votes	%
Democratic	Tip O'Neill (incumbent)	68,353	80.39
Republican	Elliott H. Stone	16,669	19.61
Total votes		85,022	100.00

=== 1960 ===
Massachusetts's 11th congressional district election, 1960
Party	Candidate	Votes	%
Democratic	Tip O'Neill (incumbent)	87,866	100.00
Total votes		87,866	100.00

=== 1962 ===
Massachusetts's 8th congressional district election, 1962
Party	Candidate	Votes	%
Democratic	Tip O'Neill (incumbent)	100,814	72.95
Republican	Howard D. Greyber	37,374	27.05
Total votes		138,188	100.00

=== 1964 ===
Massachusetts's 8th congressional district election, 1964
Party	Candidate	Votes	%
Democratic	Tip O'Neill (incumbent)	122,050	100.00
Total votes		122,050	100.00

=== 1966 ===
Massachusetts's 8th congressional district election, 1966
Party	Candidate	Votes	%
Democratic	Tip O'Neill (incumbent)	102,104	100.00
Total votes		102,104	100.00

=== 1968 ===
Massachusetts's 8th congressional district election, 1968
Party	Candidate	Votes	%
Democratic	Tip O'Neill (incumbent)	107,645	100.00
Total votes		107,645	100.00

=== 1970 ===
Massachusetts's 8th congressional district election, 1970
Party	Candidate	Votes	%
Democratic	Tip O'Neill (incumbent)	89,875	100.00
Total votes		89,875	100.00

=== 1972 ===
Massachusetts's 8th congressional district election, 1972
Party	Candidate	Votes	%
Democratic	Tip O'Neill (incumbent)	142,470	88.66
Socialist Workers	John E. Powers	18,169	11.31
Write-in		48	0.03
Total votes		160,687	100.00

=== 1974 ===
Massachusetts's 8th congressional district election, 1974
Party	Candidate	Votes	%
Democratic	Tip O'Neill (incumbent)	107,042	87.85
U.S. Labor	James H. Kiggen	8,363	6.86
Communist	Laura Ross	6,421	5.27
Write-in		19	0.02
Total votes		121,845	100.00

=== 1976 ===
Massachusetts's 8th congressional district election, 1976
Party	Candidate	Votes	%
Democratic	Tip O'Neill (incumbent)	133,131	74.44
Republican	William A. Barnstead	33,437	18.7
Independent	Florenzo Di Donato	8,233	4.6
American	Leo F. Kahian	4,022	2.25
Write-in		27	0.02
Total votes		178,850	100.00

=== 1978 ===
Massachusetts's 8th congressional district election, 1978
Party	Candidate	Votes	%
Democratic	Tip O'Neill (incumbent)	102,160	74.61
Republican	William A. Barnstead	28,566	20.86
Communist	Laura Ross	6,193	4.52
Total votes		136,919	100.00

=== 1980 ===
Massachusetts's 8th congressional district election, 1980
Party	Candidate	Votes	%
Democratic	Tip O'Neill (incumbent)	128,689	78.38
Republican	William A. Barnstead	35,477	21.62
Total votes		164,166	100.00

=== 1982 ===
Massachusetts's 8th congressional district election, 1982
Party	Candidate	Votes	%
Democratic	Tip O'Neill (incumbent)	123,296	74.87
Republican	Frank Luke McNamara Jr.	41,370	25.12
Total votes		164,666	100.00

=== 1984 ===
Massachusetts's 8th congressional district election, 1984
Party	Candidate	Votes	%
Democratic	Tip O'Neill (incumbent)	179,617	91.83
Communist	Laura Ross	15,810	8.08
Write-in		176	0.09
Total votes		195,603	100.00

== Speaker of the House ==
=== 1977 election ===
1977 election for speaker
Party	Candidate	Votes	%
Democratic	Tip O'Neill (MA 8)	290	66.82
Republican	John J. Rhodes (AZ 1)	142	32.72
—	Present	2	0.46
Total votes		434	100
Votes necessary		218	>50

=== 1979 election ===
1979 election for speaker
Party	Candidate	Votes	%
Democratic	Tip O'Neill (MA 8) (incumbent)	268	63.51
Republican	John J. Rhodes (AZ 1)	152	36.02
—	Present	2	0.47
Total votes		422	112
Votes necessary		212	>50

=== 1981 election ===
1981 election for speaker
Party	Candidate	Votes	%
Democratic	Tip O'Neill (MA 8) (incumbent)	234	55.98
Republican	Robert H. Michel (IL 18)	182	43.54
—	Present	2	0.48
Total votes		419	100
Votes necessary		210	>50

=== 1983 election ===
1983 election for speaker
Party	Candidate	Votes	%
Democratic	Tip O'Neill (MA 8) (incumbent)	260	62.35
Republican	Robert H. Michel (IL 18)	155	37.17
—	Present	2	0.48
Total votes		417	100
Votes necessary		209	>50

=== 1985 election ===
1985 election for speaker
Party	Candidate	Votes	%
Democratic	Tip O'Neill (MA 8) (incumbent)	247	58.11
Republican	Robert H. Michel (IL 18)	175	41.18
—	Present	3	0.71
Total votes		425	100
Votes necessary		213	>50

== Sources ==
- "Congressional Record (Bound Edition)". govinfo.gov. Washington, D.C.: United States Government Publishing Office.
- Heitshusen, Valerie (September 14, 2023). Speakers of the House: Elections, 1913–2023 (Report). Congressional Research Service.
