= 1984 Democratic Party vice presidential candidate selection =

1984 Democratic vice presidential nomination
- July 16, 1984
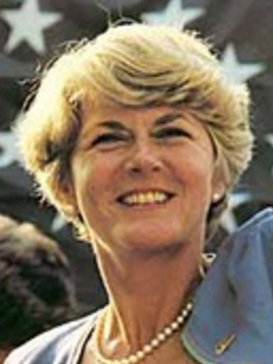
Nominee	Geraldine Ferraro
Home state	New York
Previous Vice Presidential nominee
Walter Mondale
Vice Presidential nominee
Geraldine Ferraro

This article lists those who were potential candidates for the Democratic nomination for vice president of the United States in the 1984 election. Former Vice President Walter Mondale won the 1984 Democratic nomination for president of the United States, and chose New York Representative Geraldine Ferraro as his running mate. Ferraro was the first woman to be a part of a national ticket for a major party. Mondale chose Ferraro in hopes of energizing the base and winning the votes of women, but also because he viewed her as a solid legislator who had won the approval of Speaker Tip O'Neill. If elected, she would have been the first female vice president but the feat would later be accomplished by Kamala Harris in 2020. The Mondale–Ferraro ticket ultimately lost to the Reagan–Bush ticket. Until 2024, this was the last time the Democratic vice presidential nominee was neither the incumbent vice president nor a senator.

== Speculation ==
On December 10, 1983, the Alabama Legislative Black Caucus endorsed Mondale for president and Jesse Jackson for vice president.

George McGovern supported selecting Gary Hart as the vice presidential nominee.

Cecil Andrus, the co-chair of Mondale's presidential campaign, stated that he should pick a woman to serve as his running mate. He suggested Pat Schroeder, Geraldine Ferraro and Dianne Feinstein.

== Selection ==
John R. Reilly, an attorney and a senior adviser to Mondale, managed the search for a running mate. Mondale seriously considered Hart, but Mondale refused to consider a second rival, Jesse Jackson, on the grounds that the differences between their policies were too great.

Mondale conducted interviews with Feinstein and Lloyd Bentsen. The National Organization for Women demanded that a woman be selected.

=== Finalists ===
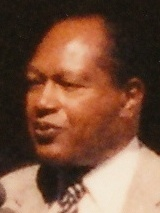
Mayor of Los Angeles
Tom Bradley
from California
(1973–1993)

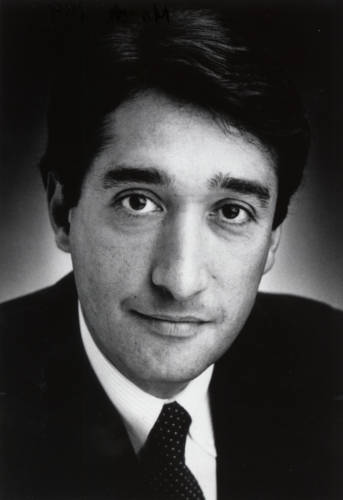
Mayor of San Antonio
Henry Cisneros
from Texas
(1981–1989)

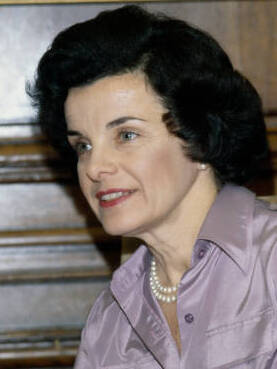
Mayor of San Francisco
Dianne Feinstein
from California
(1978–1988)

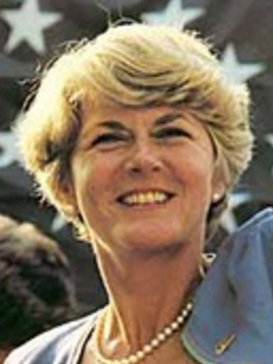
Representative
Geraldine Ferraro
from New York
(1979–1985)

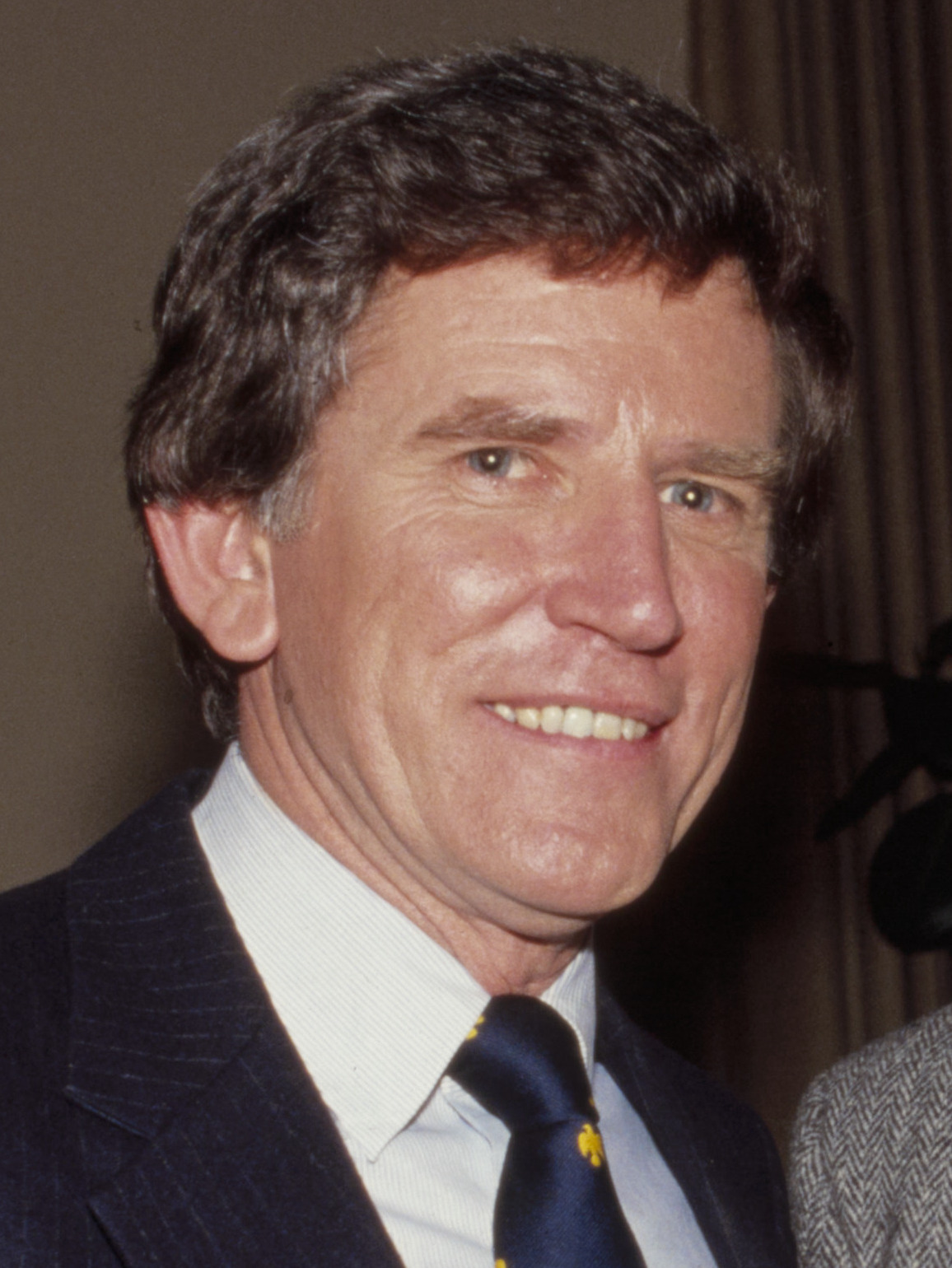
Senator and 1984 presidential candidate
Gary Hart
from Colorado
(1975–1987)

== Media speculation on possible vice presidential candidates ==
Members of Congress

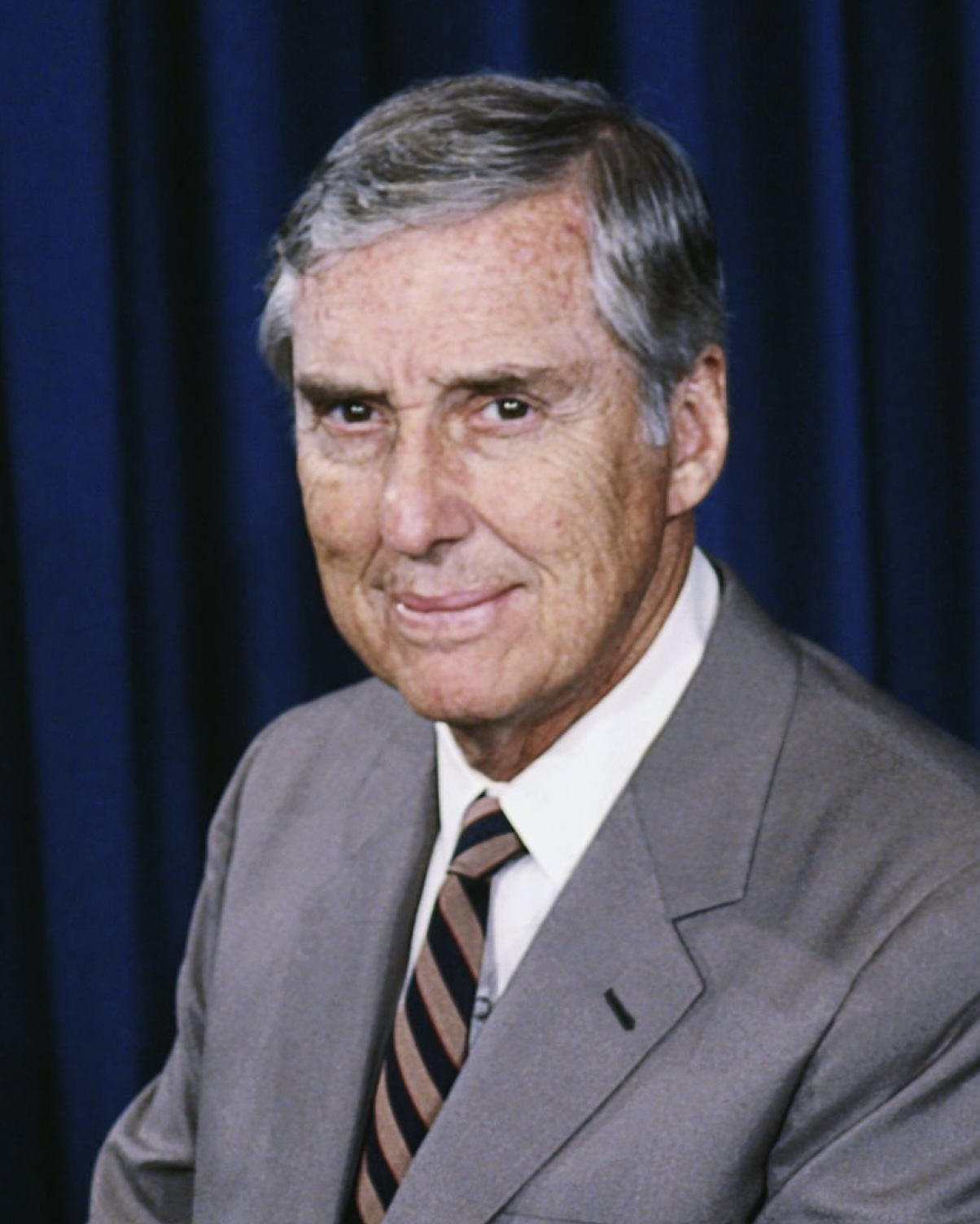
Senator and 1976 presidential candidate
Lloyd Bentsen
from Texas
(1971–1993)

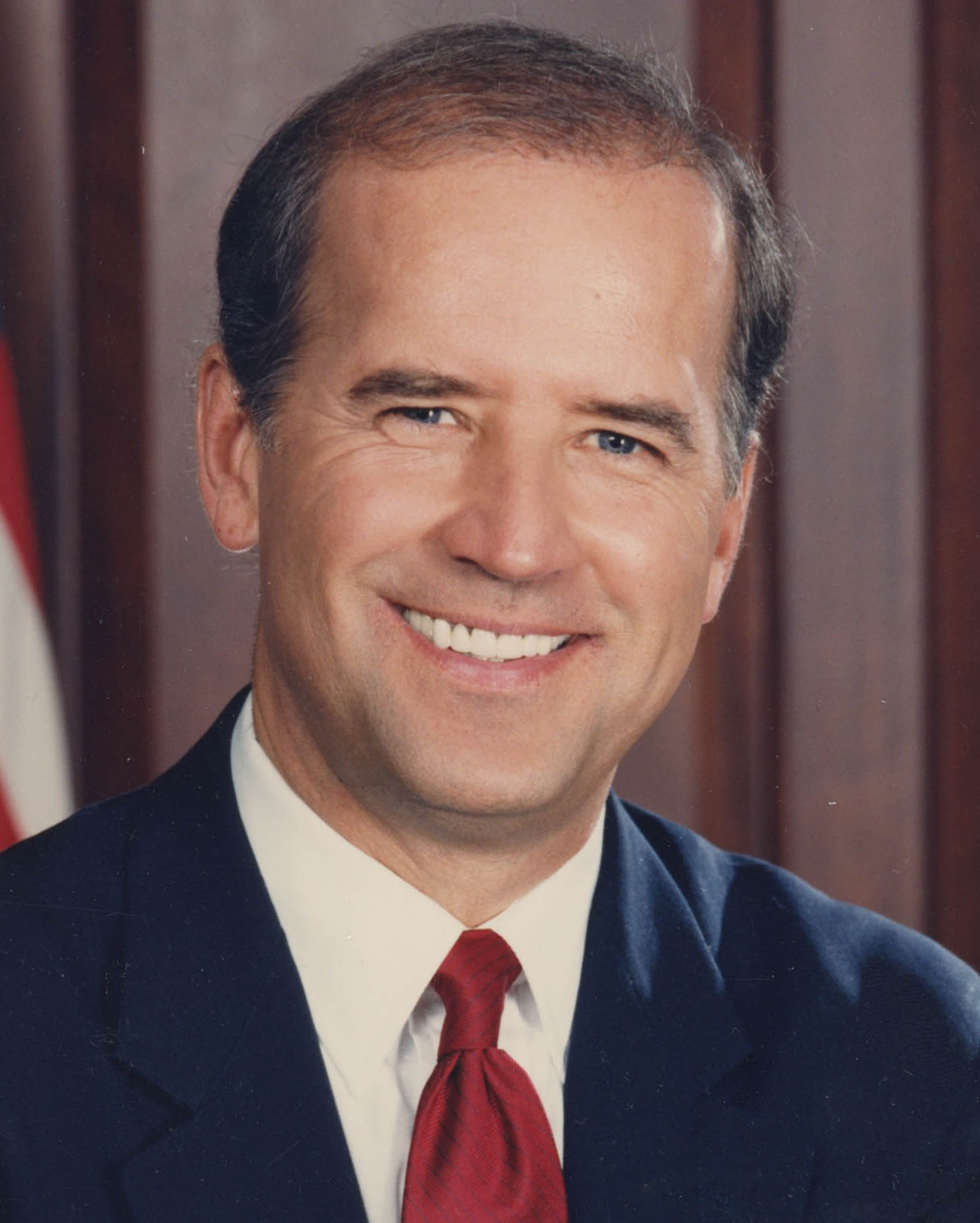
Senator
Joe Biden
from Delaware
(1973–2009)

Senator
Bill Bradley
from New Jersey
(1979–1997)

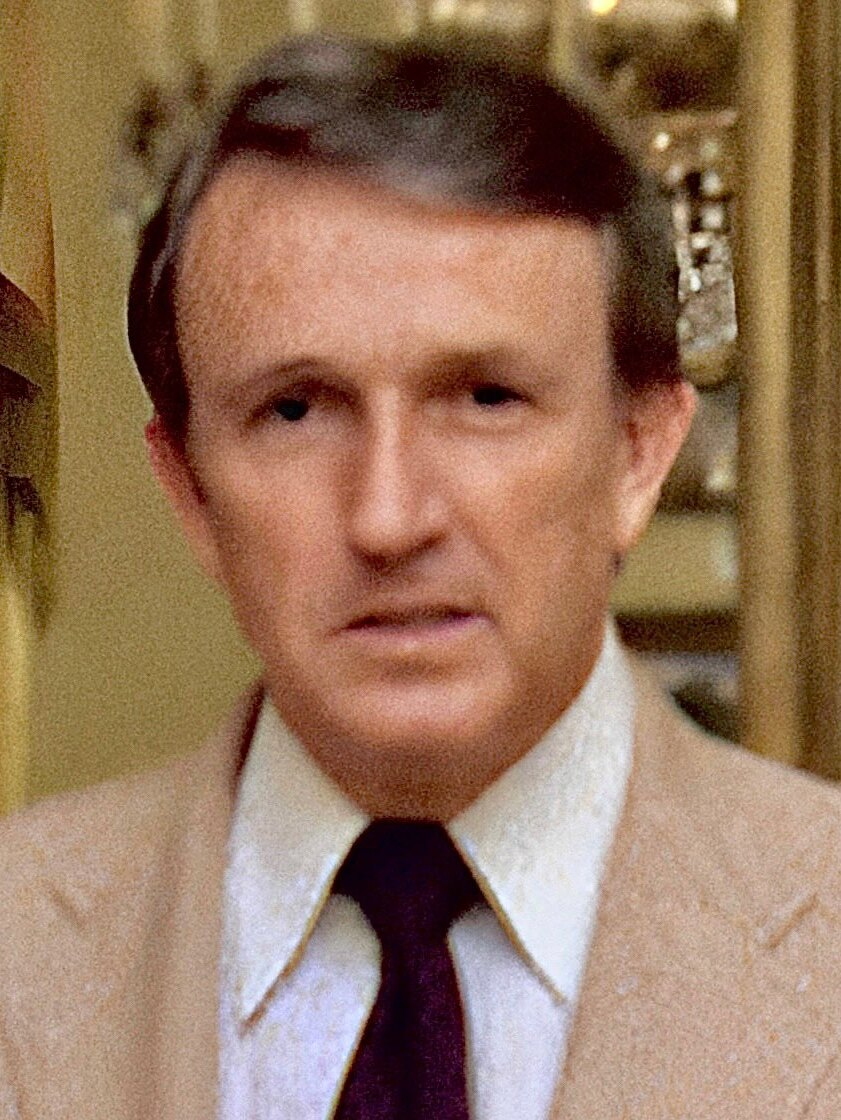
Senator
Dale Bumpers
from Arkansas
(1975–1999)

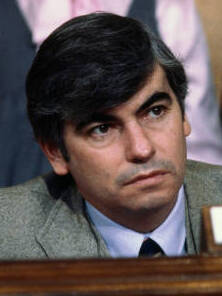
Senator
Chris Dodd
from Connecticut
(1981–2011)

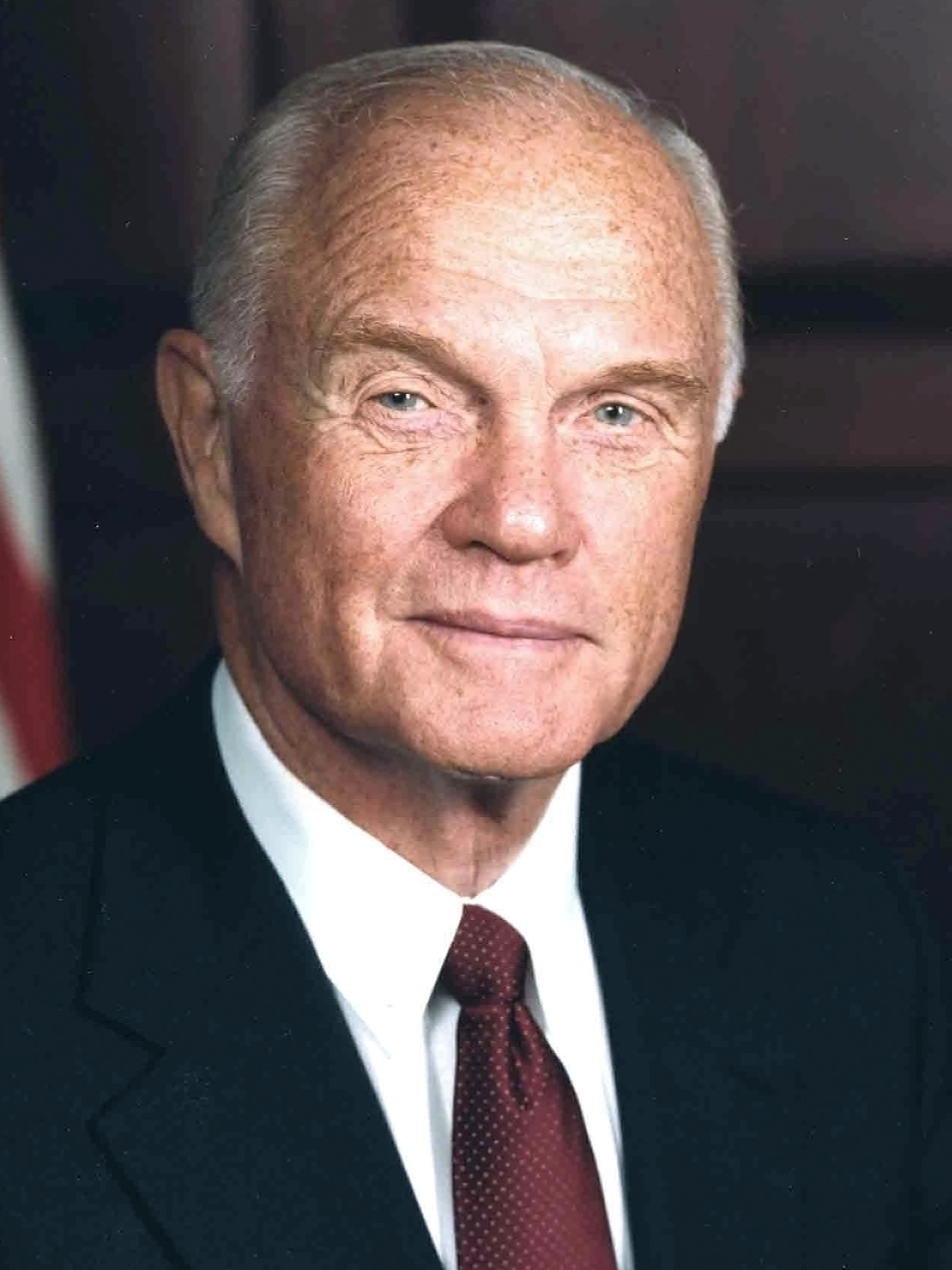
Senator and 1984 presidential candidate
John Glenn
from Ohio
(1974–1999)

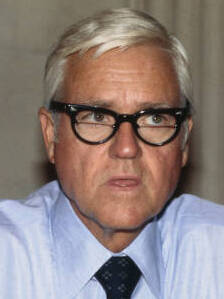
Senator and 1984 presidential candidate
Fritz Hollings
from South Carolina
(1966–2005)

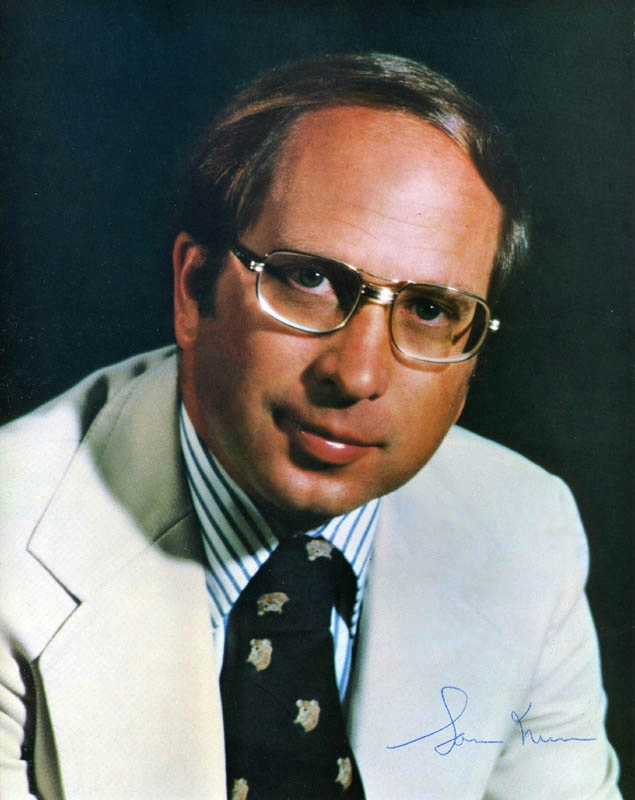
Senator
Sam Nunn
from Georgia
(1972–1997)

Governors

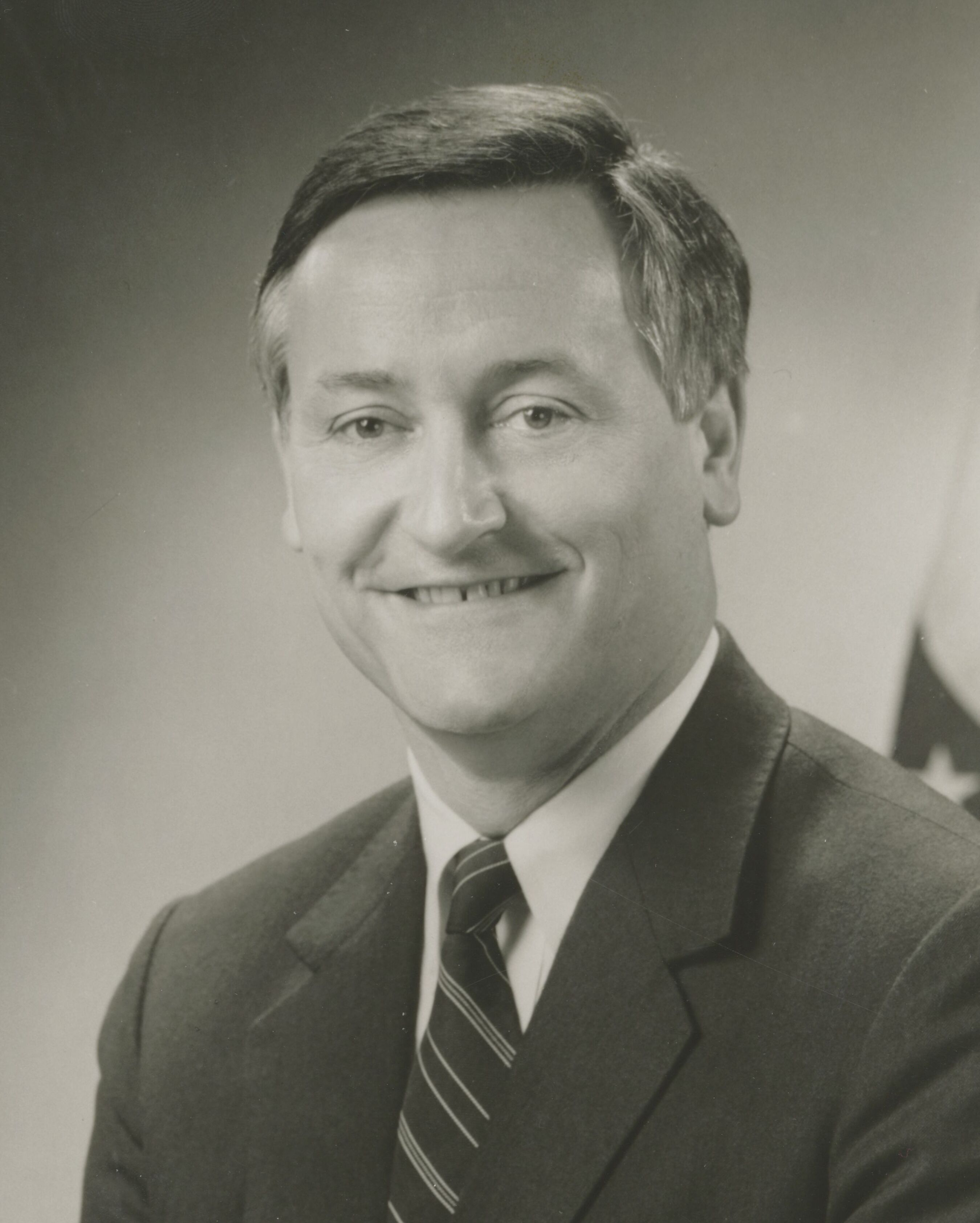
Governor
Richard Celeste
of Ohio
(1983–1991)

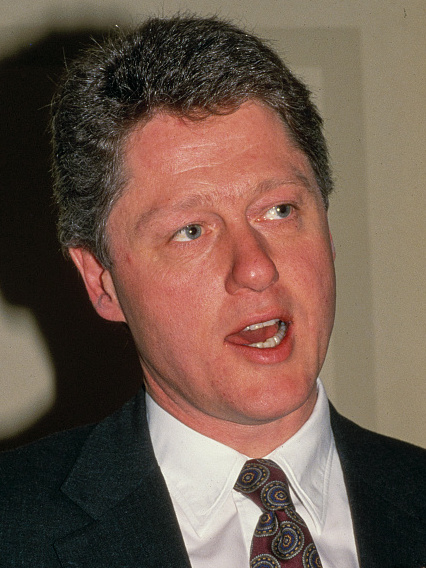
Governor
Bill Clinton
of Arkansas
(1979–1981;1983–1992)

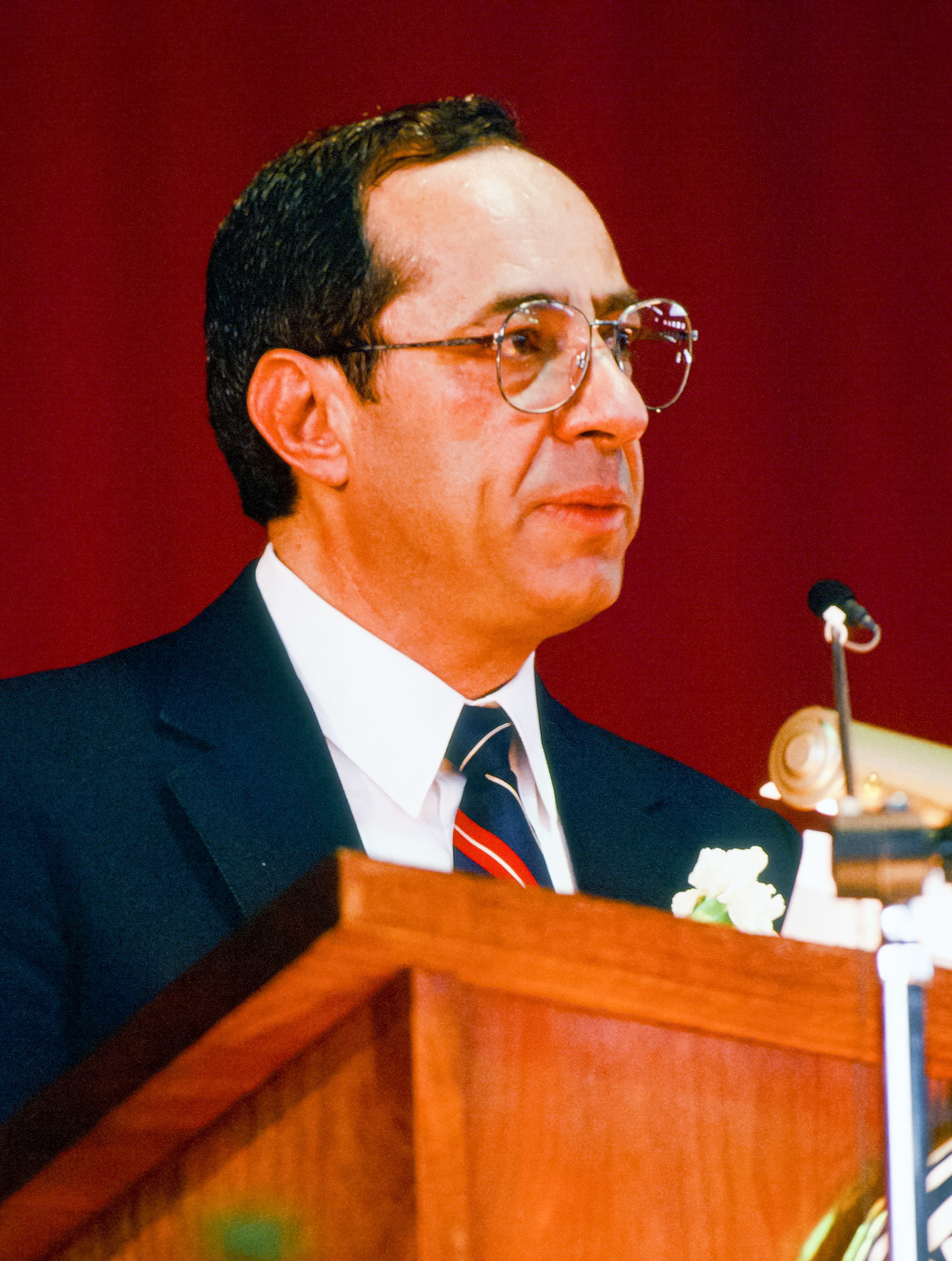
Governor
Mario Cuomo
of New York
(1983–1994)

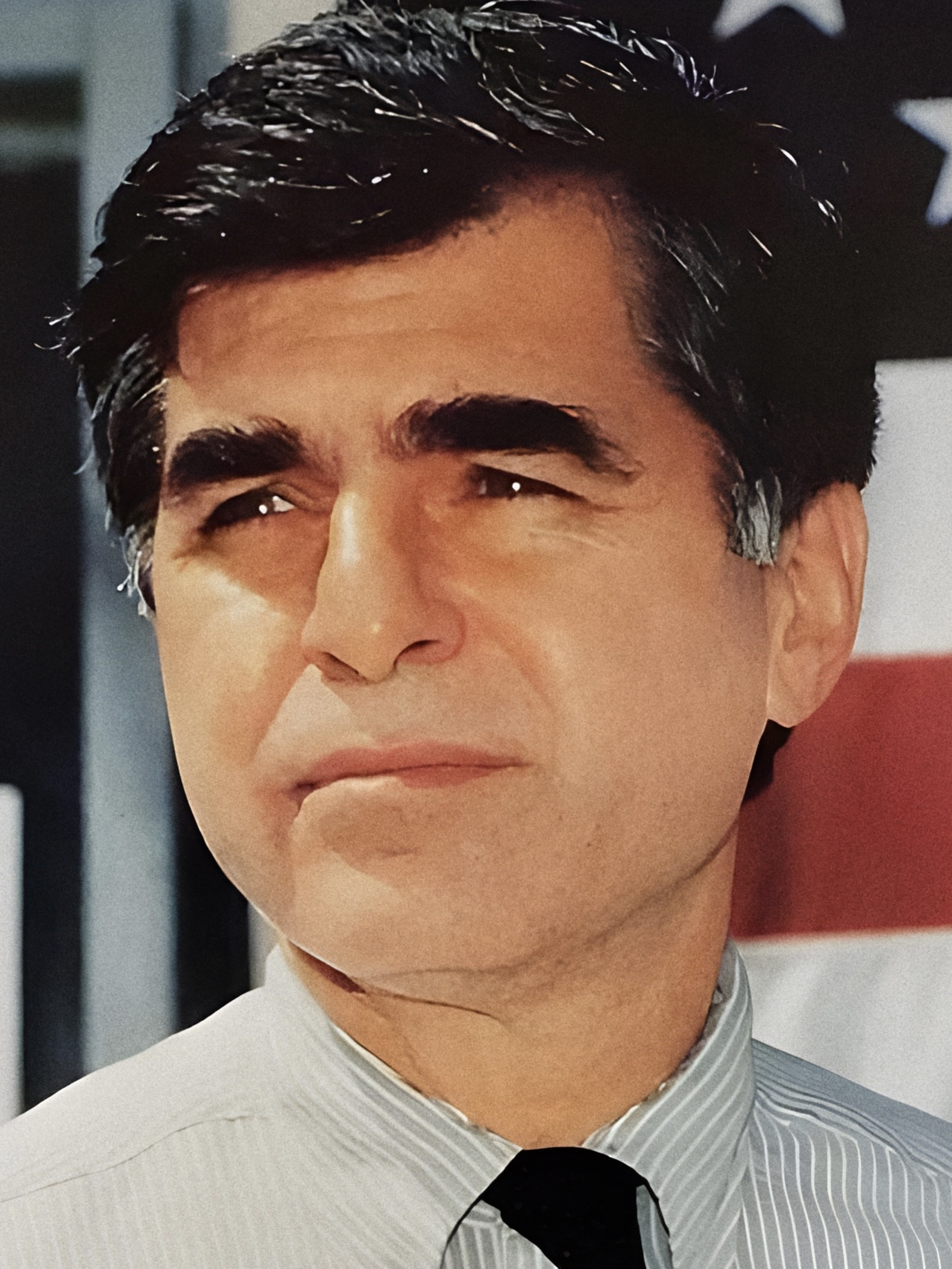
Governor
Michael Dukakis
of Massachusetts
(1975–1979;1983–1991)

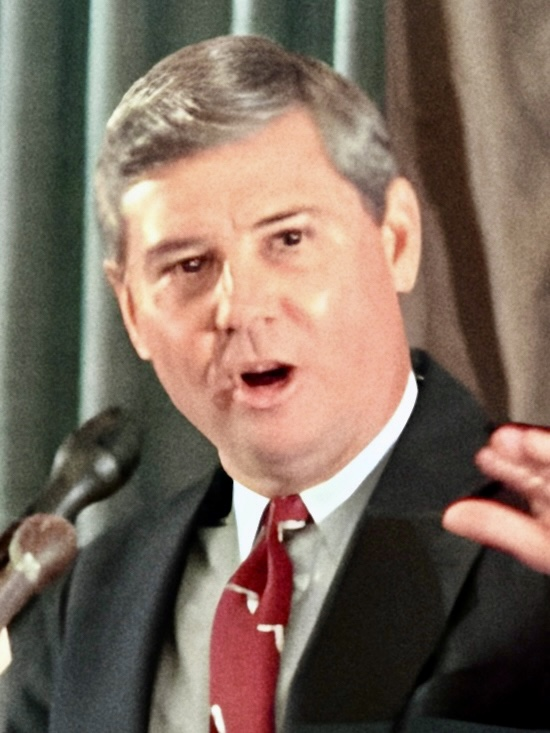
Governor
Bob Graham
of Florida
(1979–1987)

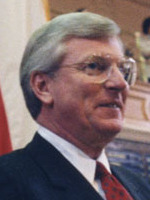
Governor
Mark White
of Texas
(1983–1987)

Other Individuals

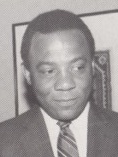
Mayor of Philadelphia
Wilson Goode
from Pennsylvania
(1984–1992)

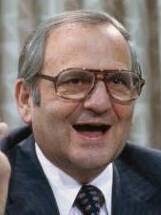
Chairman of Chrysler
Lee Iacocca
from Michigan
(1979–1992)

== See also ==
- Walter Mondale 1984 presidential campaign
- 1984 Democratic Party presidential primaries
- 1984 Democratic National Convention
- 1984 United States presidential election
- List of United States major party presidential tickets

== Works cited ==
- Ranney, Austin, ed. (1985). The American Elections of 1984. Duke University Press. ISBN 0822302306.
