= Tip O'Neill =

American politician (1912–1994)

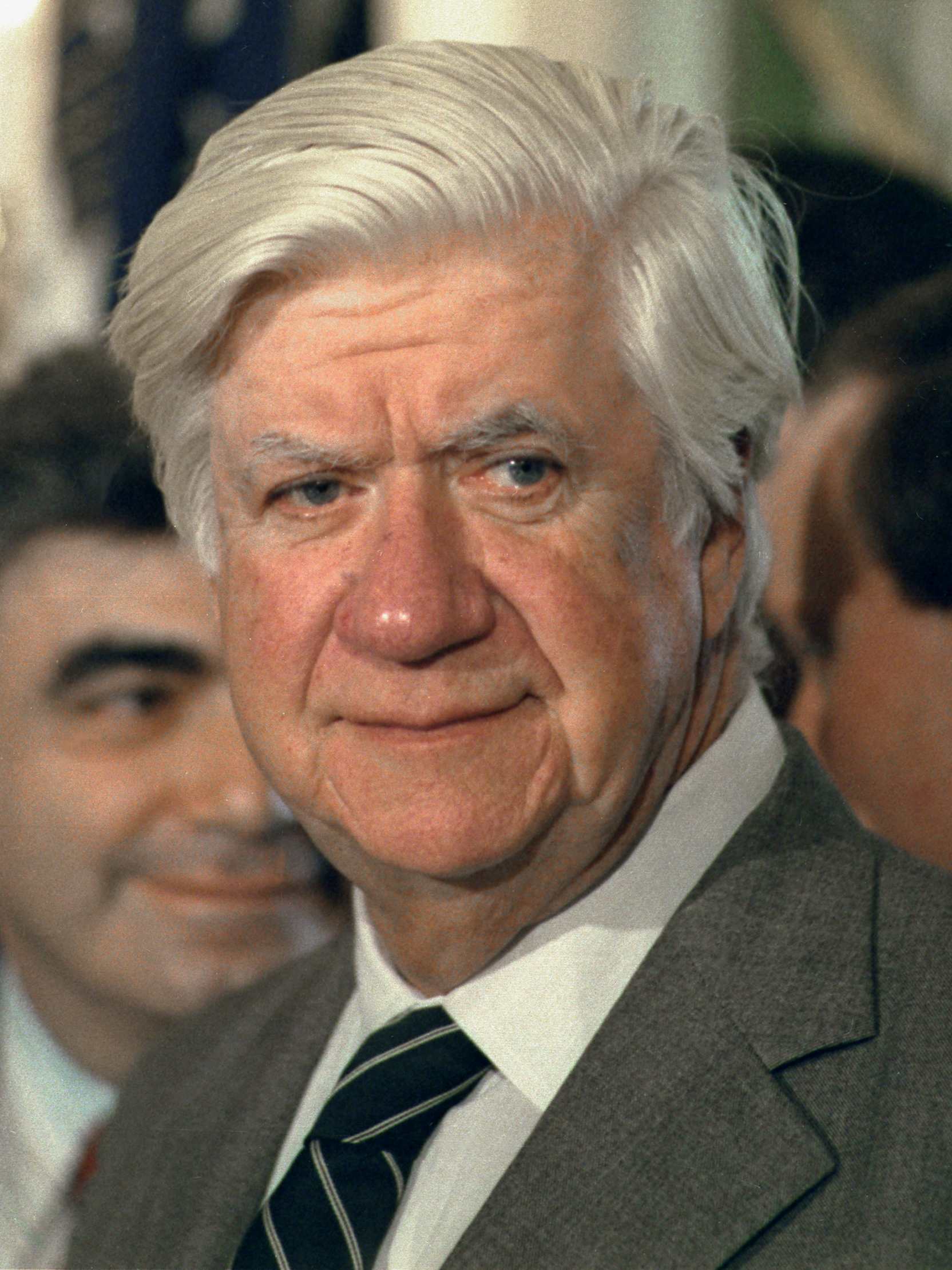
- O'Neill in 1978

47th Speaker of the United States House of Representatives
- In office January 4, 1977 – January 3, 1987
- Preceded by: Carl Albert
- Succeeded by: Jim Wright
House positions
Leader of the House Democratic Caucus
In office January 4, 1977 – January 3, 1987
Preceded by	Carl Albert
Succeeded by	Jim Wright
House Majority Leader
In office January 3, 1973 – January 3, 1977
Deputy	John J. McFall
Speaker	Carl Albert
Preceded by	Hale Boggs
Succeeded by	Jim Wright
House Majority Whip
In office January 3, 1971 – January 3, 1973
Leader	Carl Albert
Preceded by	Hale Boggs
Succeeded by	John J. McFall

Member of the U.S. House of Representatives from Massachusetts
- In office January 3, 1953 – January 3, 1987
- Preceded by: John F. Kennedy
- Succeeded by: Joseph P. Kennedy II
- Constituency: 11th district (1953–1963); 8th district (1963–1987)

Speaker of the Massachusetts House of Representatives
- In office 1949–1953
- Preceded by: Frederick Willis
- Succeeded by: Charles Gibbons

Minority Leader of the Massachusetts House of Representatives
- In office 1947–1949
- Preceded by: John Flaherty
- Succeeded by: Charles Gibbons

Member of the Massachusetts House of Representatives from the 3rd Middlesex district
- In office 1937–1953

Personal details
- Born: Thomas Phillip O'Neill Jr. December 9, 1912 Cambridge, Massachusetts, U.S.
- Died: January 5, 1994 (aged 81) Boston, Massachusetts, U.S.
- Resting place: Mount Pleasant Cemetery, Harwich Port, Massachusetts, U.S.
- Citizenship: United States of America, Ireland
- Party: Democratic
- Spouse: Mildred Miller (m. 1941)
- Children: 5, including Thomas
- Education: Boston College (BA)
- Nickname: Tip
- Tip O'Neill's voice Tip O'Neill speaks on President Ronald Reagan's planned changes to Social Security; Recorded September 25, 1981

Thomas Phillip "Tip" O'Neill Jr. (December 9, 1912 – January 5, 1994) was an American politician from Massachusetts who served as the 47th speaker of the United States House of Representatives from 1977 to 1987, the third-longest tenure in history and the longest uninterrupted tenure. A member of the Democratic Party, he represented northern Boston in Congress from 1953 to 1987.

Born in North Cambridge, Massachusetts, O'Neill began campaigning at a young age by volunteering for Al Smith's campaign in the 1928 presidential election. After graduating from Boston College, he won election to the Massachusetts House of Representatives, where he became a strong advocate of Franklin D. Roosevelt's New Deal policies. He became Speaker of the Massachusetts House in 1949 and won election to the United States House of Representatives in 1952 to succeed John F. Kennedy.

In the U.S. House, O'Neill became a protégé of fellow Boston Representative John W. McCormack. O'Neill broke with President Lyndon B. Johnson on the Vietnam War in 1967 and called for Richard Nixon's resignation in light of the Watergate scandal. He quickly moved up the leadership ranks in the 1970s, becoming House Majority Whip in 1971, House Majority Leader in 1973, and Speaker of the House in 1977. With the election of President Jimmy Carter, O'Neill hoped to establish a universal health care system and a guaranteed jobs program. However, relations between Carter and Congress deteriorated, and Carter lost re-election in the 1980 presidential election to Ronald Reagan, a conservative Republican. O'Neill became a leading opponent of President Reagan's conservative domestic policies, but O'Neill and Reagan found common ground in foreign policy, fostering the Anglo-Irish Agreement and implementing the Reagan Doctrine (despite considerable opposition to Reagan's support for the Contras in Nicaragua) during the Cold War.

O'Neill retired from Congress in 1987 but remained active in public life. He published a best-selling autobiography and appeared in several commercials and other media. He died of cardiac arrest in 1994.

== Early life and education ==
Thomas Phillip O'Neill Jr. was the youngest of three children born to Thomas Phillip O'Neill Sr. and Rose Ann (née Tolan) O'Neill in the Irish middle-class area of North Cambridge, Massachusetts on December 9, 1912, known at the time as "Old Dublin." His mother died when he was nine months old, and he was raised largely by a French-Canadian housekeeper until his father remarried when he was eight in 1921. O'Neill Sr. started out as a bricklayer, and later won a seat on the Cambridge City Council and was appointed Superintendent of Sewers. During his childhood, O'Neill received the nickname "Tip" after the Canadian baseball player James "Tip" O'Neill. He was educated in Roman Catholic schools, graduating in 1931 from the now defunct St. John High School in Cambridge, where he was captain of the basketball team; he was a lifelong parishioner at the school's affiliated parish church St. John the Evangelist Church. From there he went to Boston College, from which he graduated in 1936.

== Entry into politics ==
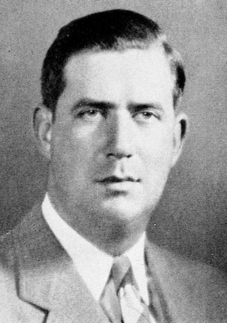
O'Neill in 1945

O'Neill first became active in politics at 15, campaigning for Al Smith in his 1928 presidential campaign. Four years later, he helped campaign for Franklin D. Roosevelt. As a senior at Boston College, O'Neill unsuccessfully ran for a seat on the Cambridge City Council. This was his first race and only electoral defeat. The campaign taught him that "All politics is local."

After graduating in 1936, O'Neill was elected at the age of 24 to the Massachusetts House of Representatives, aided by tough economic times among his constituents; the experience made him a strong advocate of the New Deal policies of Roosevelt, which were just then coming to an end. His biographer John Aloysius Farrell said his background in Depression-era working-class Boston, and his interpretation of his Catholic faith, led O'Neill to view the role of government as intervening to cure social ailments. O'Neill was "an absolute, unrepentant, unreconstructed New Deal Democrat," Farrell wrote.

In 1949, he became the first Democratic Speaker of the Massachusetts House of Representatives in its history. He remained in that post until 1952, when he ran for the United States House of Representatives from his home district.

== U.S. House of Representatives ==
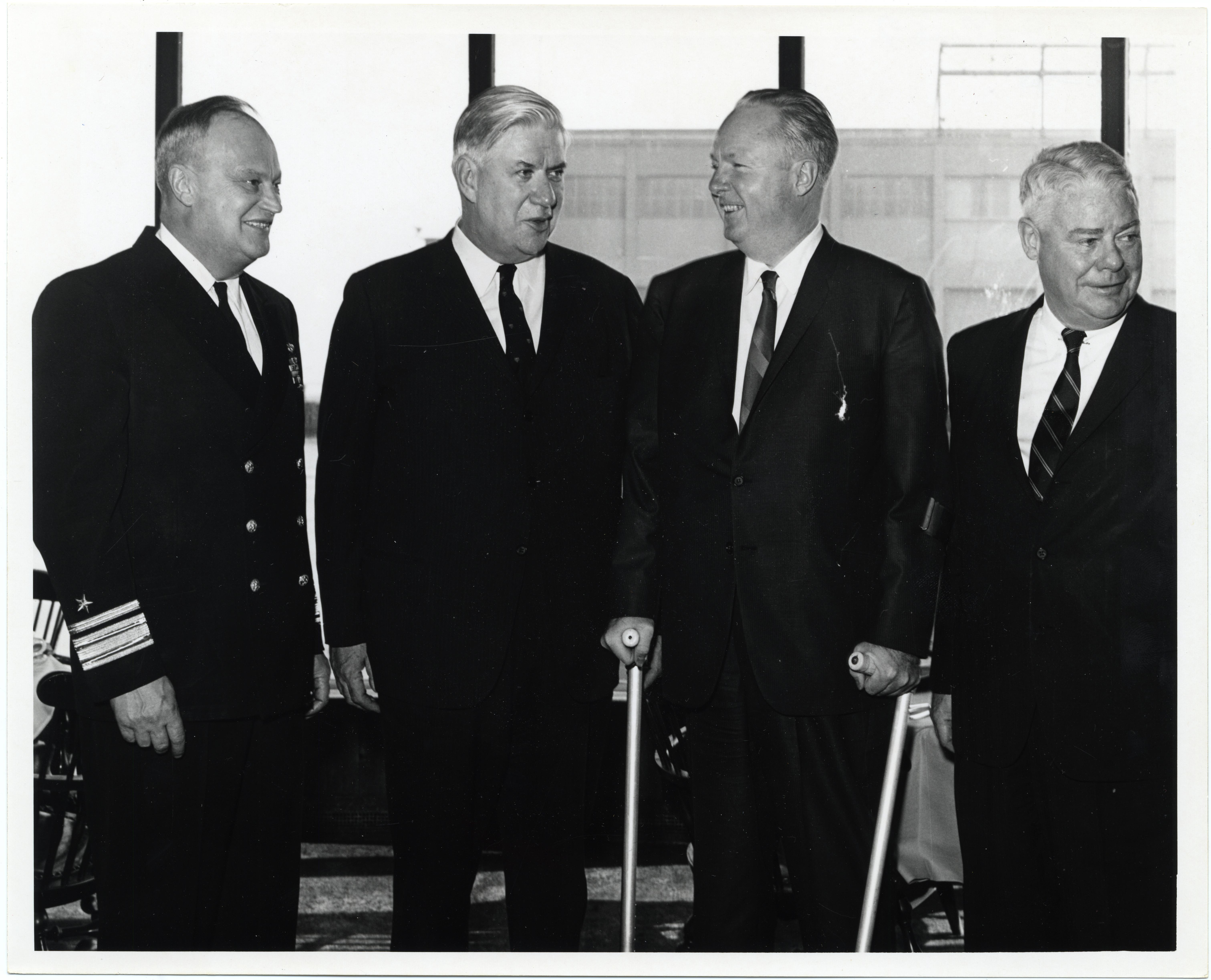
O'Neill with Boston Mayor John F. Collins (1960–1968).

O'Neill was elected to the congressional seat vacated by Senator-elect John F. Kennedy in 1952. He would be reelected 16 more times, never facing serious opposition. His district, centered around the northern half of Boston, was originally numbered as the 11th District, but became the 8th District in 1963.

During his second term in the House, O'Neill was selected to the House Rules Committee where he proved a crucial asset for the Democratic leadership, particularly his mentor, fellow Boston congressman and later Speaker, John William McCormack. O'Neill voted in favor of the Civil Rights Acts of 1957, 1960, 1964, and 1968, as well as the 24th Amendment to the U.S. Constitution and the Voting Rights Act of 1965. He also voted in favor of the Clean Air Act of 1963. O'Neill voted against the Alaska Statehood Act but in favor of the Hawaii Admission Act.

After wrestling with the issues surrounding the Vietnam War, in 1967 O'Neill broke with President Lyndon B. Johnson and came out in opposition to America's involvement. O'Neill wrote in his autobiography that he also became convinced that the conflict in Vietnam was a civil war and that US involvement was morally wrong. While the decision cost O'Neill some support among older voters in his home district, he benefited from new support among students and faculty members at the many colleges and universities there. In the House of Representatives itself, O'Neill picked up the trust and support of younger House members who shared his antiwar views, and they became important friends who contributed to O'Neill's rise through the ranks in the House.

In 1971, O'Neill was appointed Majority Whip in the House, the number three position for the Democratic Party in the House. Two years later, in 1973, he was elected House Majority Leader, following the disappearance of a small plane carrying Majority Leader Hale Boggs and Congressman Nick Begich in Alaska. As Majority Leader, O'Neill was the most prominent Democrat in the House to call for the impeachment of President Richard M. Nixon in light of the Watergate scandal.

== Speaker of the House ==
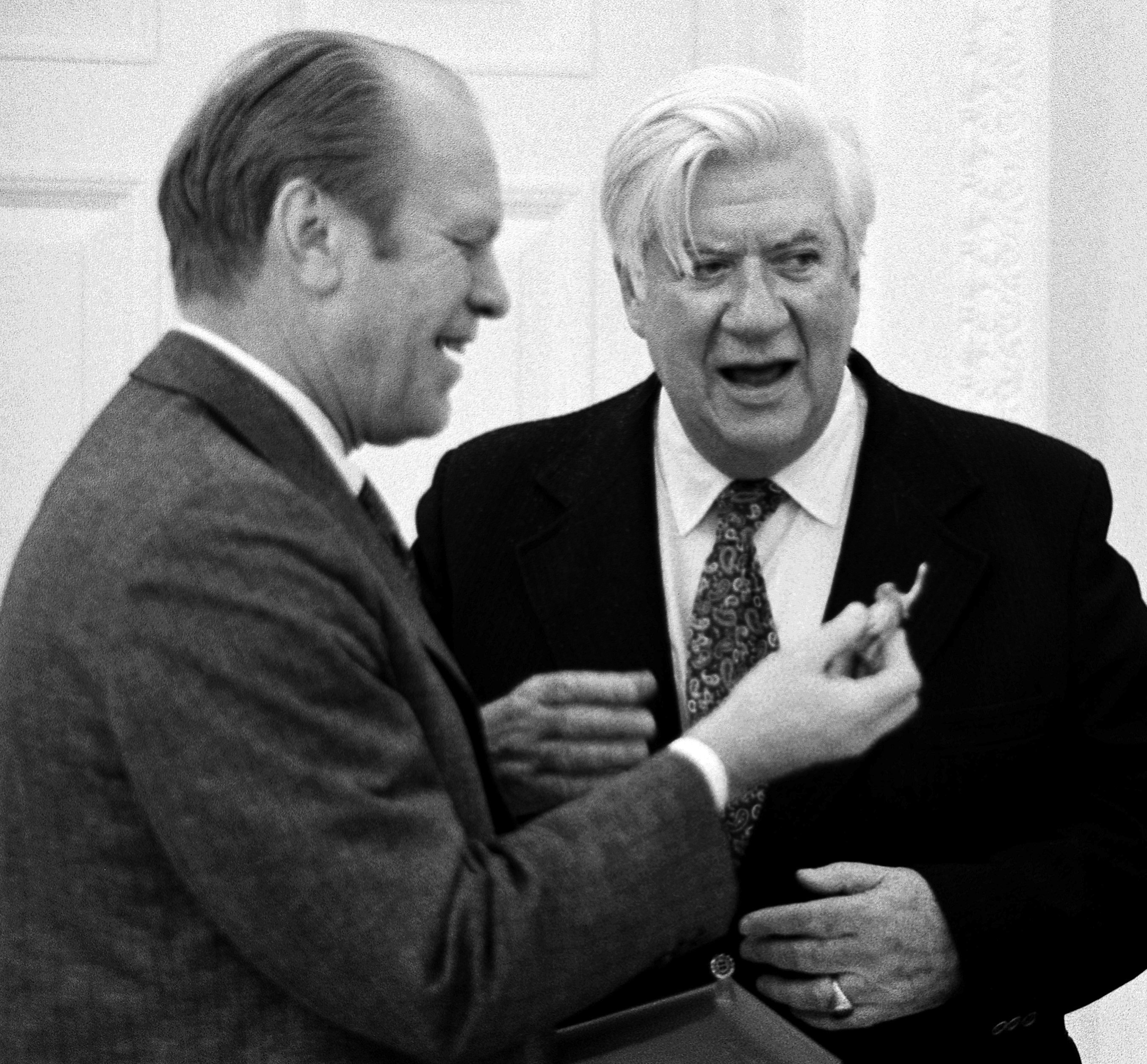
O'Neill with President Gerald Ford, 1976

=== Election as Speaker and Congressional Ethics ===
As a result of the Tongsun Park influence-peddling scandal, House Speaker Carl Albert retired from Congress and O'Neill was elected speaker in 1977, the same year that Jimmy Carter became president.

O'Neill was elected Speaker on January 4, 1977. Immediately after his election, he emphasized that Congress had reasserted itself as a co-equal branch of government with the War Powers Resolution and its new budget process after decades of growing executive power, but also said Congress would work in "partnership" with the incoming Carter Administration. He said "Common sense and the Constitution demand that Pennsylvania Avenue remain a two way street."

Tongsun Park had not directly paid O'Neill, although Park's parties in his honor and a new scandal involving a nursing home in which O'Neill had invested $5,000 as a small-business loan in violation of federal law raised questions of impropriety, but did not prevent his reelection.

Shortly after becoming Speaker in January 1977, O'Neill supported a commission led by Dave Obey (D-WI) to tighten Congressional Ethic rules. Later, in October 1977, a special rule that prevented amendments to an ambitious ethics reform package supported by O'Neill was defeated by a unanimous House Republican Caucus and a sizable minority of Democrats. This was in part due to opposition towards proposed administrative changes to committee staff and member offices. The Obey Commission's measures on financial disclosure and limits on outside income would later be successfully included in the Ethics in Government Act of 1978, which passed with the support of O'Neill and an overwhelming bipartisan majority in the House. Congressional Quarterly wrote: "That those recommendations passed the House very nearly intact was a personal victory for Speaker Thomas P. O'Neill Jr" who had to whip members of his own party who been "on the verge of rebellion."

=== Carter administration ===
With substantial majorities in both houses of Congress and control of the White House, O'Neill hoped that Democrats would be able to implement their legislation, including universal health care and guaranteed jobs programs. However, the Democrats lacked party discipline, and while the Carter administration and O'Neill started out strong with the passage of ethics and energy packages in 1977, there were major stumbles. Troubles began with Carter's threats to veto a water-projects bill, a pet project of many members of Congress. O'Neill and other Democratic leaders were also upset by Carter's appointments of a number of his fellow Georgians, whom O'Neill considered arrogant and parochial, to federal offices and White House staff.

O'Neill was also dismayed by Carter's frugal behavior in cutting executive staff and reducing the scale of White House entertainment. Carter even ended the practice of serving hard liquor at the White House to guests as a cost cutting measure. As Carter's term began in early 1977, Democratic leaders on Capitol Hill were invited to the White House for a breakfast where Carter served them coffee, juice, and a roll, until O'Neill requested a full breakfast with eggs and pork for meetings that started before 9:00 AM. Carter was a reform-minded executive who often clashed with O'Neill on legislation. O'Neill wanted to reward loyal Democrats with projects at a time when Carter wanted to reduce government spending. A continually weakening economy and the Iran hostage crisis made prospects bleak for Carter and the Democrats in the 1980 congressional and presidential elections.

=== Reagan administration ===
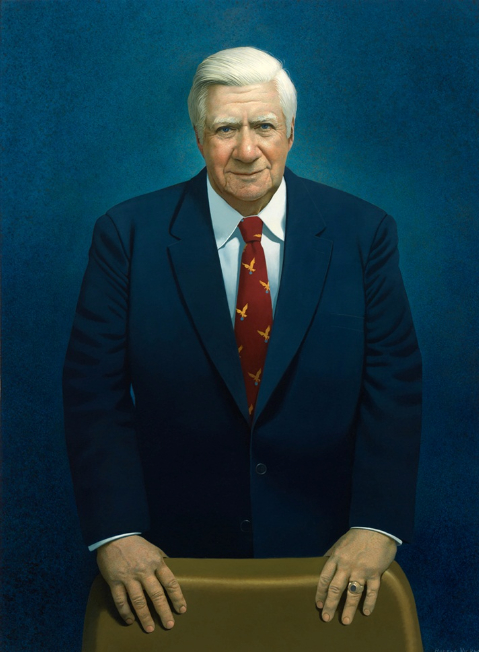
Painting of O'Neill made in 1986

O'Neill was a leading opponent of the Reagan administration's domestic and defense policies. Following the 1980 election, with the U.S. Senate controlled by Republicans, O'Neill became the leader of the congressional opposition. O'Neill even went as far as calling Ronald Reagan "the most ignorant man who had ever occupied the White House," "Herbert Hoover with a smile", and "a cheerleader for selfishness." He also said that Reagan's policies meant that his presidency was "one big Christmas party for the rich." Privately, O'Neill and Reagan were always on cordial terms, or, as Reagan wrote in his memoirs, they were friends "after 6 p.m." In that same memoir, when questioned by Reagan regarding a personal attack against the president that had made the paper, O'Neill explained that "before 6 p.m. it's all politics." Reagan once compared O'Neill to the classic arcade game Pac-Man in a speech, saying that he was "a round thing that gobbles up money." He also once joked he had received a valentine card from O'Neill: "I knew it was from Tip, because the heart was bleeding."

However, O'Neill gave tacit approval to Democratic congressman Charlie Wilson to implement the Reagan Doctrine in the Soviet-Afghan war. Wilson's position on the appropriations committees, and his close relations with CIA officer Gust Avrakotos, allowed him to steer billions of dollars to the Mujahideen through the CIA and Zia ul-Haq's ISI.

There was some contention about constitutional order of succession, which involved O'Neill, when Reagan was shot in March 1981. Secretary of State Alexander Haig famously said that he was "in control here" in response to a question as to who was in charge (with the president under anesthesia and Vice President George Bush traveling), but it was later pointed out that O'Neill was next in line after Bush. Reagan was only unconscious for a few hours, and no formal invocation of the line of succession took place.

On October 21, 1986, O'Neill, representing President Reagan, threw out the ceremonial first pitch at Game 3 of the 1986 World Series, played at Fenway Park.

=== Northern Ireland ===
One of O'Neill's accomplishments as speaker involved Northern Ireland. O'Neill worked with fellow Irish-American politicians New York governor Hugh Carey, Senator Edward Kennedy, and Senator Daniel Patrick Moynihan to craft a peace accord between the warring factions. Beginning with the "Saint Patrick's Day declaration" in 1977, denouncing violence in Northern Ireland and culminating with the Irish aid package upon the signing of the Anglo-Irish Agreement in 1985, the "Four Horsemen", as they were called, convinced both Carter and Reagan to press the UK government on the subject. In 1981, O'Neill also created the Friends of Ireland with Kennedy and Moynihan, an organization to promote peace in Northern Ireland.

O'Neill was made an honorary Irish citizen, which granted citizenship, by the Republic of Ireland in 1986.

== Post-speakership ==
O'Neill with Congresswoman and future four-term Speaker Nancy Pelosi

After retiring from Congress in 1987, O'Neill published his autobiography, Man of the House. Though it had a mixed reception by critics it became a national best-seller. The book also helped turn him into a national icon, and O'Neill starred in a number of commercials, including those for Trump Shuttle, Commodore Computers, Quality International Budget Hotels and for Miller Lite, in which he appeared with Bob Uecker. Critics, however, noted some inaccuracies with his book: his views of the Grenada invasion conflicting with his public opinions of the time; David Powers questioning that John F. Kennedy's aide Kenneth O'Donnell allegedly heard more shots during his assassination in a conversation with O'Neill; and Senator Barbara Mikulski saying that "Tip has his memoirs mixed up," regarding opposition towards O'Neill endorsing Geraldine Ferraro in the 1984 vice presidential election.

In 1987, O'Neill received the Freedom Medal.

On November 18, 1991, O'Neill was presented with the Presidential Medal of Freedom by President George H. W. Bush.

In retirement, O'Neill, who suffered from colon cancer, made public service advertisements about cancer in which he joined athletes and movie stars in talking candidly about having the disease.

== In popular culture ==
O'Neill was referenced as an example of physical humor in the Star Trek: The Next Generation episode "The Outrageous Okona" when a holographic comedian names O'Neill and posits that him wearing a dress would qualify as funny. This is the result of the android Data trying to gain a comprehension of comedy, a talent that he does not possess.

Four years before his retirement, O'Neill had a cameo role in the February 17, 1983, episode of Cheers entitled "No Contest," which featured him ducking into the bar to escape Diane Chambers, who had pestered him on the street about his political ideals. The show, which was ranked 60th in the Nielsen ratings at that time, jumped 20 places the following week. He appeared in an episode of the NBC sitcom Silver Spoons, which featured him delivering a mock press conference praising recurring character Freddy Lippincottleman's efforts on behalf of the homeless. O'Neill also made a brief appearance in the 1993 film Dave as himself, assessing the work of the fictional American president in the movie. He also voiced narration for a segment of the Ken Burns series Baseball in which O'Neill, a lifelong Red Sox fan, read The Boston Globe from the day the Red Sox won the 1918 World Series.

In the comic strip Shoe, the character Sen. Batson D. Belfry is modeled after O'Neill.

O'Neill was portrayed by Dan Lauria in the 2024 film Reagan.

== Personal life ==
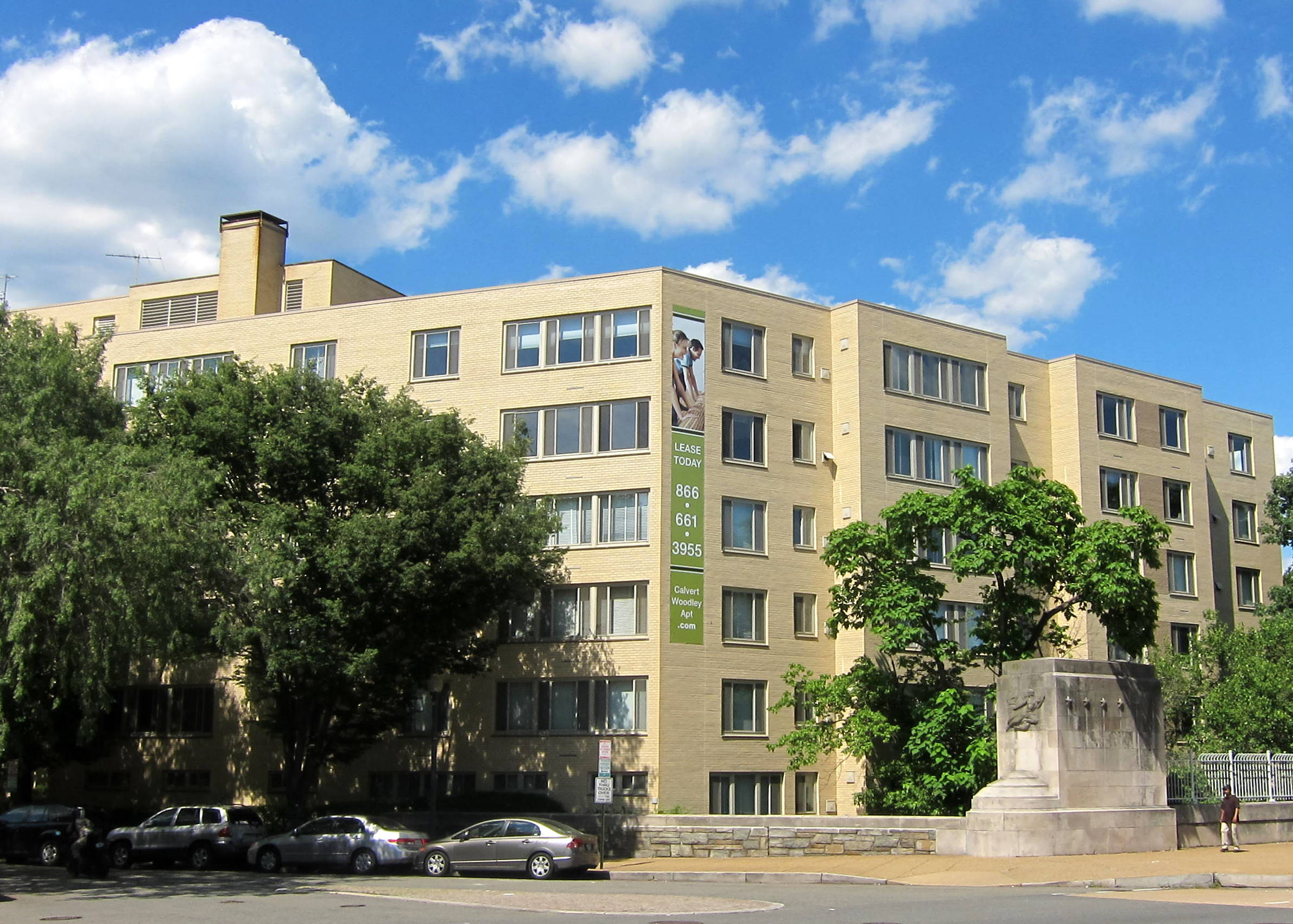
O'Neill's Washington, D.C., residence from 1964 to 1978

O'Neill resided on 26 Russell Street in North Cambridge. He had lived as a child around the corner on Orchard St. He had a vacation home on Woodland Rd. near Bank Street Beach in Harwich Port, Massachusetts. His wife was Mildred "Millie" Anne Miller (1914–2003). They had five children. His oldest son and namesake, Thomas P. O'Neill III, a former lieutenant governor of Massachusetts, works in public relations in Boston. Another son, Christopher, is a Washington lawyer. His third son, Michael, is deceased. Daughter Susan has a business in Washington, D.C., and the other daughter, Rosemary (died July 20, 2022) was a political officer for the State Department.

In 1980, O'Neill was awarded the Laetare Medal by the University of Notre Dame, considered the most prestigious award for American Catholics.

=== Death and legacy ===
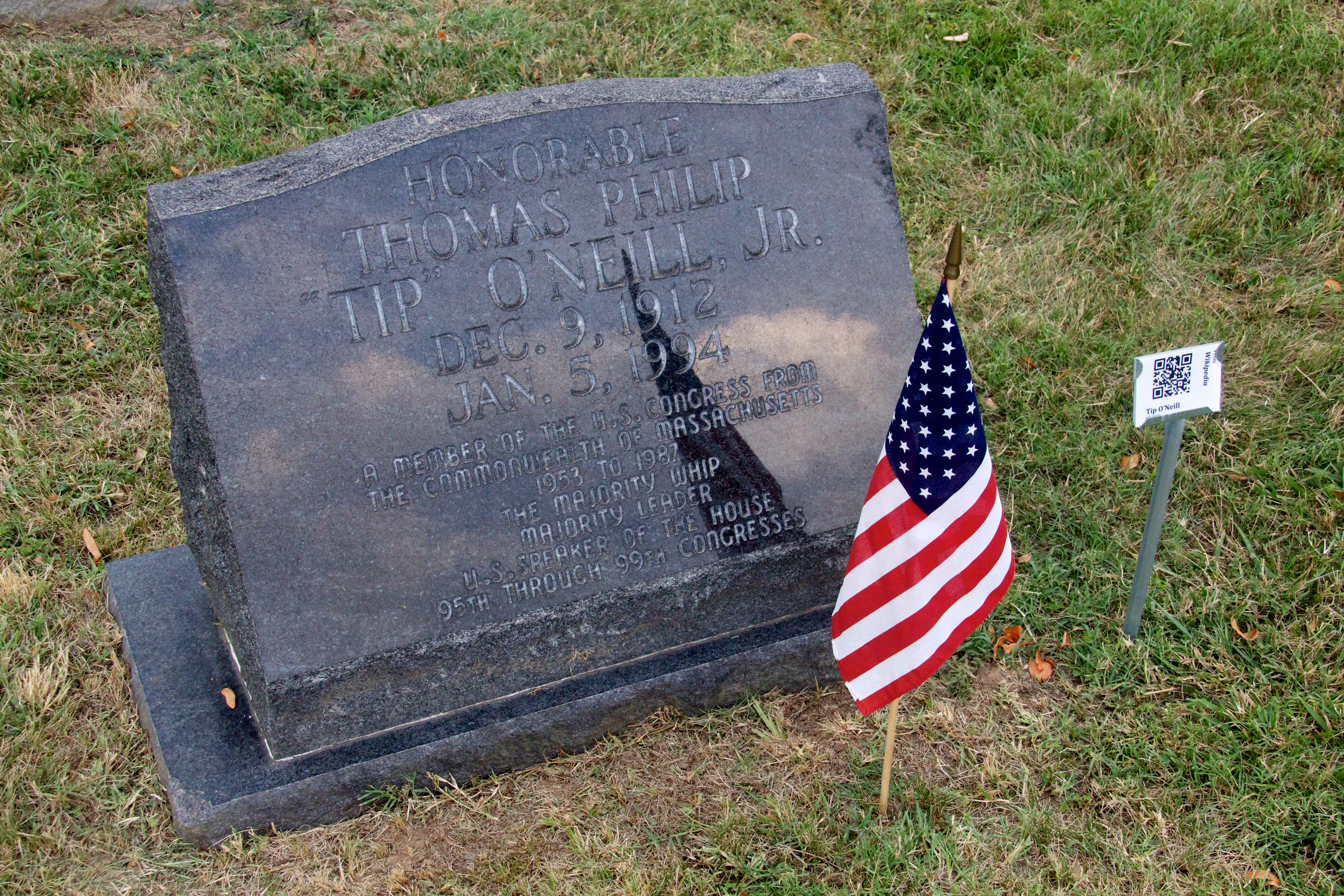
O'Neill's cenotaph at the Congressional Cemetery, Washington, D.C.

O'Neill died from cardiac arrest at Brigham and Women's Hospital in Boston on January 5, 1994, at the age of 81. President Bill Clinton paid tribute to him, saying, "Tip O'Neill was the nation's most prominent, powerful and loyal champion of working people... He loved politics and government because he saw that politics and government could make a difference in people's lives. And he loved people most of all." Millie died in 2003 and is buried near her husband, at Mount Pleasant Cemetery in Harwich Port, Massachusetts.

The Thomas P. O'Neill Jr. Tunnel, built through downtown Boston as part of the Big Dig to carry Interstate 93 under Boston, was named after him. Other structures named after him include a House Office Building, the O'Neill Branch of the Cambridge Public Library (including an outdoor mural), the Thomas P. O'Neill Jr. Federal Building in Boston, a federal office building in Washington, D.C., a golf course in Cambridge (since renamed), and the main library (and the plaza in front of it) at his alma mater, Boston College.

On June 22, 2008, the play According to Tip debuted in Watertown, Massachusetts, produced by the New Repertory Theatre. The one-man biographical play, written by longtime Boston sportswriter Dick Flavin, features O'Neill telling stories of his life, from his childhood to after his retirement in politics. Tony Award winner Ken Howard played the title role in the premiere production.

In December 2012, the John F. Kennedy Presidential Library and Museum hosted a forum to celebrate the centennial of O'Neill's birth. O'Neill himself contributed several oral history interviews to its archives chronicling his work for the Democratic party and friendship with President Kennedy.

== See also ==
- Electoral history of Tip O'Neill

== Books ==
- O'Neill, Thomas P.; Novak, William (1987). Man of the House: The Life and Political Memoirs of Speaker Tip O'Neill. Random House. ISBN 978-0-394-56505-7.
- O'Neill, Thomas P.; Hymel, Gary (1994). All Politics Is Local and Other Rules of the Game. Holbrook, Mass.: Bob Adams, Inc. ISBN 9781558504707. OCLC 1042095400.

Massachusetts House of Representatives
Preceded by Frederick Willis	Speaker of the Massachusetts House of Representatives; 1949–1953	Succeeded by Charles Gibbons
U.S. House of Representatives
Preceded by John F. Kennedy	Member of the U.S. House of Representatives from Massachusetts's 11th congressional district 1953–1963	Succeeded by James Burke
Preceded by Torbert Macdonald	Member of the U.S. House of Representatives from Massachusetts's 8th congressional district 1963–1987	Succeeded by Joseph P. Kennedy II
Preceded by Clifford Davis	Chair of the House Campaign Expenditures Committee; 1965–1973	Succeeded by Neal Edward Smith
Preceded by Hale Boggs	House Majority Whip; 1971–1973	Succeeded by John J. McFall
Preceded by Hale Boggs	House Majority Leader; 1973–1977	Succeeded by Jim Wright
Party political offices
Preceded by Hale Boggs	House Democratic Deputy Leader; 1971–1973	Succeeded by John J. McFall
Preceded by Hale Boggs	House Democratic Leader; 1973–1977	Succeeded by Jim Wright
Vacant Title last held by Ted Stevens; John Rhodes	Response to the State of the Union address 1982, 1983, 1984, 1985; Served alongside: Robert Byrd, Alan Cranston, Al Gore, Gary Hart, Bennett Johnston, Ted Kennedy, Don Riegle, Paul Sarbanes, Jim Sasser (1982), Les AuCoin, Joe Biden, Bill Bradley, Robert Byrd, Tom Daschle, Bill Hefner, Barbara B. Kennelly, George Miller, Paul Tsongas, Tim Wirth (1983), Max Baucus, Joe Biden, David L. Boren, Barbara Boxer, Robert Byrd, Dante Fascell, Bill Gray, Tom Harkin, Dee Huddleston, Carl Levin, Claiborne Pell (1984), Bill Clinton, Bob Graham (1985)	Succeeded by Tom Daschle, Bill Gray, George Mitchell, Chuck Robb, Harriett Woods
Political offices
Preceded by Carl Albert	Speaker of the U.S. House of Representatives; 1977–1987	Succeeded by Jim Wright
