= Signature Theatre (Arlington, Virginia) =

Theater in Arlington, Virginia

- Formation: 1989
- Type: Theatre group
- Purpose: contemporary musicals & plays, classic musicals, new works
- Location: Arlington County, Virginia
- Coordinates: 38°50′27.2″N 77°5′24.38″W
- Artistic director: Matthew Gardiner
- Website: https://www.sigtheatre.org/

Signature Theatre is a Tony Award-winning regional theater company based in Arlington, Virginia.

Cameron Mackintosh, Terrence McNally, James Lapine, John Kander, and Fred Ebb are among those that have presented works here. Since 1991, Signature has had a long relationship with Stephen Sondheim, having staged more than 30 productions of his musicals, revues and concerts—more than any other professional theater in the country.

== History and Facilities ==
Signature Theatre was founded in 1989 by Eric D. Schaeffer and Donna Migliaccio with Schaeffer serving as artistic director from the company's founding until his resignation on June 23, 2020, amidst multiple allegations of sexual harassment and assault.

=== Gunston ===
Signature began production in the Arlington County Gunston Arts Center. This original venue was in the library of a middle school which had been converted to a black box theater.

=== The Garage ===
Having rapidly outgrown the Gunston facility, Signature in 1993 acquired a defunct Auto Bumper Plating shop, AKA "The Garage", which was converted into a 136-seat black box theatre.

=== Shirlington ===
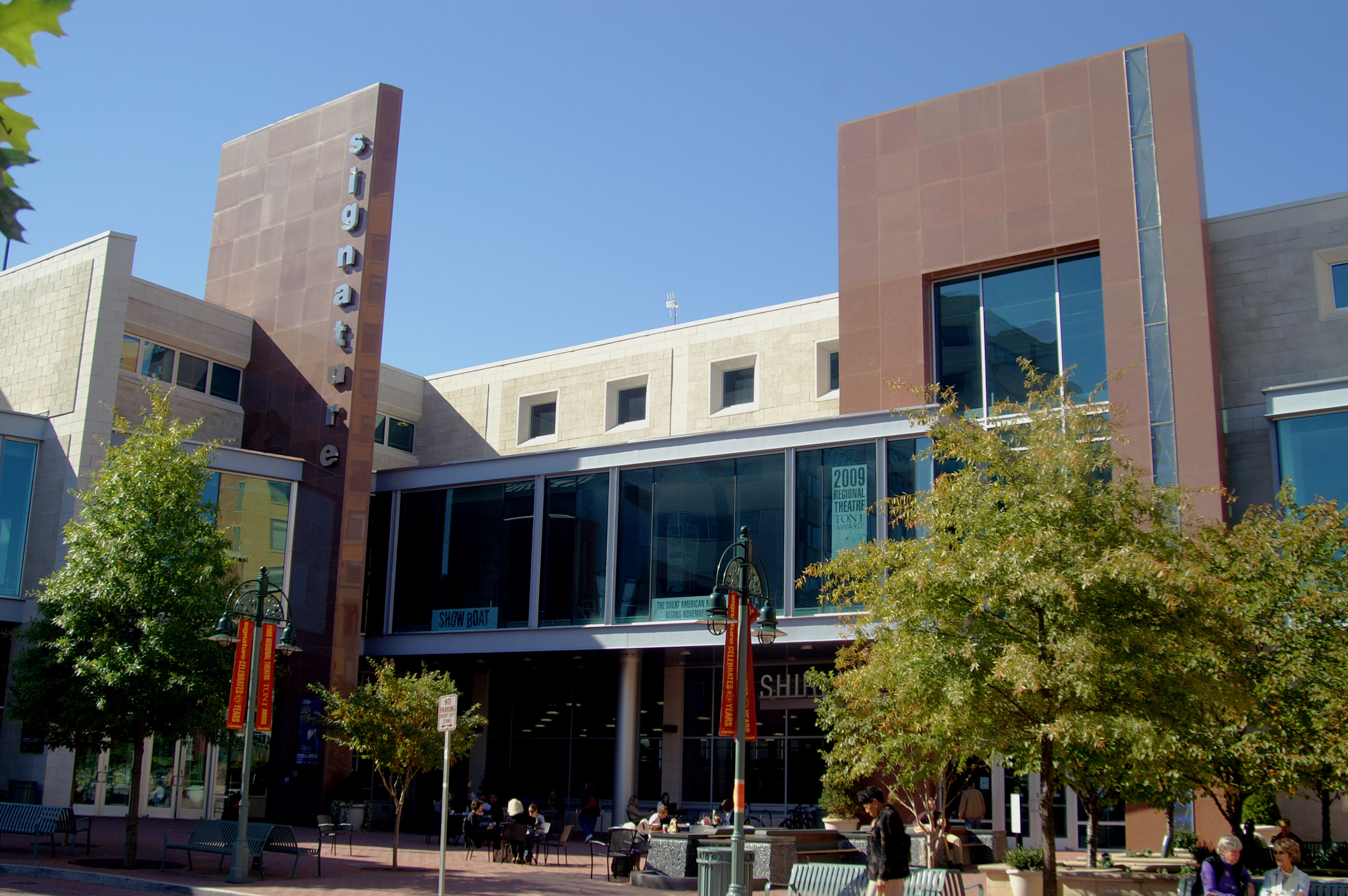
Exterior of Signature Theatre

In 2007, in partnership with Arlington County, Virginia, Signature moved into its current facility, a $16 million theater complex in The Village at Shirlington. The first floor of the building houses the Shirlington Branch of the Arlington County Public Library, the upper three floors house the theater. The complex has an industrial decor with exposed particle board, pipes and metal sheeting. The pair of state-of-the-art black box theaters are each built as a "square box within a square box, floating on hockey pucks. At $30 a puck. It is built like a soundstage."

- The Max — the larger of two flexible theatre spaces, named in honor of Maxine Isaacs, seats between 275 and 350 patrons.
- The Ark — the smaller theatre space, seating up to 99 patrons, named in honor of Arlene and Robert Kogod.

In addition to the two performance spaces, the complex contains a lobby, meeting rooms, three rehearsal spaces, four individual dressing rooms, three shared dressing rooms, three showers, a cast greenroom, a separate orchestra greenroom, three kitchen areas, scene, prop, and costume shops. The large lobby was named by donors Gilbert and Jaylee Mead in honor of Gilbert's late son Rob Mead.

On June 7, 2009, Signature received theater’s highest artistic honor – the 2009 Regional Theatre Tony Award – in recognition of artistic excellence.

== Stephen Sondheim Award ==
In 2009 the Theatre established the Stephen Sondheim Award to honor "those who have contributed to the works of Stephen Sondheim and the canon of American Musical Theater." The inaugural award was presented on April 27, 2009, to its namesake at a benefit gala featuring performances by Bernadette Peters, Michael Cerveris, Will Gartshore and Eleasha Gamble. The award has since been presented at the Theatre's annual Sondheim Award Gala excepting a hiatus in 2020 and 2021 due to the COVID-19 pandemic.

=== Past Recipients ===
Year	Recipient
2009	Stephen Sondheim
2010	Angela Lansbury
2011	Bernadette Peters
2012	Patti LuPone
2013	Harold "Hal" Prince
2014	Jonathan Tunick
2015	James Lapine
2016	John Weidman
2017	Cameron Mackintosh
2018	John Kander
2019	Audra McDonald
2022	Carol Burnett
2023	Chita Rivera
2024	Nathan Lane
2025	Mandy Patinkin

== Student Intensive Programs ==
The Overtures program is an intensive program Signature Theatre offers annual during the summer. Over the course of two weeks, students looking to pursue a career in theatre receive personal feedback to further their skills in musical theatre such as singing, dancing, acting, and audition techniques. The intensive ends with a performance in which participants showcase their performance skills for a live audience; as well as an audition with local casting directors to utilize the audition techniques learned.

The age range this program is designed for is primarily college students and newly graduated professionals. Stage One is their musical theatre intensive program for high school students (age 14-17)

== Awards ==
- 2009 – Regional Theatre Tony Award
- 2009 Outstanding Resident Musical – Les Misérables.
- 2006 Outstanding Resident Musical – Urinetown.
- 2005 Outstanding Resident Musical – Allegro.
- 2001 Outstanding Resident Musical – Side Show.
- 1999 Outstanding Resident Play – Nijinsky's Last Dance.
- 1997 Outstanding Resident Musical – Passion.
- 1995 Outstanding Resident Musical – Into the Woods.
- 1993 Outstanding Resident Musical – Assassins.
- 1992 Outstanding Resident Musical – Sweeney Todd.

== See also ==
- Helen Hayes Award
- Theater in Washington, D.C.
