= John R. Reilly =

American lawyer

John Richard Reilly (June 4, 1928 – October 12, 2008) was an adviser to a number of Democratic Party presidents and presidential candidates.

Reilly was born in Dubuque, Iowa, on June 4, 1928, as the only child of William and Stella Reilly. He received an undergraduate degree from the University of Iowa in 1952 and was granted a law degree in 1955. After his graduation from law school, Reilly was hired as an attorney working in the antitrust division of the United States Department of Justice. He joined John F. Kennedy's 1960 presidential campaign and was hired as an aide by Attorney General of the United States Robert F. Kennedy.

Reilly was given the assignment by the Kennedy administration to attend the speech delivered by Martin Luther King Jr. on August 28, 1963, on the steps of the Lincoln Memorial as part of the March on Washington for Jobs and Freedom. Roger Mudd reported that Reilly told him that he was positioned on the steps of the Lincoln Memorial with a switch that would be used to cut off Dr. King's I Have a Dream speech "if the rhetoric got too inflammatory". A turntable with a 78-rpm recording of Mahalia Jackson's He's Got the Whole World in His Hands was on standby, having been selected in advance by Reilly.

As a member of the Federal Trade Commission in June 1964, Reilly was one of three commissioners who voted in the majority to require that cigarette manufacturers "clearly and prominently" place a warning on packages of cigarettes effective January 1, 1965, stating that smoking is dangerous to health, in line with the warning issued by a special committee formed by the Surgeon General of the United States Luther Leonidas Terry. The same warning would be required in all cigarette advertising effective July 1, 1965.

After leaving the FTC in 1967, Reilly became a partner with the Washington, D.C., law firm of Pierson, Ball & Dowd, and was founding partner in 1972 of the Washington, D.C. office of Winston & Strawn LLP, a firm based in Chicago.

Reilly served as a campaign aide to the presidential campaigns of all three of the Kennedys; for John in 1960, Robert in 1968 and Edward in 1980. He was also a campaign aide to Edmund S. Muskie in 1972, Walter Mondale in 1984 and Joseph Biden in 1988.

Reilly was in charge of the vice presidential search process on behalf of Walter Mondale in the 1984 Presidential election that led to the selection of Geraldine Ferraro as Mondale's running mate.

His wife was Margaret Warner, a senior correspondent for The PBS NewsHour. The two were married in 1986 at a ceremony held in Ogunquit, Maine.

He died of abdominal cancer on October 12, 2008, in Washington, at the age of 80.
