= List of Peabody Award winners (2020–2029) =

The following is a list of George Foster Peabody Award winners during the decade of the 2020s.

== 2020 ==
| Recipient | Area of excellence |
Institutional honors
| ARRAY | Honored for "amplifying film and TV projects by people of color and women filmmakers", including Queen Sugar, When They See Us, 13th and Home Sweet Home |
Career achievement honors
| Sam Pollard | Honored for "chronicling the Black experience and illuminating complicated historical figures across film and television" over a more than 30-year career |
Journalistic Integrity Award honors
| Judy Woodruff | Honored for being a "trailblazer for women journalists and a role model committed to illuminating the truth at any cost" |
Special commendation
| Journalism crews | Honored for their work in 2020 amidst such events as the COVID-19 pandemic and the George Floyd protests |
Entertainment honorees
| HBO in association with BBC, Various Artists Limited and FALKNA | I May Destroy You |
| La Casa de Producción | La Llorona |
| BBC Studios Americas, Inc. and Amazon Studios | Small Axe |
| Apple/Doozer Productions in association with Warner Bros. Television and Universal Television | Ted Lasso |
| Showtime Presents Blumhouse Television, Mark 924 Entertainment, Under the Influence Productions | The Good Lord Bird |
| CBS Studios | The Late Show with Stephen Colbert |
| Studio Airlift and Real Film for Netflix | Unorthodox |
Children's & Youth honorees
| Apple/Scholastic Entertainment/Gaumont | Stillwater |
| Disney Television Animation | The Owl House |
Documentary honorees
| 76 Days LLC/MTV Documentary Films | 76 Days |
| CAAM, WETA, Flash Cuts, LLC., Tajima-Peña Productions, ITVS | Asian Americans |
| Alexander Nanau Production, Samsa Film, HBO Europe | Collective |
| A Higher Ground and Rusted Spoke Production in association with Little Punk/Just Films/Ford Foundation for Netflix | Crip Camp |
| A Reel Peak Films Production for Netflix | Immigration Nation |
| A Danish Documentary Production, in co-production with Ma.Ja.De, Hecat Studio Paris, Madam Films for National Geographic Documentary Films | The Cave |
| Concordia Studio, GB Feature, LLC and Amazon Studios | Time |
| Public Square Films, Ninety Thousand Words, Maylo Films, BBC Storyville and HBO Documentary Films | Welcome to Chechnya |
News honorees
| ABC News 20/20 and The Courier-Journal (Louisville, KY) | "Say Her Name: Breonna Taylor," a documentary that explored Taylor's life, her killing at the hands of police, and the protests that followed (Michael Strahan, Deborah Roberts, and Byron Pitts, correspondents) |
| Frontline | China Undercover, a documentary directed by Robin Barnwell detailing China's human rights abuses of Muslims, mostly Uyghurs, and its implications around the world |
| Frontline, Columbia Journalism Investigations, USA Today Network | "Whose Votes Counts," which examines the legal battles over absentee ballots during the 2020 Wisconsin elections and its ramifications for modern-day voting rights (produced by Tom Jennings, directed by June Cross, and narrated by Jelani Cobb) |
| KNXV-TV/Phoenix, AZ | "Full Disclosure," a documentary that detailed the "Brady list" system that tracks Arizona cops' history of lying and committing crimes, and how it is broken in terms of transparency and accountability (Dave Biscobing, reporter/correspondent) |
| Fuuse Films for ITV | Exposure, for Muslim in Trump's America |
| PBS NewsHour | Award for its coverage of the COVID-19 pandemic, in particular for the reports "Global Pandemic" (reported by Nick Schifrin, Jane Ferguson, Malcolm Brabant, Marcia Biggs, Bruce Harrison, Michael Baleke, and Max Duncan) and "Making Sense: The Victims of the COVID Economy" (reported by Paul Solman) |
| PBS NewsHour | "Desperate Journey," a report by Nadja Drost which covers migrants and refugees traveling the Darién Gap along the Colombia-Panama border |
| Vice News | Vice on Showtime, for "Losing Ground," a report by Alzo Slade which examines heir properties and its effects on African-American land owners |
Podcast & Radio honorees
| The Atlantic | Floodlines |
| Nashville Public Radio | Season two of The Promise (reported by Meribah Knight), which explores Nashville's fight against desegregation in terms of inequalities between Black and white schools |
| The Washington Post | Post Reports for "The Life of George Floyd," which chronicles Floyd's life, his family, and how systemic racism played a role in his death (Martine Powers, Ted Muldoon, Arelis Hernández, Toluse Olorunnipa, Robert Samuels, reporters/correspondents) |
Public Service honorees
| Chemical Soup, Lawrence Bender Productions, Netflix | Cops and Robbers, a live-action/animated short film created in response to the murder of Ahmaud Arbery and police brutality in general |
| KING-TV/Seattle, WA | Facing Race, a series that tackles issues of racism, racial inequality and racial privilege and its effects on residents of Seattle and its surrounding communities |

== 2021 ==
| Recipient | Area of excellence |
Career achievement honors
| Dan Rather | Award for Rather's six-decade career as a journalist, "a textbook example not just of what quality reporting looks like, but how journalists serve democracy well" |
Journalistic Integrity Award honors
| TV Rain (Dozhd) | Award for "Russia's last independent television channel" |
Special commendation
| Journalists and filmmakers in dangerous locales | Commendation for "courageous storytellers" who have risked their lives or died "in their line of duty to bring the truth to the world" |
Institutional honors
| Fresh Air | Award for "being recognized for its rich conversation for over 35 years, becoming the indispensable place for listeners to engage with many of the most beloved artists who have shaped society over the last century" |
Entertainment honorees
| Netflix | Bo Burnham: Inside |
| Hulu, Danny Strong Productions, John Goldwyn Productions, The Littlefield Company, 20th Television | Dopesick |
| Universal Television, a division of Universal Studio Group, in association with Paulilu, First Thought Productions, Fremulon Productions, 3 Arts Entertainment | Hacks |
| FX Productions | Reservation Dogs |
| Sphere Media | Sort Of |
| Plan B, PASTEL, Big Indie with Amazon Studios | The Underground Railroad |
| Working Title Television, a part of Universal International Television, a division of Universal Studio Group | We Are Lady Parts |
| 20th Television | The Wonder Years |
Children's and Youth honoree
| Netflix | City of Ghosts |
Documentary honorees
| Frontline with CineDiaz, Motto Pictures and Concordia Studio | A Thousand Cuts |
| HBO Presents a Velvet Film Production | Exterminate All the Brutes |
| A One Story Up Production and Pilgrim Media Group for Netflix | High on the Hog: How African American Cuisine Transformed America |
| HBO Documentary Films Presents a Motto Pictures/Little Horse Crossing the River/Little Lantern Company Production | In the Same Breath |
| American Documentary: POV | Mayor |
| Shoes in the Bed Productions, ITVS, Black Public Media (BPM) | Mr. SOUL! |
| Drexler Films, Storyville Films | My Name Is Pauli Murray |
| All Ages Productions, Department of Motion Pictures, PBS, ITVS, Topic | Philly D.A. |
News honorees
| ABC News Nightline | "The Appointment," a report by Rachel Scott on a Texas woman's journey to seek an abortion outside the state and her case on the right to choose |
| Frontline, Channel 4 | Escaping Eritrea |
| KNTV/San Jose, CA | Award for two reports involving family housing insecurities in San Francisco: "The Moms of Magnolia Street" and "No Man's Land: Fighting for Fatherhood in a Broken System" |
| KNXV-TV/Phoenix, AZ | "Politically Charged," which investigates how the Phoenix Police Department and Maricopa County Attorney's Office made false accusations towards Black Lives Matter protesters in a bid to prosecute them |
| KUSA/Denver, CO | "PRONE," a two-year investigation into deaths caused by the police usage of the prone restraining technique |
| The New York Times | Day of Rage: How Trump Supporters Took the U.S. Capitol |
| The New York Times | "So They Know We Existed": Palestinians Film War in Gaza, which shows refugees filming the turmoil of their homeland during the Israeli–Palestinian conflict |
| PBS NewsHour | Award for Lisa Desjardins's live on-the-scene reporting of the 2021 United States Capitol attack |
| Vice News | Award for the Transnational series (reported by Gazal Dhaliwal, Alyza Enriquez, Freddy McConnell, Eva Reign, Rana Thamrin, Sarah Burke, Hendrik Hinzel, Trey Strange, Daniel Ming, and Daisy Wardell), which showcases transgender communities around the world |
Podcast & Radio honorees
| NBC News Audio | Southlake, a podcast reported by Mike Hixenbaugh and Antonia Hylton which explores the debates of race and education in the eponymous Texas suburb and the growing rise of the controversial critical race theory |
| NPR | Throughline for "Afghanistan: The Center of the World," which examines the history of the country, its culture and its attempt to bring unity to the world prior to the Taliban |
| Rumble Strip | "Finn and the Bell," which explores the life of Finn Rooney, his suicide and how it impacted the small Vermont community that he lived in |
Arts honoree
| A Vulcan Productions Inc. Production, in association with Concordia Studio, Play/Action Pictures, LarryBilly Productions, Produced by Mass Distraction Media and RadicalMedia | Summer of Soul (...Or, When the Revolution Could Not Be Televised) |

== 2022 ==
| Recipient | Area of excellence |
Institutional honor
| Today | Award for 70 years of being "a morning staple for millions of Americans and a consistent cultural touchstone for deeply moving human stories, groundbreaking news and daily joy" |
Visionary Award honor
| Shari Frilot | Award for 20 years of having "been a curator and a programmer of emerging media, film and art through the Sundance Institute and external programming platforms" |
Trailblazer Award honor
| Issa Rae | Award for the creator of Insecure representing "a generation of storytellers who used the Internet to cultivate their craft in service of community" |
Career Achievement Award honor
| Lily Tomlin | Award for being "a groundbreaking force for women in comedy, as well as LGBTQ+ representation, as well as older women in television, all while being just plain smart and funny" |
Arts honoree
| National Geographic Documentary Films presents A Sandbox Films Production/An Intuitive Pictures & Cottage M Production | Fire of Love |
Entertainment honorees
| Delicious Non-Sequitur Productions in association with Warner Bros. Television and 20th Television, a part of Disney Television Studios | Abbott Elementary |
| Lucasfilm | Andor |
| FX Productions | Atlanta (the show's second win, a rare feat for a Peabody Award winner) |
| Merman/ABC Signature in association with Apple | Bad Sisters |
| High Bridge, Crystal Diner, Gran Via Productions and Sony Pictures Television | Better Call Saul (the show's second win, a rare feat for a Peabody Award winner) |
| HBO in association with Broadway Video, Antigravico and Más Mejor | Los Espookys |
| A24 for Netflix | Mo |
| Media Res/Blue Marble Pictures in association with Apple | Pachinko |
| Fifth Season/Red Hour Productions in association with Apple | Severance |
| HBO in association with House of Opus 20 and IPC | We're Here |
Documentary honorees
| Impact Partners Presents a Malka Films and Maidstone Company, Inc. Production in Association with Good Gravy Films and Just Films/Ford Foundation (aired on Hulu) | Aftershock |
| Saaren Films Inc., Six Island Productions Inc., Musa Dagh Productions | Batata |
| ITVS, Fork Films, Engel Entertainment (Airing on PBS's Independent Lens) | Missing in Brooks County |
| Black Ticket Films (Airing on PBS's Independent Lens) | Writing with Fire |
| Top Hat Productions/Hayloft Productions (aired on BBC Select) | Mariupol: The People's Story, a documentary about the Siege of Mariupol directed by Robin Barnwell |
| SO'B Productions (aired on Peacock) | The Rebellious Life of Mrs. Rosa Parks, directed by Johanna Hamilton and Yoruba Richen |
| National Geographic Documentary Films Presents A Documist and Associaçāo Jupaú Film in association with Time Studios, XTR, Doc Society Climate Story Fund/A Production of Protozoa Pictures, Passion Pictures, Real Lava | The Territory |
| Showtime Documentary Films Presents, A Boardwalk Films Production, in Association with WKB Industries | We Need to Talk About Cosby |
News honorees
| CNN | Award for Shimon Prokupecz's reporting on how police inaction contributed to the Robb Elementary School shooting in Uvalde, TX |
| PBS NewsHour | Award for Guns in America, which included on-the-ground updates from mass shootings in Buffalo and Uvalde, as well as impact stories from survivors and the implications for change on gun control (William Brangham, Amna Nawaz, Paul Solman, and Cat Wise, correspondents) |
| KARE/Minneapolis, MN | "The Gap: Failure to Treat, Failure to Protect," a six-part report from a year-long investigation that probes a mass shooting in a medical clinic, but broadens out into how the mentally ill can obtain guns, commit other crimes, and not be mandated into receiving treatment |
| AJ+ | "One Day in Hebron," which follows AJ+ presenter Dena Takruri as she returns to her hometown of Hebron in Palestine and comes to grips with the reality of the destruction caused by Israeli forces |
| Frontline with the Associated Press | Michael Flynn's Holy War, a documentary directed by Richard Rowley profiling Flynn's rise from an elite soldier overseas to a leader of a Christianity-rooted far-right movement in America |
| Frontline with Channel 4 | Ukraine: Life Under Russia's Attack, directed by Mani Benchelah and Patrick Tombola, which follows the lives of the Ukrainian people during the Russian invasion of Kharkiv and their struggles for survival, hope and rescue |
| Vice News | No Justice for Women in the Taliban's Afghanistan, which explores the decline of the rights of women in the country under the extremist group's control, with reporting by Isobel Yeung |
Podcast/radio honorees
| Spotify and Gimlet Media | Season two of Stolen, titled Surviving St. Michael's, which explores journalist Connie Walker's investigation into Canada's "Indian residential school system", and how her own father was abused by his priest while a system resident |
| On the Media/New York Public Radio | The Divided Dial, Katie Thornton's five-part look into the rise of Salem Media Group and the Christian radio network's influence on talk radio, politics, conservatism, and "the uneasy conflict over truth in American civic life" |
| This American Life | "The Pink House at the Center of the World," by Maisie Crow and Zoe Chace, which explores the Jackson Women's Health Clinic's fight for survival in Mississippi following the overturning of Roe v. Wade and the future of abortion in America |
Immersive and Interactive honorees
| Natalie Wynn | ContraPoints |
| Deck Nine and Square Enix | Life Is Strange: True Colors |
| Fable Studio, Third Rail Projects, Sound+Design, Story Studio & Experiences | Lucy and the Wolves in the Walls |
| The New Yorker | "Reeducated," a VR documentary which involves the lives of Uyghurs in Chinese prisons and the atrocities that they have suffered through |
| Media.Monks, Reporters Without Borders, Berlin DDB | The Uncensored Library |
Public service honoree
| Frontline | The Power of Big Oil |

== 2023 ==
| Recipient | Area of excellence |
Career Achievement Award honor
| Mel Brooks | Award for being a pioneer of spoof comedy and using his body of work as "a form of resistance" |
Trailblazer Award honor
| Quinta Brunson | Award for the creator of Abbott Elementary for not only "reflecting Peabody's mission of stories that matter", but also "opening the door for the next generation of Black leaders in television" |
Institutional honor
| Star Trek | Award for the franchise's "enduring dedication to storytelling that projects the best of humanity into the distant future" and "helping to invent a model of fandom that has since taken over the world" since its 1966 debut |
Global Impact Award honor
| WITNESS | Award for using the power of video to keep "protecting human rights around the world" since its founding in 1993 |
Arts honorees
| Black Public Media and World Channel | Can You Bring It: Bill T. Jones and D-Man in the Waters, directed by Rosalynde LeBlanc and Tom Hurwitz and shown on AfroPoP: The Ultimate Cultural Exchange |
| Amazon MGM Studios, Imagine Documentaries | Judy Blume Forever |
Children's/Youth honoree
| Ludo Studio, Australian Broadcasting Corporation, BBC Studios, Disney+ | Bluey |
Documentary honorees
| Frontline, The Associated Press | 20 Days in Mariupol |
| HBO Documentary Films presents ALL THAT BREATHES in association with Submarine Deluxe and Sideshow; a Kiterabbit Films and Rise Films production in collaboration with HHMI Tangled Bank Studios | All That Breathes |
| HBO Documentary Films presents a Participant and Neon presentation | All the Beauty and the Bloodshed |
| Southern Films/Ventureland/National Geographic Documentary Films | Bobi Wine: The People's President |
| BRITDOC Films, American Documentary|POV (Airing on PBS's POV) | While We Watched |
| HBO Documentary Films | The Stroll |
Entertainment honorees
| FX Productions | The Bear |
| Amazon MGM Studios, Annapurna Television | Dead Ringers |
| Showtime presents a Fremantle and Showtime Studios Production | Fellow Travelers |
| Amazon MGM Studios, Picrow, The District, Piece of Work Entertainment | Jury Duty |
| HBO in association with Sony Pictures Television Studios, PlayStation Productions, Word Games, The Mighty Mint and Naughty Dog | The Last of Us |
| HBO in association with Peyance Productions and Avalon Television | Last Week Tonight with John Oliver for its segment about the Gaza war |
| HBO Films presents a Seaview and 2 Sq Ft production in association with Burn These Words, In the Cut Productions, Fit Via Vi, Cinereach, Tanbark Pictures | Reality |
| FX Productions | Reservation Dogs (the show's second win, a rare feat for a Peabody winner) |
| HBO in association with Duplass Brothers Productions and The Mighty Mint | Somebody Somewhere |
Interactive and Immersive honorees
| Gen Z Historian, Urbanist Live | The Hidden History of Racism in New York City on Instagram |
| Obsidian Entertainment | Pentiment |
| OFK | We Are OFK |
| NowHere Media | You Destroy. We Create|The War on Ukraine's culture |
News honorees
| KXAS-TV/Fort Worth, TX | "Against All Enemies," a series of reports about the Constitutional Sheriffs and Peace Officers Association, their ties to the Oath Keepers, and how their ideas have slowly crept into the training regiments of Texas sheriffs |
| Frontline | Clarence and Ginni Thomas: Politics, Power and the Supreme Court, a report by Michael Kirk which chronicles the rise of the controversial Supreme Court justice, his marriage to his wife, their actions in the realm of right-wing politics and the dangerous connotations surrounding them |
| WTVF/Nashville, TN | "Hate Come to Main Street," a report by Phil Williams which profiles Republican mayoral candidate Gabrielle Hanson's campaign of Christian nationalism and anti-LGBTQ rights, and "hypocrisy and deceit" surrounding it ranging from carpetbagging to lying to police |
| AJ+ | "It's Bisan from Gaza and I'm Still Alive," which chronicles Palestinian journalist Bisan Owda's reporting from the Gaza Strip during the Israel-Gaza war, her family's escape to safety and her will to survive while bringing the world updates from the frontlines |
| PBS NewsHour | "War in the Holy Land," an hour-long report by Leila Molana-Allen which chronicles both sides of the Israel-Hamas war through interviews |
Public Service honorees
| Frontline | America and the Taliban, a three-part documentary by Marcela Gaviria and Martin Smith which chronicles the 20-year war in Afghanistan and its examination of the failures and missteps which led to how the Taliban took over the country |
| USA Today and The Tennessean | "The Post Roe Baby Boom: Inside Mississippi's Maternal Health Crisis," an episode of States of America, with reporting by Danielle Dreilinger, which chronicles the straining of the state's maternal healthcare system after the overturning of Roe v. Wade amidst high birth rates in the Mississippi Delta |
Podcast/Radio honorees
| GBH News and PRX | The Big Dig, a nine-part podcast by Ian Coss that explores the titular project's development ranging from its groundbreaking in 1991 to its eventual completion in 2007 and how it made Boston livable despite its delays and shortcomings |
| The Washington Post | The Empty Grave of Comrade Bishop, from Martine Powers, Ted Muldoon, and Rennie Svirnovskiy, which explores the search for the remains of executed Grenadian prime minister Maurice Bishop and the people who were affected by his death |
| The Washington Post | Post Reports for "Surviving to graduation," a three part series by Hannah Natanson, Sabby Robinson and Moriah Balingit which investigates two separate shootings at Huguenot High School in Richmond, Virginia and the efforts by students for ways to cope during those tumultuous times |
| Serial Productions and The New York Times | The Retrievals |
| Invisible Institute and USG Audio | You Didn't See Nothin, a podcast hosted by Yohance Lacour which sees him explore the 1997 hate crime of the death of Leonard Clark by white teenagers in Chicago through the eyes of the modern day |

== 2024 ==
| Recipient | Area of excellence |
Career Achievement honor
| Andrea Mitchell | Award for the NBC News Chief Washington and Chief Foreign Affairs Correspondent's five decades of "covering some of the biggest stories of our times," ranging from eight White House administrations to landmark events around the globe |
Institutional honor
| Saturday Night Live | Award for the show's 50 years of being "at the forefront of topical comedy" |
Arts honoree
| National Geographic, Little Monster Films | Photographer |
Children's/youth honoree
| Big Beach, Participant, EveryWhere Studios LLC, and Disney Branded Television | Out of My Mind |
Documentary honorees
| A Banger Films and National Film Board of Canada production | Any Other Way: The Jackie Shane Story |
| Hanashi Films, Cineric Creative and Star Sands | Black Box Diaries |
| Apple Original Films presents an Eyan Foundation presentation in association with Extracurricular and Excellent Cadaver | Bread and Roses |
| A Netflix Documentary/An Object & Animal and Epoch Films Production/A Park Pictures and XTR Production/In Association with OPC, World of HA, Simpson Street and Two One Five | Daughters |
| A Netflix Documentary/An SK Global Entertainment Production/An OBB Pictures Production/An Avocados and Coconuts Production/In Association with MakeMake Entertainment | Mountain Queen: The Summits of Lhakpa Sherpa |
| HBO Documentary Films presents a Little Horse Crossing the River and Hard Working Movies Production in association with NiKa Media and Secret Sauce Media | Night Is Not Eternal |
| Vitamin Sea Productions and Vision Maker Media (Aired on PBS's Independent Lens) | One with the Whale (directed by Jim Wickens and Peter Chelkowski) |
| A Galdanova Film Production in association with Sundance Institute Documentary Film Program, International Documentary Association, InMaat Productions, Doc Society and Sopka Films | Queendom |
| HBO Documentary Films presents in association with Concord Originals, PolyGram Entertainment, Warner Music Entertainment; A Laylow Pictures production; A White Horse Pictures production | Stax: Soulsville U.S.A. |
| Medieoperatørene and VGTB for Netflix | The Remarkable Life of Ibelin |
| HBO Documentary Films presents an Amos Pictures Production | The Truth vs. Alex Jones |
| A Netflix Documentary/A Wayfarer Studios Film/A Delirio Films Production/A Gloria Sanchez Production | Will & Harper |
Entertainment honorees
| A Netflix Series/A Clerkenwell Films Production | Baby Reindeer |
| HBO in association with Irony Point, Fruit Tree, 3 Arts Entertainment and Space Prince Inc. | Fantasmas |
| A Co-Production of ITV Studios, Little Gem and Masterpiece for ITV | Mr Bates vs The Post Office |
| Showtime and Endemol Shine North America in association with Entertainment 360 and Filmrights for Netflix | Ripley |
| FX Productions | Say Nothing |
| FX Productions | Shōgun |
| Working Title Television, which is a part of Universal International Studios, a division of Universal Studio Group | We Are Lady Parts (the show's second win, a rare feat for a Peabody winner) |
Interactive & Immersive honorees
| Sunset Visitor and Fellow Traveller Games | 1000xResist |
| The New York Times | Inside the Deadly Maui Inferno, Hour by Hour, which explores the causes of the 2023 Hawaii wildfires in Maui and the aftereffects through video and interviews |
| Al Jazeera Digital | "One Day in Gaza|Close Up", a video that showcases the Gaza war through the eyes of Palestinian citizens trying to survive |
| Dr. Joel Bervell | "What Does Racial Bias in Medicine Look Like?" |
News honorees
| WTVF/Nashville, TN | "Confronting Hate", a report by Phil Williams that investigates the rise of right-wing extremism all throughout Tennessee, ranging from neo-Nazis to white Christian nationalism, while facing harassment from said groups online |
| KNXV-TV/Phoenix, AZ | "Policing Phoenix", a 32-part series reported by Dave Biscobing and Melissa Blasius that revolves around a United States Department of Justice report on the Phoenix Police Department's treatment of Black Lives Matter protestors for over three years |
| Vice News | Surviving Nova, produced by Gilad Thaler, Maya Rostowska, and Oren Rosenfeld, which explores the 2023 Nova music festival massacre in Israel through footage and testimonies from the people who survived the onslaught |
| Al Jazeera English | Fault Lines for "The Night Won't End", directed by Kavitha Chekuru, which worked in partnership with Airwars, Forensic Architecture, and Earshot to explore the Israeli forces's attacks on Palestinian citizens using weapons supplied by the United States, the lack of "safe zones" in Gaza and how America needs to be held accountable for their actions |
Public Service honoree
| Reel South, BellaFran Productions, PBS North Carolina, South Carolina Educational Television, Louisiana Public Broadcasting | The Only Doctor, directed by Matthew Hashiguchi, which explores Dr. Karen Kinsell running Clay County, Georgia's only medical clinic, her commitment to treat patients who are not insured, and the critique of the healthcare system threatening its existence |
Radio/podcast honorees
| WNYC Studios and History Channel | Blindspot for The Plague in the Shadows, which explores the early years of the AIDS epidemic, the places where HIV first took shape in and the people who refused to stay out of sight in its wake |
| The New Yorker | In the Dark for The Killings in Haditha, which explores the 2005 Haditha killings, the responses of military officials who were involved, and the damaging impact caused by the U.S. wars on terror |
| Trevor Aaronson, Western Sound and Audible | Pulse: The Untold Story, an audiobook by Aaronson which explores the 2016 Pulse nightclub shooting, how it is revealed to be a crime caused by Omar Mateen's opposition to U.S. military actions in Iraq and Syria, and how the FBI's narrative both shaped perception to the public and obscured its failures after the investigation |
| This American Life | "Yousef, Youmna, Banias, and Majd: Four Lives in Gaza", a report by Chana Joffe-Walt which delves into her conversations with the titular subjects and the four people's vulnerability and resiliency during the Gaza war |

== 2025 ==
| Recipient | Area of excellence |
Career Achievement honor
| Amy Poehler | Award for the star of Good Hang with Amy Poehler, Parks and Recreation, and Saturday Night Live and founder of Paper Kite Productions for an "unerring wit rooted in a deep sense of humanity and her willingness to use old and new media to make us feel a sense of connection" |
Trailblazer honor
| Sterlin Harjo | Award for the creator of The Lowdown and Reservation Dogs for "expanding the possibilities of television storytelling while centering Indigenous voices with originality, humanity, and purpose" |
Institutional honor
| PBS Kids | Award for three decades of "the finest in wholesome, educational, and entertaining children's television accessible to youngsters of all economic and ethnic backgrounds and living in every corner of America", including Daniel Tiger's Neighborhood, Carl the Collector, Wild Kratts, and Alma's Way |
Industry Icon honor
| James L. Brooks | Awards for the founder of Gracie Films for "both his visionary works that pulled us into what was next and his lasting drive to mentor new talent" |
News honorees
| Al Jazeera English | Fault Lines for two segments related to the humanitarian crisis during the Gaza war: "Kids Under Fire" and "The Disappearance of Dr. Abu Safiya" |
| PBS News Hour | Award for "Immigration Crackdown," which details President Donald Trump's plans of deportation for immigrants, the rising fear and anxiety within the immigrant community and the complex history of immigration in the United States |
| ABC News and KABC-TV/Los Angeles, CA | Award for their coverage of the January 2025 Southern California wildfires |
| KMBC-TV/Kansas City, MO | Award for Restrained, which details the pattern of injuries and deaths caused by severe mistreatment of prisoners in Kansas City who are bound to immobilizing devices such as restraining chairs |
| Frontline and ProPublica | The Rise and Fall of Terrorgram, a report by A.C. Thompson and James Bandler which details the network's ties to mass shootings in San Diego, Slovakia and New Zealand, how it recruited white supremacists through Telegram and the ramifications of gun violence and political online extremism in the digital age |
Podcast and radio honorees
| Wonder Media Network and IHeartMedia | Divine Intervention, a podcast hosted by Brendan Patrick Hughes which details a Catholic anti-war movement made up of nuns and priests in 1971 Boston opposing the Vietnam War and their actions surrounding the movement including confrontations with the FBI |
| The Economist | Scam Inc, a podcast hosted by Sue-Lin Wong which details, through interviews, pig butchering scams and the cost of such a scam in the world of finance |
| Eureka Street Productions | When We All Get to Heaven, which details the Metropolitan Community Church of San Francisco and the complex relationship between the LGBT community and faith in general during the AIDS crisis via audio cassettes |
Documentary honorees
| HBO Documentary Films; Hit the Ground Running | The Alabama Solution |
| Apple/Tripod Media/Amplify Pictures/Treat Media/Something Fierce Productions | Come See Me in the Good Light |
| Made in Copenhagen in co-production with PINK | Mr Nobody Against Putin |
| Antipode Films | No Other Land |
| HBO Documentary Films presents an Elara & First Love Films Production | Pee-wee as Himself |
| Rêves d'Eau Productions | Put Your Soul on Your Hand and Walk |
| ESPN | Southpaw – The Life and Legacy of Jim Abbott |
| HBO Documentary Films presents a Tony Tina Production | Thoughts & Prayers |
Arts honorees
| Audible, Higher Ground, Western Sound and Talkhouse | Fela Kuti: Fear No Man |
| MRC, Network Entertainment, Two One Five Entertainment Inc., RadicalMedia, StarDust Films LLC, ID8 Multimedia Inc. and Sony Music Entertainment | Sly Lives! (aka The Burden of Black Genius) |
Entertainment honorees
| Warp Films, Matriarch Productions and Plan B for Netflix | Adolescence |
| Lucasfilm | Andor (the show's second win, a rare feat for a Peabody winner) |
| Green Street Pictures, Adult Swim, Bandera Entertainment and Williams Street | Common Side Effects |
| 20th Television | Dying for Sex |
| A Netflix Series | Forever |
| Accent Aigu Entertainment in association with Bell Media's Crave | Heated Rivalry |
| 20th Television in association with Kimmelot | Jimmy Kimmel Live! |
| Sky Studios and Lorenzo Mieli for The Apartment, a Fremantle group company, in co-production with Pathé, in association with Small Forward Productions, in collaboration with Fremantle, Cinecittà S.p.A., Sky and MUBI | Mussolini: Son of the Century |
| HBO Max in association with John Wells Productions, R. Scott Gemmill Productions and Warner Bros. Television | The Pitt |
| Sony Pictures Television in association with Apple | Pluribus |
| HBO in association with Blow Out Productions | The Rehearsal |
Children's/Youth honor
| Flying Bark Productions, Disney Television Animation, Disney Branded Television | Marvel's Moon Girl and Devil Dinosaur |
Interactive and Immersive honorees
| The New Yorker | Cleared by Fire, an interactive documentary that details the Haditha massacre through the eyes of survivor Khalid Jamal, who lost his parents during the attack |
| The Atlanta Journal-Constitution | ICE Sweeps Georgia, a social video series that details raids in Georgia by United States Immigration and Customs Enforcement forces through vertical video and body cam footage and the negative impact caused by the situation |
| Al Jazeera English | Investigating War Crimes in Gaza, which details the massacre of Palestinian civilians through video of Israeli armed forces and the negative impact surrounding it |
| Compulsion Games | South of Midnight |
