= Jeffrey Brown (journalist) =

American journalist (born 1956)

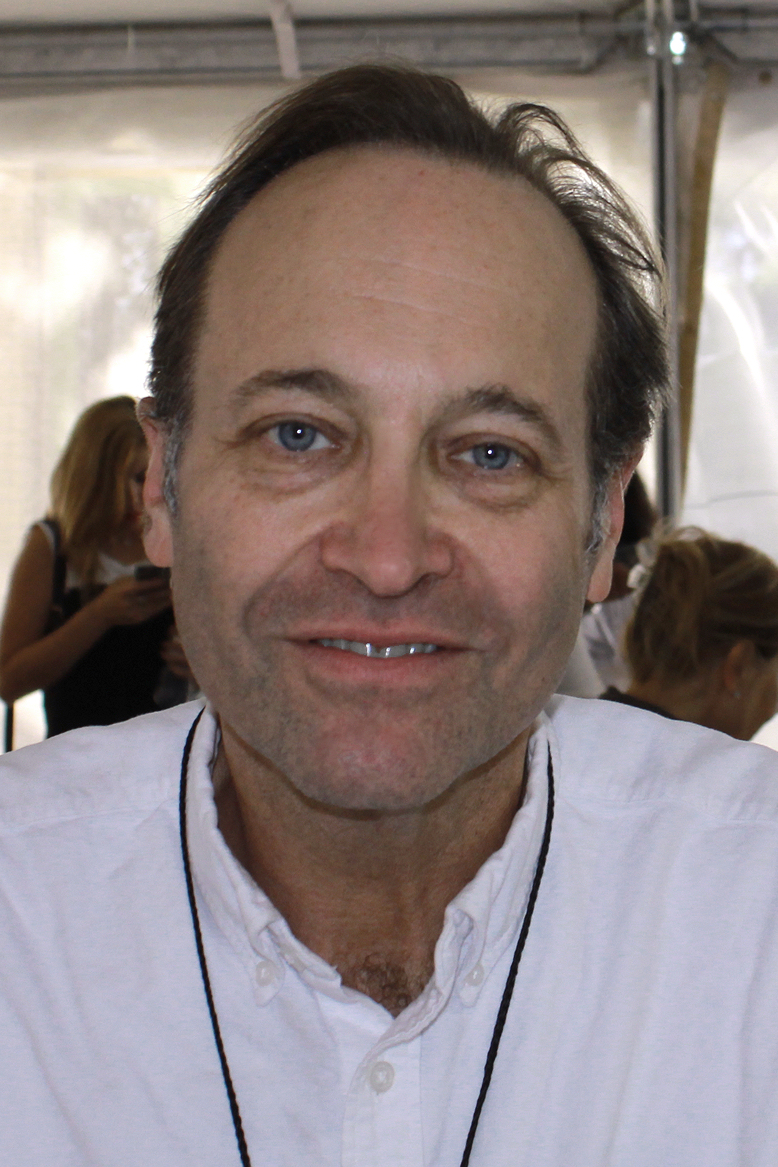
- Brown at the 2015 Texas Book Festival
- Born: 1956 (age 69–70)
- Education: UC Berkeley (BA); Columbia University (MS)
- Occupation: Journalist
- Spouse: Paula Crawford
- Children: 2
- Parent(s): Morton Brown; Mirriam "Micki" Brown (née Decter)

Jeffrey Brown (born 1956) is an American journalist, who is a senior correspondent for the PBS NewsHour. His reports focus on arts and literature, and he has interviewed numerous writers, poets, and musicians. Brown has worked most of his professional career at PBS and has written a poetry collection called The News.

== Early life and education ==
Brown was born in 1956 to Morton Brown and Mirriam "Micki" Brown (née Decter). He has four siblings, and grew up in Belmont, Massachusetts. He graduated from high school in 1974.

Brown studied Classics at the University of California, Berkeley, earning a bachelor's degree. He planned to pursue a PhD subsequently in order to become an academic, but finally decided he wanted to be a law journalist. Brown did a joint program at Berkeley Law and the Columbia Journalism School. He first studied law for two years and then studied journalism for one year. Brown received a master's degree in journalism, but did not finish law school. In 2010, Brown received an honorary degree (D.H.L.) from Wesley College after giving a commencement speech there.

== Career ==
While studying at Columbia, Brown met television executive Fred W. Friendly, who worked as a professor at the university. After he graduated, Brown became Friendly's teaching assistant and a producer for the Columbia University Seminars on Media & Society, a television production company directed by Friendly. For a few years, Brown helped produce and write the seminars that were aired on public television about, among other things, ethics, law, foreign policy, and the Constitution.

Thereafter, in 1988, Brown joined the PBS NewsHour, which was at that time called The MacNeil/Lehrer NewsHour. He was hired as an off-camera economics reporter, and was initially based in New York City, but moved to Washington, D.C. eight years later. At first, Brown worked as a reporter and a producer, before being promoted to the position of senior producer for national affairs. He became an on-camera correspondent in 1998, covering both general events and arts.

Brown was named the NewsHour's arts correspondent, when that position was created, in March 2002. Brown was promoted to senior correspondent three years later. In December 2008, the NewsHour launched a blog called "Art Beat", covering arts and culture, which is written by Brown and other NewsHour reporters.

Brown became part of the anchor team, when The NewsHour with Jim Lehrer was renamed PBS NewsHour in December 2009; Jim Lehrer was joined every broadcast by either Judy Woodruff, Gwen Ifill, or Brown. After Lehrer stepped down in June 2012, the program was hosted by Woodruff, Ifill, Brown, Ray Suarez, and Margaret Warner on a rotating basis. That situation ended in September 2013, when Gwen Ifill and Judy Woodruff became the sole anchors. Simultaneously, Brown was named "chief correspondent for arts, culture, and society".

Between September 2012 and May 2014, Brown presented the series "Where Poetry Lives" on the NewsHour together with Poet Laureate Natasha Trethewey. They travelled through the US to report on societal issues through the lens of poetry. In 2014, Brown started presenting the NewsHour series "Culture at Risk" about threatened heritage in the United States and abroad. For that series, he has reported from numerous countries, including Myanmar, Peru, Mali, Nepal (after the April 2015 earthquake), Cuba, Italy, Spain, Tunisia, and South Africa. When the PBS NewsHour launched a monthly book club in collaboration with The New York Times called "Now Read This" in 2018, Brown became its host, interviewing the writers.

Besides covering arts, culture, and society, Brown has during his years as an arts correspondent for the NewsHour also occasionally reported on other subjects including science and politics. For example, he co-anchored coverage of President Obama's second inauguration, and has participated in election night coverage during the 2008, 2012, and 2016 presidential elections.

Brown has also released a poetry collection called The News, that contains 45 poems about reporting on television, things he encountered while reporting, and personal events in his life. It was published by Copper Canyon Press in May 2015, and has a foreword written by poet Robert Pinsky. Elizabeth Lund wrote the following about the collection in a review in The Washington Post: "[Brown] knows how to tell a story, and The News does a wonderful job of balancing the language of journalism and the power of poetry."

== Accolades ==
Brown has won a number of awards, including a News & Documentary Emmy Award, a Peabody Award, and multiple CINE Golden Eagle Awards. The Emmy was awarded in the category "Outstanding Background/Analysis of a Single Current Story - (Segments)" to a segment about an antitrust case against Microsoft in 1999 and the Peabody Award to a segment about the unemployment rate in 2003. Brown produced both segments.

In 2002, Brown won a CINE Golden Eagle Award for his arts coverage on the NewsHour. In the following years, a number of segments, of which Brown he was the correspondent, won Golden Eagles including "Intelligent Design v. Evolution" (2005), "Doubt" (2005), "Blues Master: B.B. King" (2006), "Death is on Hold/Connecting with Kids" (2007), "Haitian Artists Create Poetry Amid Rubble" (2011), and "Musical Legend Herbie Hancock" (2011).

== Personal life ==
Brown is married to Paula Crawford, an artist, professor, and author. They met while they were both studying at UC Berkeley, and have two children. Brown lives in Arlington, Virginia.

== See also ==
- PBS NewsHour
