= Susan Dentzer =

American health policy analyst

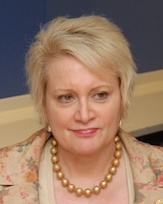
- Dentzer in 2012
- Born: Philadelphia, Pennsylvania, United States
- Education: Dartmouth College
- Spouse: Charles "Chuck" Alston
- Children: William, Samuel and Grace Alston
- Awards: Nieman Fellow, Harvard

Susan Dentzer an American healthcare and health policy analyst, commentator, and journalist. She is the president and chief executive officer of America's Physician Groups, the organization of more than 335 physician practices that provide patient-centered, coordinated, and integrated care for patients while being accountable for cost and quality. Until April 2022, she was a senior policy fellow at the Robert J. Margolis Center for Health Policy at Duke University, located in Washington, D.C. She was formerly president and chief executive officer of the Network for Excellence in Health Innovation (NEHI). Prior to NEHI, she served as the senior policy adviser for the Robert Wood Johnson Foundation. She was the editor-in-chief of the journal Health Affairs.

== Early life and education ==
Dentzer attended public schools in Arlington County, Virginia, with an interruption of several years when her family lived in South America. She graduated from Dartmouth College in 1977, becoming one of the first women to attend the university.

== Career ==
Denzter is an elected member of the National Academy of Medicine (formerly the Institute of Medicine) and the Council on Foreign Relations. She worked as a former health correspondent for the News Hour with Jim Lehrer and correspondent and columnist for U.S. News & World Report and a senior writer for Newsweek.

Denzter became a member of Harvard's Nieman Fellowship in 1987. From 1987 to 1997, Dentzer worked as a chief economics correspondent and economics columnist for U.S. News & World Report.

In 1993, she was the first alumna to be nominated to the Board of Trustees of Dartmouth College in an alumni election, and in 2001, she became the first alumna to chair the board of trustees. She served on the board from 1993 to 2004. She remains a trustee emerita at Dartmouth.

In 1998, Dentzer joined "The NewsHour" serving as its on-air health correspondent for ten years and leading the show's award-winning unit covering health care and health policy. In May 2008, Dentzer joined Health Affairs, a journal on American and global health policy. She worked with the journal until 2013.

Dentzer's 2015 PBS documentary Reinventing American Healthcare covered the Geisinger Health System.

== Memberships ==
- Member of the National Academy of Medicine (formerly the Institute of Medicine) and member of its Board on Population Health and Public Health Practice
- Member of the Council on Foreign Relations
- Fellow of the National Academy of Social Insurance
- Fellow of the Hastings Center
- Member of the board of directors of the International Rescue Committee
- Member of the board of directors of the American Board of Medical Specialties
- Member of the board of directors of the Public Health Institute
- Member of the RAND Health Board of Advisors
- Member of the March of Dimes national advisory board
