= Escaping Eritrea =

2021 English documentary

- Directed by: Evan Williams
- Music by: Nicholas A. Phillips
- Original language: English

Production
- Producer: Evan Williams
- Cinematography: Real footage
- Editors: Deb Holland; Bradley Manning
- Running time: 53 minutes
- Production companies: PBS; Channel 4

Original release
- Release: 4 May 2021

Escaping Eritrea is a 2021 English documentary episode produced and directed by Evan Williams. The co-producers are Daffodil Altan, Priyanka Boghani, Daniel Edge, Max Green, Erika Howard, Michelle Mizner and Evan Williams. The real footage was taken by Michael, who was also a refugee from Eritrea who moved to Europe. He put the camera in a jacket pocket with a hole and began filming what was going on around him.

The documentary based on the refugee crisis between 2015 and 2016 occurred across the Mediterranean where large groups coming across into Europe from Eritrea. It took five years for the investigations and some secretly documented footage inside a prison also included in the documentary. It made its television premier on 4 May 2021 on PBS through Frontline in United States and later telecast in Channel 4 in the United Kingdom.

== Cast ==
- Isias Afwerki - President of Eritrea (archive footage)
- Priyanka Boghani - Reporter
- Sarah Childress - Reporter
- Yemane Gebreab - Adviser to president of Eritrea (archive footage)
- Sheila B. Keetharuth - Former U.N. Special Rapporteur on Human Rights in Eritrea
- Sophie Okonedo - Narrator (voice)
- Mike Smith - Chair Commission of Inquiry on Human Rights in Eritrea (archive footage)
- Hanna Petros Solomon - Eritrean refugee and activist
- Evan Williams - Reporter
- Judy Woodruff
- Katie Worth - Reporter

== Accolades ==
2021 Peabody Award Winner
