= Geoff Bennett (journalist) =

American broadcast journalist (born 1980)

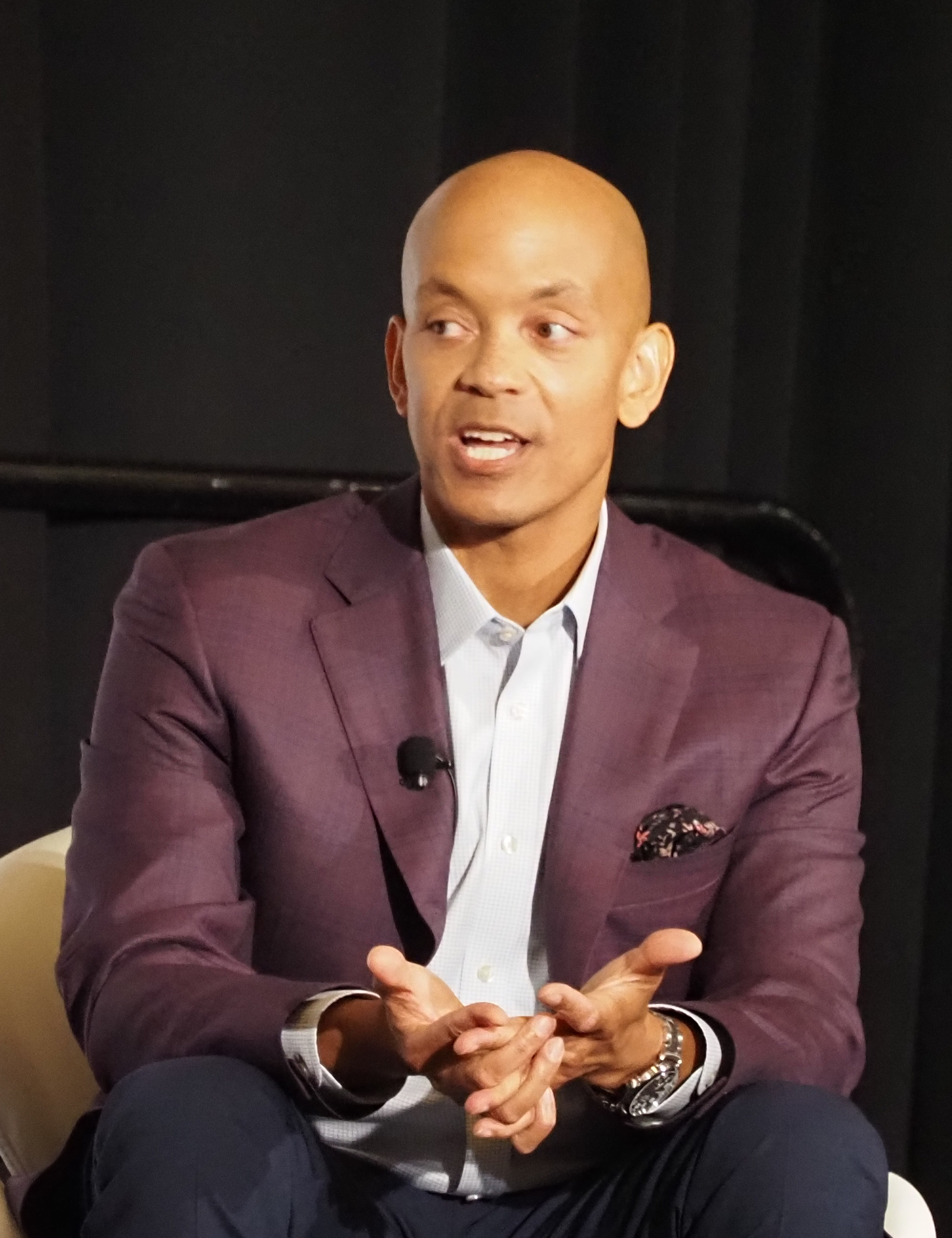
- Geoff Bennett in 2026
- Born: Geoffrey Robinson Bennett; April 25, 1980 (age 46)
- Education: Morehouse College (BA, English)
- Occupations: Broadcast journalist, editor, reporter, anchor
- Known for: PBS NewsHour, PBS News Weekend, NPR, NBC, MSNBC
- Spouse: Beth Bennett (m. 2010)
- Children: 1
- Relatives: Gary Bennett (brother)

Geoffrey Robinson Bennett (born April 25, 1980) is an American broadcast journalist and a co-anchor of the PBS NewsHour alongside Amna Nawaz. He has worked as an editor, reporter and news anchor on radio, cable and broadcast television, and online.

== Early life ==
Bennett grew up in Voorhees, New Jersey. His father, Gary Bennett Sr., was a school administrator. His mother, Lynnca, taught kindergarten. He has an older brother, Gary Bennett Jr.

== Career ==
Bennett graduated with honors from Morehouse College with a BA in English in 2002. During his senior year, he pursued an internship at ABC News where he was mentored by Carole Simpson, then the weekend anchor of ABC World News Tonight.

The internship led to his first job in journalism, an off-air production assistant at World News Tonight at ABC News in New York and then associate producer.

In 2007, he joined NPR in Los Angeles as a digital producer and editor for News & Notes, and was regularly heard on-air. He moved to Washington, D.C. in 2009 to be an editor at Weekend Edition.

Starting in 2013, Bennett reported on-camera from Washington, D.C., for NY1 News and other Time Warner Cable news channels. He was also a guest host of Washington Journal on C-SPAN.

He returned to NPR in 2017 as an on-air reporter based in Washington, D.C., covering Congress and the White House.

In November 2017, he became a White House correspondent for NBC and substitute anchor for MSNBC.

In November 2021, while continuing to contribute to NBC and MSNBC, Bennett started work as the chief Washington correspondent for the PBS NewsHour and the anchor of PBS News Weekend.

He and Amna Nawaz have been co-anchors of the PBS NewsHour since January 2023, when they replaced Judy Woodruff. The program's coverage of the Israel-Hamas war received a 2023 Peabody Award. In 2026, the program received a second Peabody Award for its coverage of U.S. immigration policy during the first year of Donald Trump's second term.

In March 2026, Bennett published his debut book, Black Out Loud: The Revolutionary History of Black Comedy from Vaudeville to '90s Sitcoms (HarperCollins), a bestselling history of Black comedy in America.

== Personal life ==
He is married to Carolyn Elizabeth "Beth" Bennett née Perry. They have one son, and live in the Washington, D.C. area.

In January 2023, Bennett established a scholarship for English and journalism majors at Morehouse College.

Media offices
Preceded by Judy Woodruff	PBS NewsHour anchor With: Amna Nawaz	Succeeded by Incumbent
