= John Yang (journalist) =

American news correspondent and commentator (born 1958)

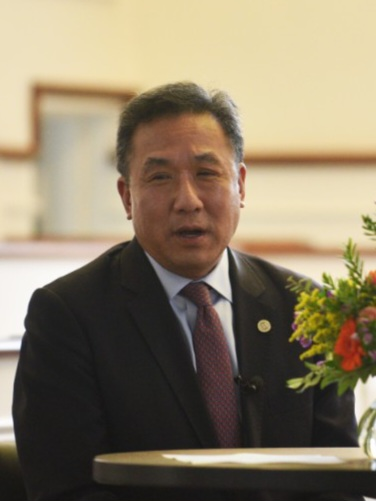
- Yang in 2024
- Born: John Eric Yang; February 10, 1958 (age 68); Chillicothe, Ohio, U.S.
- Education: Wesleyan University (BA)
- Years active: 1980–2026
- Employer: PBS
- Known for: Journalism
- Height: 5 ft 8 in (173 cm)

John Eric Yang (born February 10, 1958) is an American news correspondent and commentator who anchored PBS News Weekend from December 31, 2022, to January 11, 2026. He was previously a special correspondent for the PBS NewsHour and a correspondent for NBC News and ABC News.

== Early life ==
Yang was born in Chillicothe, Ohio, on February 10, 1958. He attended high school at Western Reserve Academy, a private, coeducational boarding school in Hudson, Ohio, where he graduated in 1975. He attended Wesleyan University, where he graduated cum laude in 1980. He developed an interest in political journalism, and began writing about American politics and the United States Congress.

== Career ==
=== Early, print journalism ===
After college, Yang got a job as a reporter with The Boston Globe, where he worked from 1980 to 1981. He moved on to Time, where he worked as a correspondent from 1981 to 1986. He was a reporter for The Wall Street Journal from 1986 to 1990.

In 1990, Yang became a reporter and editor at The Washington Post, where he worked for nearly ten years. As a reporter he covered domestic politics, including Congress and the White House. As an editor he directed coverage of economic policy in the paper's business section and also directed political features in the Style section.

=== Television ===
In November 1999, Yang left The Post when he was offered a job as a Washington, D.C.–based correspondent at ABC News. In 2000, he became well known for covering the George W. Bush presidential campaign during Republican Party primaries. After the primaries and until election, Yang covered the Al Gore campaign, and he continued to cover the campaign during the Florida election recount. Following the September 11 attacks, Yang reported live from the Pentagon and worked as part of the ABC News team that was awarded a Peabody Award and Alfred I. duPont-Columbia University Award for its 9/11 coverage.

From 2002 to 2004, Yang was transferred to Jerusalem, working as ABC's Middle East correspondent. He covered every major development of the Israeli-Palestinian conflict, including suicide bombings and Israeli military operations in Palestinian territories. In April 2005, Yang covered the death of Pope John Paul II, working with the ABC News team that also won an Alfred I. duPont-Columbia University Award for its coverage of the event.

In January 2007, Yang joined NBC News as a correspondent. In November 2007, he was named NBC News White House correspondent. He covered the 2008 presidential race for NBC Nightly News with Brian Williams.

In 2009, Yang was transferred from NBC News' Washington bureau to its Chicago bureau. "NBC is moving me from the city of big egos to the city of broad shoulders," Yang told colleagues in a note.

In February 2016, Yang began working as a correspondent for the PBS NewsHour. He started serving as the anchor for PBS News Weekend on December 31, 2022. On January 9, 2026, Yang announced he would be departing PBS News at the end of the month following the cancellation of PBS News Weekend due to federal budget cuts. The final broadcast aired on January 11, 2026.

== Personal life ==
Yang is gay. In 2013, while working for NBC News' Chicago bureau, he bought a three-bedroom condominium in the Lake View neighborhood.
