= Gary Bennett (educator) =

American scholar

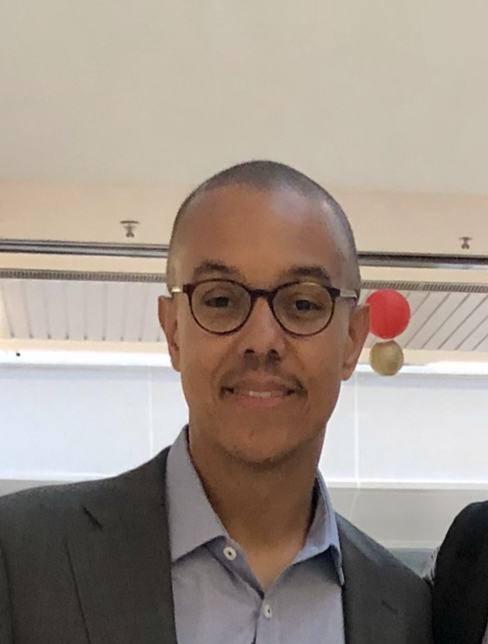

Dean of Trinity College of Arts and Sciences
- Incumbent
- Assumed office February 1, 2023
- Preceded by: Valerie Sheares Ashby

Personal details
- Relatives: Geoff Bennett (brother)
- Education: Morehouse College (BA); Duke University (MA, Ph.D)

Gary G. Bennett Jr. is the Bishop-MacDermott Family Professor of Psychology & Neuroscience, Global Health and Medicine at Duke University. In November 2022, he was appointed Dean of Trinity College of Arts and Sciences, effective February 2023.

== Education and career ==
Bennett earned a Ph.D and MA in clinical health psychology at Duke University and a bachelor's degree from Morehouse College.

In July 2018, Bennett was appointed Vice Provost of Undergraduate Education at Duke University. He is the founding director of the Duke Global Digital Health Science Center. He co-founded Crimson Health Solutions, acquired by Health Dialog in 2007. In 2014, he co-founded Scale Down, a digital obesity treatment startup acquired by Anthem in 2017. He also founded Coeus Health, a provider of health APIs.

He is the former President of the Society of Behavioral Medicine and a fellow of the Association for Psychological Science.

Bennett developed the interactive obesity treatment approach (iOTA); and his research program designs, tests, and disseminates digital obesity treatments.

== Recognition ==
Bennett is a fellow of the Association for Psychological Science and is an elected member of the Academy of Behavioral Medicine Research and Behavioral Medicine Research Council.
