= Stephanie Sy =

American journalist

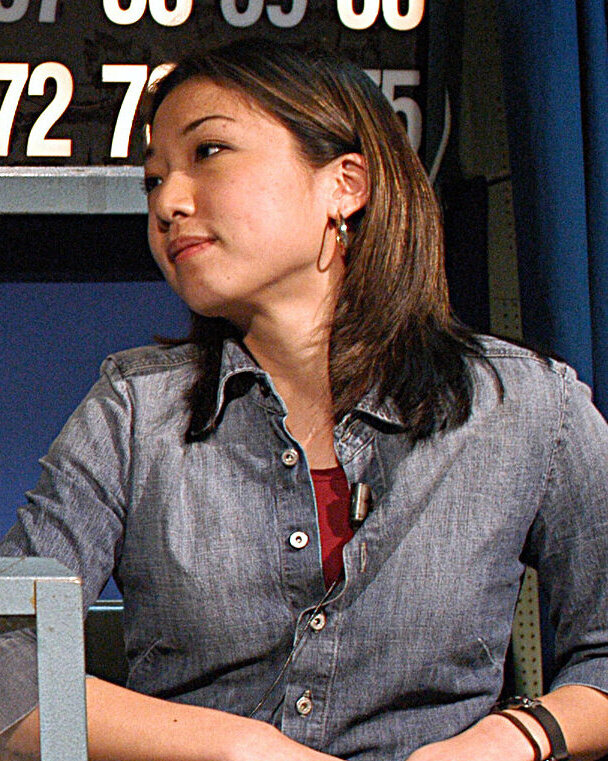
- Sy in 2003
- Born: January 16, 1977 (age 49); California, U.S.
- Education: University of Pennsylvania
- Occupations: News anchor, journalist
- Notable credit: Al Jazeera America News CBSN ABC News CNN CNN International Yahoo! News PBS Newshour Weekend Carnegie Council
- Children: 2
- Website: Stephanie Sy on X

Stephanie Sy (born January 16, 1977) is an American television journalist who works as a correspondent for PBS NewsHour.

== Early life and education ==
Sy, who is of Taiwanese heritage, was born and raised in southern California. Her mother, Li Sy, was an aspiring journalist who immigrated to the U.S. from Taiwan in the 1960s and enrolled at the University of Missouri as a journalism major; and her father, John J. Sy, worked as an engineer. She graduated from the University of Pennsylvania cum laude with a double major in international relations and environmental studies in 1999.

== Career ==
=== Early career and ABC ===
From August 1999 to 2001, Sy was a reporter and fill-in anchor for WBTW in Florence, South Carolina. In September 2001, she joined WTKR in Norfolk, Virginia, as a military reporter. Her reporting from Iraq while embedded in 2003 during the Iraq War led to her hiring by ABC News that year. Sy reported from London for ABC NewsOne until 2006, when she was a New York-based correspondent. In 2007, she became ABC’s Asia Correspondent in Beijing. She received the Overseas Press Club's David Kaplan Award for Spot News coverage for her coverage of the 2008 Sichuan earthquake . Sy was transferred to New York in 2009 and remained there until leaving the network in 2012. Other tasks at ABC included occasional fill-in anchoring on World News Now.

=== Post-ABC ===
From 2012 to 2013, Sy was senior editor and correspondent at Everyday Health. In 2013, she joined Al Jazeera America, where she anchored various newscasts, primarily the weekday morning news, and conducted occasional interviews for Talk to Al Jazeera. Sy won a 2014 Gracie Award for her interview "Talk to Al Jazeera: Gloria Steinem". After the Al Jazeera America network's closure in 2016, Sy was a freelance reporter for Yahoo News, primarily doing interviews. Starting around November 2017, she was also a freelancer anchor for CNN and CNN International. She filled in for Maggie Lake on CNN Money. She continued to freelance for Yahoo News and also for CBSN, CBS News's online streaming service. From 2015 to 2018 Sy hosted the Carnegie Council interview program Ethics Matter.

=== PBS Newshour ===
While working as a freelance journalist, Sy contributed to the PBS NewsHour Weekend. In 2019, she was named anchor for PBS NewsHour West, based at the Walter Cronkite School of Journalism of Arizona State University in Phoenix, and also correspondent for the PBS NewsHour. Sy was part of the PBS News team that won a Peabody Award in 2026 for its series "Immigration Crackdown"

== Personal life ==
As of 2021, Sy is unmarried. She last married journalist David Ariosto in June 2017 but the marriage ended in divorce in April 2021. Both partners had been previously married. Sy has two daughters, one from each marriage.

Sy is a member of the Carnegie Council for Ethics in International Affairs, a 501(c)(3) philanthropic organization committed to international cooperation based in New York City.
