= Lester Crystal =

American news executive (1934–2020)

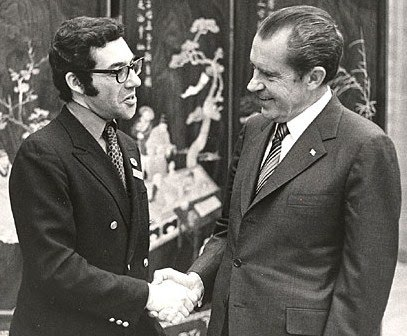
- Crystal meeting President Richard Nixon in China during historic visit in 1972
- Born: Lester Martin Crystal; September 13, 1934; Duluth, Minnesota, U.S.
- Died: June 24, 2020 (aged 85); New York City, New York, U.S.
- Education: M.S., Northwestern University
- Occupations: Television news producer, executive
- Known for: President of NBC News; executive producer of PBS NewsHour

Lester Martin Crystal (September 13, 1934 – June 24, 2020) was an Emmy Award-winning American television news executive best known for being the founding executive producer of the nation’s first hour-long nightly newscast, The MacNeil/Lehrer NewsHour (now called the PBS NewsHour), and also for being president of NBC News. He joined The NewsHour as executive producer in 1983 and was appointed president of MacNeil/Lehrer Productions in 2005, a position he held until his retirement in 2010. Prior to PBS, Crystal had a 20-year career at the National Broadcasting Company, where he served as president of NBC News from 1977–79, executive producer of NBC Nightly News from 1973–76, European field producer (based in London) of NBC Nightly News from 1970-1973 and producer of The Huntley-Brinkley Report from 1968-1970.

During his half-century in broadcast journalism, Crystal produced U.S. political convention and election night coverage for eight national elections from 1976 to 2004 for both NBC and PBS. He was part of the news delegation for United States President Richard Nixon's 1972 visit to China and produced NBC News' coverage of that historic visit. He won his first national Emmy Award in 1969 for producing an investigation of teenage drug addiction that aired on The Huntley–Brinkley Report.

== Personal life and education ==
Les Crystal was born to a Jewish family in Duluth, Minnesota, the son of Sara (née Davis) and Isadore Crystal, a delicatessen owner and wholesale food distributor. He graduated from Duluth East High School in 1952. He earned Bachelors and Masters of Science degrees from Northwestern University’s Medill School of Journalism in 1956 and 1957, respectively. He was inducted into the inaugural class of the Medill Hall of Achievement in 1997. Crystal was married to Toby (née Wilson) Crystal for 62 years until his death. Together, they had three children, Bradley, Alan, and Elizabeth. He died at the age of 85, following a two-and-a-half-year battle with brain cancer.
