= The Promise (podcast) =

Podcast produced by Nashville Public Radio

The Promise: Life, Death and Change in the Projects
- Genre: Investigative journalism, Social justice, Urban policy
- Language: English

Cast and voices
- Hosted by: Meribah Knight

Production
- Production: WPLN (Nashville Public Radio)
- Length: ~30–45 minutes

Publication
- Original release: 2018 – Present
- Provider: Nashville Public Radio
- Updates: Seasonal

Related
- Related shows: The Kids of Rutherford County
- Website: Official website

The Promise: Life, Death and Change in the Projects is a podcast produced by Nashville Public Radio.

== Background ==
The podcast is hosted by Meribah Knight and produced by WPLN. The show focuses on the James Cayce housing project in Nashville. The housing authority had a 600 million dollar redevelopment plan for the neighborhood that would involve tearing down old buildings and constructing new ones. The redevelopment plan is called Envision Cayce and was started in 2014. The podcast discusses gun violence. Knight decided to investigate disparities in housing and education after reporting on the shooting of Jocques Clemmons. The second season focuses on disparities in public education. The season specifically focuses on the racial desegregation of schools in Nashville.

Meribah Knight wrote an article called "Black Children Were Jailed for a Crime That Doesn't Exist. Almost Nothing Happened to the Adults in Charge.", which began her second podcast called The Kids of Rutherford County. The article was a 2022 finalist for a Pulitzer Prize for Feature Writing and won a 2021 Sidney Award.

== Reception ==
The New Yorker included the show on their lists of best podcasts in both 2018 and 2020. Season two won a Peabody Award in 2021.
