= Judy Woodruff =

American broadcast journalist (born 1946)

- Woodruff at Politics and Prose in 2026
- Born: Judy Carline Woodruff; November 20, 1946 (age 79); Tulsa, Oklahoma, U.S.
- Education: Duke University (BA)
- Occupation: Journalist
- Years active: 1970–present
- Television: PBS NewsHour
- Spouse: Al Hunt (m. 1980)
- Children: 3

Judy Carline Woodruff (born November 20, 1946) is an American broadcast journalist who has worked in local, network, cable, and public television news since 1970. She was the anchor and managing editor of the PBS NewsHour through the end of 2022. Woodruff has covered every presidential election and convention since 1976. She has interviewed several heads of state and moderated U.S. presidential debates.

After graduating from Duke University in 1968, Woodruff entered local television news in Atlanta. She was named White House correspondent for NBC News in 1976, a position she held for six years. She joined PBS in 1982, where she continued White House reports for the PBS NewsHour, formerly The MacNeil/Lehrer NewsHour, in addition to presenting another program. She moved to CNN in 1993 to host Inside Politics and CNN WorldView together with Bernard Shaw, until he left CNN. Woodruff left CNN in 2005, and returned to PBS and the NewsHour in 2006. In 2013, she and Gwen Ifill were its named official anchors, succeeding founding presenter Jim Lehrer. Woodruff and Ifill shared managing newsgathering duties until Ifill's death in 2016. Woodruff succeeded Ifill as the program's sole main presenter. In May 2022, Woodruff announced that she would step down as the NewsHour's anchor at year's end, and her final day as anchor was on December 30, 2022.

== Early life and education ==
Woodruff was born on November 20, 1946, in Tulsa, Oklahoma, to William H. Woodruff, a chief warrant officer in the Army, and Anna Lee (née Payne) Woodruff. She has one sister, Anita. She grew up as an army brat, and moved with her family multiple times during her childhood, attending seven schools between kindergarten and seventh grade. The family moved from Oklahoma to Germany when she was five years old. They then moved to army bases in Missouri and New Jersey, returned to Oklahoma, lived in Taiwan for a few years, and subsequently went to North Carolina, before settling in the Augusta, Georgia, area, when her father was stationed at Fort Gordon. Woodruff attended the Academy of Richmond County, a high school in Augusta. In 1963, she won the beauty pageant Young Miss Augusta.

Woodruff attended Meredith College in Raleigh, North Carolina, starting in 1964, initially pursuing a degree in mathematics. In an interview, she said that her political science teacher at Meredith got her interested in politics. After two years at Meredith, Woodruff transferred to Duke University in 1966. She was active in the student government of Duke, and was a member of the sorority Alpha Delta Pi.

While studying, Woodruff worked for Georgia Representative Robert Grier Stephens Jr. as an intern during two summers, but was discouraged from working in Washington, D.C., because of how women were treated there. Woodruff decided to enter journalism in her senior year. She graduated from Duke with a bachelor's degree in political science in 1968. She served on Duke's board of trustees between 1985 and 1997. Woodruff received an honorary degree (DHL) from Duke in 1998 and was also awarded honorary degrees by the University of Scranton in 1991 and by the University of Pennsylvania (LL.D.) in 2005.

== Career ==
=== From local television to White House correspondent ===
Woodruff applied for her first job in journalism during the spring break of her senior year at Duke. She was hired as a secretary at the news department of the ABC affiliate in Atlanta, Georgia (WQXI-TV), and began working after she graduated in 1968. Besides being a secretary, she presented the weather forecast on Sundays in her last six months at the station. Woodruff left the affiliate after a year and a half to move to the local CBS affiliate WAGA-TV in 1970, working as a reporter. She covered the Georgia State Legislature, and anchored the noon and evening news.

In 1975, she moved to NBC, where she served as a general-assignment reporter based in Atlanta. Together with Kenley Jones, she covered the southeast, an area spanning 10 states, and the Caribbean. Woodruff was assigned to cover Jimmy Carter's successful 1976 presidential campaign for NBC, when Carter was not yet seen as a major contender. She had already covered Carter's second gubernatorial campaign in 1970 for WAGA. Woodruff traveled with Carter's presidential campaign until she was taken off the campaign trail halfway through 1976. Although she was not on the campaign trail anymore, she kept reporting about the Carter campaign for NBC. After he won the presidency and was inaugurated on January 20, 1977, she moved to Washington, D.C., to become a White House correspondent for NBC News. She continued covering the White House into the Reagan presidency until 1982. Subsequently, she was Chief Washington correspondent for The Today Show on NBC for a year.

Woodruff moved to PBS in mid-1983, becoming the chief Washington correspondent for The MacNeil/Lehrer NewsHour, when the duration of that program was extended to one hour. In addition to reporting on politics, she conducted studio interviews and served as a backup anchor. Woodruff started hosting the weekly documentary series Frontline with Judy Woodruff a few months later in 1984 after its presenter Jessica Savitch died in October the year before. Woodruff left Frontline in 1990 to spend more time with her family and at the NewsHour. While at PBS, she covered all presidential conventions and campaigns, and moderated the 1988 vice-presidential debate between United States Senators Dan Quayle (R-IN) and Lloyd Bentsen (D-TX). The debate is remembered for the remark "I served with Jack Kennedy, I knew Jack Kennedy, Jack Kennedy was a friend of mine. Senator, you're no Jack Kennedy", made by Senator Bentsen.

=== CNN and years after ===
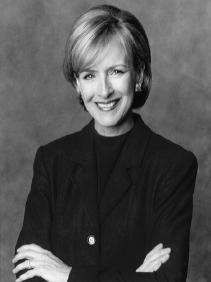
Woodruff in 1998

Woodruff left the NewsHour in 1993 to move to CNN. She was first asked to work for CNN by Tom Johnson at the end of 1992, and took the job four months later after some initial hesitation. Woodruff was teased about this move by her colleague Jim Lehrer: "When I left the 'NewsHour' for a spell to work for a cable-news channel, he always inquired about life at the 'Home Shopping Network'". In June 1993, Woodruff started anchoring the political talk show Inside Politics, that aired on weekdays, together with Bernard Shaw, and the international news program The World Today together with Frank Sesno. Sesno was replaced by Shaw in May 1994. When the daily world affairs program CNN WorldView was launched in 1995, Woodruff and Shaw became the hosts.

She remained co-anchor of WorldView until it went off the air in 2001. In February 2001, Shaw retired, causing Woodruff to become the sole host of Inside Politics, which was subsequently renamed Judy Woodruff's Inside Politics. During her time at CNN, Woodruff also co-anchored CNN's election coverage and the news shows Live From... and CNN NewsStand on Wednesdays. She was the sole anchor of the 1996 documentary series Democracy in America as well. She reported on the 1995 World Conference on Women in Beijing, and co-anchored CNN's special coverage of, among other things, President Richard Nixon's funeral, the Centennial Olympic Park bombing, 9/11, the War in Afghanistan, the Space Shuttle Columbia disaster, and the Iraq War.

Woodruff moderated three Republican presidential primary debates and one Democratic debate during the 2000 campaign season and one Democratic debate during the 2004 campaign season.

Woodruff left CNN in June 2005, after her contract expired, in order to teach, write, and work on a long-form television project. She was a visiting fellow at the Shorenstein Center on Media, Politics and Public Policy at Harvard University in the fall of 2005, and taught a course at the Sanford School of Public Policy at Duke University on media and politics in the fall of 2006. Additionally, Woodruff started hosting Conversations with Judy Woodruff, a monthly Bloomberg Television program, in which she interviewed people, in 2006. She also hosted the Bloomberg election night coverage of the 2006 midterms. Woodruff continued presenting Conversations with Judy Woodruff until 2013.

=== Return to PBS ===
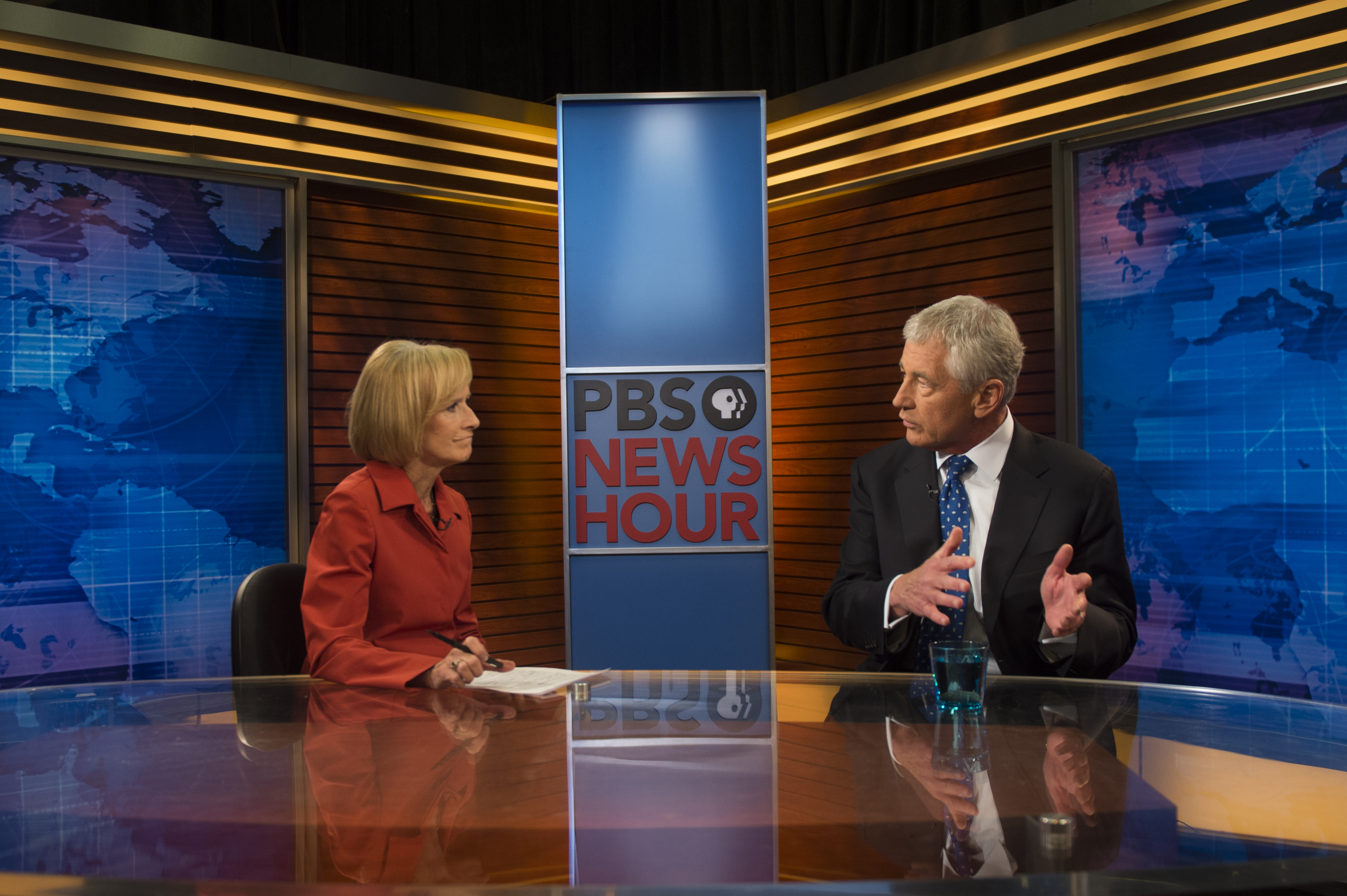
Woodruff, while interviewing then Secretary of Defense Chuck Hagel on the PBS NewsHour in September 2013

Woodruff started working for MacNeil/Lehrer Productions in 2006 on the multimedia project Generation Next: Speak Up. Be Heard, about the views of Americans between the ages of 16 and 25. The project included a PBS documentary series, segments on the NewsHour, a series of NPR specials, and articles on the Internet and in USA Today. Woodruff returned to The NewsHour with Jim Lehrer as a special correspondent that same year, and became a senior correspondent a few months later in February 2007. As a senior correspondent, she reported, conducted studio interviews, was part of the political team, and occasionally filled in as anchor. In December 2009, the news program moved to a dual-anchor format, and changed its name to PBS NewsHour. Jim Lehrer, the main anchor was alternately joined by Woodruff, Gwen Ifill, and Jeffrey Brown.

Lehrer stepped down as anchor of the NewsHour in June 2011, which resulted in the news program being anchored by Woodruff, Ifill, Brown, Ray Suarez, and Margaret Warner on a rotating basis. Earlier that year, the documentary Nancy Reagan: The Role of a Lifetime, of which Woodruff was the principal reporter, was released. In September 2013, she became co-anchor of the PBS NewsHour, presenting the program with Gwen Ifill on weekdays and alone on Fridays. It was the first time an American network broadcast had been anchored by two women. Besides the NewsHour itself, the duo also presented PBS coverage of special events, including presidential conventions, election night, and States of the Union. In February 2016, Woodruff and Ifill moderated the sixth Democratic presidential debate. When Ifill died in November 2016, Woodruff became the sole anchor of the NewsHour. PBS initially sought a replacement for Ifill, but in March 2018, formalized Woodruff's position as "solo anchor". During the 2020 presidential election season, she was one of the moderators of the sixth Democratic debate.

In 2017, The New York Times wrote of her performance on the NewsHour: "Ms. Woodruff's measured delivery, with her hands clasped and her voice low, stands as a counterweight to a haywire era of American news."

In May 2022, Woodruff announced that she would step down as the NewsHour's anchor at the end of the year, but planned to continue contributing to the program as senior correspondent. Her last day anchoring the program was December 30, 2022.

== Other activities and accolades ==
Woodruff wrote the book This Is Judy Woodruff at the White House, in which she described her experiences as a journalist. It was published by Addison-Wesley in 1982. Over her career, she has advocated women's organizations, and was part of a group of journalists that founded the International Women's Media Foundation, an organization that internationally supports women in the media, in 1990. She has served on its board of directors, and is part of its advisory council.

Woodruff and her husband, Al Hunt, have actively supported families of children with spina bifida (a condition shared by their eldest son, Jeffrey) with counseling and other necessary services. The couple helped organize the Spina Bifida Association of America's annual roast, during which politicians roast journalists to raise funds for the association. The event, broadcast by C-SPAN, was held between 1989 and 2008.

Woodruff has also served on the boards of trustees of a number of other organizations, including the Newseum, the Freedom Forum, the National Museum of American History, Global Rights, the Carnegie Corporation of New York, America's Promise, the Urban Institute, The Duke Endowment, and the John S. Knight Journalism Fellowships at Stanford.

Woodruff is a member of the Council on Foreign Relations and the American Academy of Arts and Sciences and a former member of the Knight Commission.

In August 2023, Woodruff was awarded the Kettering Foundation Katherine W. Fanning Fellowship in Journalism and Democracy.

=== Awards ===
Year	Award	Organization	Notes	Ref
1986	Joan Shorenstein Barone Award	Radio and Television Correspondents' Association	First time the accolade was awarded	
1996	News & Documentary Emmy Award in the category "Outstanding Instant Coverage of a Single Breaking News Story"	National Academy of Television Arts and Sciences	Together with others of CNN for the coverage of the Centennial Olympic Park bombing	
1998–99	Futrell Award	Duke University		
1995	Al Neuharth Award for Excellence in the Media	Newseum and University of South Dakota	Together with her husband Al Hunt	
1996	CableACE Award in the category "Newscaster"	NCTA	Together with Bernard Shaw	
2003	International Matrix Award	Association for Women in Communications		
2003	Leonard Zeidenberg First Amendment Award	Radio Television Digital News Association		
2009	Duke Distinguished Alumni Award	Duke University		
2010	Edward R. Murrow Lifetime Achievement Award in Television	Washington State University		
2012	Gaylord Prize for Excellence in Journalism and Mass Communication	University of Oklahoma		
2016	Pat Mitchell Lifetime AchievementAward	Women's Media Center	Together with Gwen Ifill	
2016	Foremother Award	National Center for Health Research		
2017	Medal for Lifetime Achievement in Journalism	Poynter Institute		
2017	Radcliffe medal	Radcliffe Institute for Advanced Study	Together with Gwen Ifill (posthumously)	
2017	Walter Cronkite Award for Excellence in Journalism	Arizona State University	Together with Gwen Ifill (posthumously)	
2017	Gwen Ifill Press Freedom Award	Committee to Protect Journalists	First time the accolade was awarded	
2021	Larry Foster Award for Integrity in Public Communication	Arthur W. Page Center for Integrity in Public Communication	Honored with Dr. Anthony Fauci, Eugene Robinson (journalist) and Bill Heyman	
2021	Journalistic Integrity Award	Peabody Awards		

In 2003, Woodruff was inducted into the Georgia Association of Broadcasters Hall of Fame.

== Personal life ==
Woodruff is married to Al Hunt, a columnist and former reporter, and they live in Washington, D.C., with another residence in nearby Maryland. They met during a softball game between journalists and staff of the Carter presidential campaign in Plains, Georgia, in 1976. Their wedding took place on April 5, 1980, in St. Alban's Episcopal Church in Washington, D.C. The couple has three children: Jeffrey (1981), Benjamin (1986), and Lauren (1989). Woodruff gave birth to Jeffrey about five hours after appearing on air. Jeffrey was born with a mild case of spina bifida, and became disabled and brain damaged after surgery in 1998, which caused Woodruff to reduce her workload at CNN. Lauren was adopted from Korea when she was four months old.

Media offices
Preceded by Jim Lehrer	PBS NewsHour anchor With: Gwen Ifill (2013–2016)	Succeeded by Amna Nawaz and Geoff Bennett
