= PBS News Hour =

Public television newscast in the United States

- Also known as: The Robert MacNeil Report (1975–1976); The MacNeil/Lehrer Report (1976–1983); The MacNeil/Lehrer NewsHour (1983–1995); The NewsHour with Jim Lehrer (1995–2009); PBS NewsHour Weekend (weekend editions, 2013–2022); PBS News Weekend (weekend editions, 2022–2026); PBS News Hour West (western edition, 2019–2025); Horizons from PBS News (Saturdays); Compass Points from PBS News (Sundays)
- Genre: News program
- Created by: Robert MacNeil; Jim Lehrer; Lester Crystal
- Directed by: Sean Patrick (weekday editions); Chip Hirzel (weekend editions)
- Presented by: Weekdays: Amna Nawaz; Geoff Bennett; Weekends: William Brangham; Nick Schifrin
- Theme music composer: Bernard Hoffer (1975–2006); David Cebert and Bernard Hoffer (2006–2015); Edd Kalehoff (2015–present)
- Country of origin: United States
- Original language: English

Production
- Executive producers: Sara Just (weekday editions); Max McClellan (weekend editions)
- Production locations: WETA-TV studios, Arlington County, Virginia; Walter Cronkite School of Journalism and Mass Communication at Arizona State University, Phoenix, Arizona (Western editions; 2019–2025)
- Camera setup: Multi-camera
- Running time: 60 minutes (1983–present, weekday editions); 30 minutes (1975–1983, weekday editions; 2013–present, weekend editions)
- Production companies: Thirteen/WNET New York (weekday editions, 1975–2014; weekend editions, 2013–2022); WETA Washington, D.C. (weekday editions, 1975–present; weekend editions, 2022–2026); MacNeil/Lehrer Productions (1981–2014); NewsHour Productions (2014–present)

Original release
- Network: PBS
- Release: October 20, 1975 – present

Related
- Competitors: ABC World News Tonight; NBC Nightly News; CBS Evening News

PBS News Hour (previously stylized as PBS NewsHour) is an American daily evening television news program broadcast on more than 350 PBS member stations since October 20, 1975. The nightly broadcast is known for its in-depth coverage of important issues and current events. The hourlong weekday editions have been anchored by Amna Nawaz and Geoff Bennett since January 2, 2023. The half-hour PBS News Weekend editions were anchored by John Yang from December 31, 2022, to January 11, 2026.

Broadcasts are produced by PBS member station WETA-TV in Washington, D.C., from its studio facilities in Arlington, Virginia. From 2019 to 2025, news updates inserted into the weekday broadcasts targeted viewers in the Western United States and online have been anchored by Stephanie Sy, originating from the Walter Cronkite School of Journalism and Mass Communication at Arizona State University. Additional production facilities for the program are based in San Francisco and Denver. The program is a collaboration between WETA-TV and PBS member station WNET in New York City, along with KQED in San Francisco, KETC in St. Louis, and WTTW in Chicago.

The program debuted in 1975 as The Robert MacNeil Report before being renamed The MacNeil/Lehrer Report one year later. It was anchored by Robert MacNeil from WNET's studios and Jim Lehrer from WETA's studios. In 1983, the show was rebranded as The MacNeil/Lehrer NewsHour, and then The NewsHour with Jim Lehrer following MacNeil's departure in 1995. It was then renamed to its current PBS NewsHour title in 2009, two years before Lehrer left in 2011. Originally, the program only aired on weekdays before weekend editions began in 2013. Production of the weekend broadcasts were solely produced by WNET, before the New York City station transferred all of its PBS NewsHour involvement to WETA in April 2022.

== History ==
=== Ownership ===
In September 1981, production of the program was taken over by MacNeil/Lehrer Productions, a partnership between Robert MacNeil, Jim Lehrer, and Gannett; the latter sold its stake in the production company in 1986. John C. Malone's Liberty Media bought a 67 percent controlling equity stake in MacNeil/Lehrer Productions in 1994, but MacNeil and Lehrer retained editorial control. In 2014, MacNeil/Lehrer Productions, owned by MacNeil, Lehrer, and Liberty Media, announced the donation of the company to WETA-TV to become a nonprofit subsidiary of WETA-TV under the name NewsHour Productions LLC.

=== The Robert MacNeil Report and The MacNeil/Lehrer Report (1975–1983) ===
External videos
- The Robert MacNeil Report; 19; New York City and C367 Bailout, segment starts at 2:45, November 13, 1975, NewsHour Productions and American Archive of Public Broadcasting

In 1973, Robert MacNeil (a former NBC News correspondent and then-moderator of PBS's Washington Week in Review) and Jim Lehrer teamed up to cover the United States Senate's Watergate hearings for PBS. They earned an Emmy Award for their unprecedented gavel-to-gavel coverage.

This recognition led to the creation of The Robert MacNeil Report, a half-hour local news program on WNET, which debuted on October 20, 1975; each episode of the program covered a single issue in depth. On December 1, 1975, the program began to air on PBS stations nationwide. It was renamed The MacNeil/Lehrer Report on September 6, 1976. Most editions employed a two-anchor, two-city format, with MacNeil based in New York City and Lehrer at WETA's studios in Arlington, Virginia. Charlayne Hunter-Gault joined the series as a correspondent in 1977, serving as a substitute host for MacNeil and Lehrer whenever either had the night off. She became the series' national correspondent in 1983.

=== The MacNeil/Lehrer NewsHour and The NewsHour with Jim Lehrer (1983–2009) ===
Having decided to start competing with the nightly news programs on ABC, CBS and NBC instead of complementing them, the program expanded to one hour on September 5, 1983, incorporating other changes, such as the introduction of "documentary reportage from the field"; it became known at that time as The MacNeil/Lehrer NewsHour. Lester Crystal was its founding executive producer. MacNeil/Lehrer Productions twice planned to launch late-night newscasts in 1995 and 1999; in both instances, the proposed expansions—which, respectively, were to have involved production and newsgathering partnerships with Wall Street Journal Television and The New York Times—were canceled mid-development.

MacNeil retired from the program on October 20, 1995, leaving Lehrer as the sole anchor. Accordingly, the program was renamed The NewsHour with Jim Lehrer on October 23. (Hunter-Gault left in June 1997.) On January 16, 1996, The NewsHour announced the creation of its official website at PBS Online. The NewsHour won a Peabody Award in 2003 for the feature report Jobless Recovery: Non-Working Numbers. On May 17, 1999, The NewsHour adopted a new graphics package with refreshed music from 1983, plus the new studio with a blue globe in the middle. On October 4, 1999, Gwen Ifill and Ray Suarez joined Margaret Warner and Elizabeth Farnsworth as Senior Correspondents.

For most of the 2000s, the broadcast would open with Lehrer as anchor, a Kwame Holman report on the days news from Washington, and 3 packaged reports and follow-up discussions from Warner, Ifill, Suarez and Farnsworth.

Effective January 17, 2000, The NewsHour added "America Online Keyword: PBS" to its ending screen for a three-year agreement through April 22, 2003. For only the website, the program took effect on April 23, 2003. On March 3, 2003, the program added dates from the 1999 graphics in the beginning. On November 17, 2003, The NewsHour added music in the beginning with dates.

On May 17, 2006, the program underwent its first major change in presentation in years, adopting a new graphics package and a reorchestrated version of its theme music (originally composed by Bernard Hoffer). On December 17, 2007, the NewsHour became the second nightly broadcast network newscast to begin broadcasting in high definition (after NBC Nightly News on March 26, 2007), with broadcasts in a letterboxed format for viewers with standard-definition television sets watching via either cable or satellite television. The program also introduced a new set and converted its graphics package to HD.

=== PBS NewsHour ===
==== Departure of Jim Lehrer and switch to co-anchors (2009–2013) ====
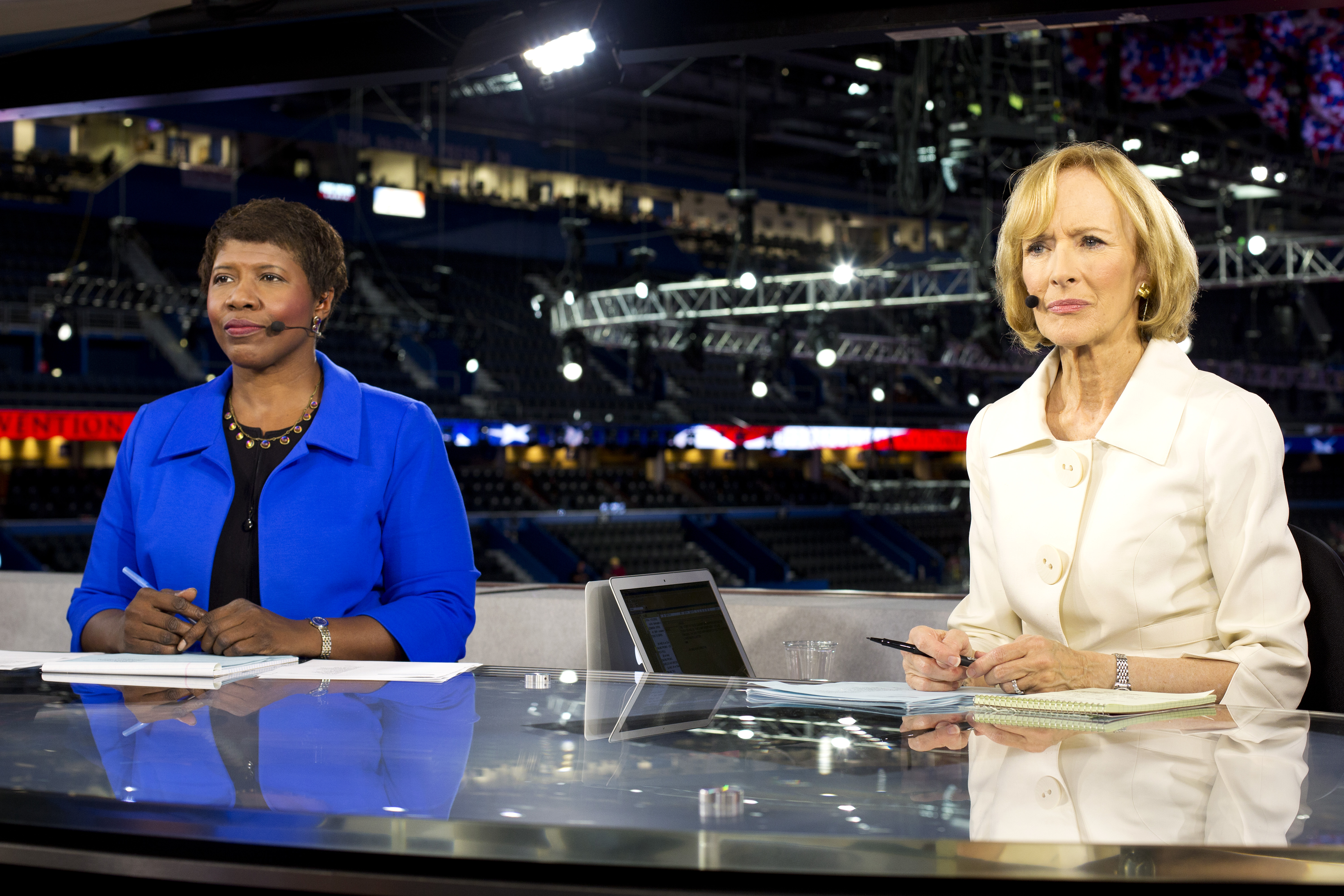
Gwen Ifill and Judy Woodruff at the 2012 Republican National Convention on August 27, 2012

Former logo used from 2009 to 2024

On May 11, 2009, PBS announced that the program would be revamped on December 7 of that year under a revised title, the PBS NewsHour. In addition to increased integration between the NewsHour website and nightly broadcast, the updated production returned to a two-anchor format. Lehrer described the overhaul as the first phase in his move toward retirement.

On September 27, 2010, PBS NewsHour was presented with the Chairman's Award at the 31st News & Documentary Emmy Awards, with MacNeil, Lehrer, Crystal, and former executive producer Linda Winslow receiving the award on the show's behalf.

Lehrer formally ended his tenure as a regular anchor of the program on June 6, 2011. He continued to occasionally anchor on Fridays, when he usually led the political analysis segment with syndicated columnist Mark Shields and The New York Times columnist David Brooks, until December 30, 2011. PBS NewsHour continues with various anchors until September 6, 2013.

==== Transfer of production, expansion to weekends and the west (2013–present) ====
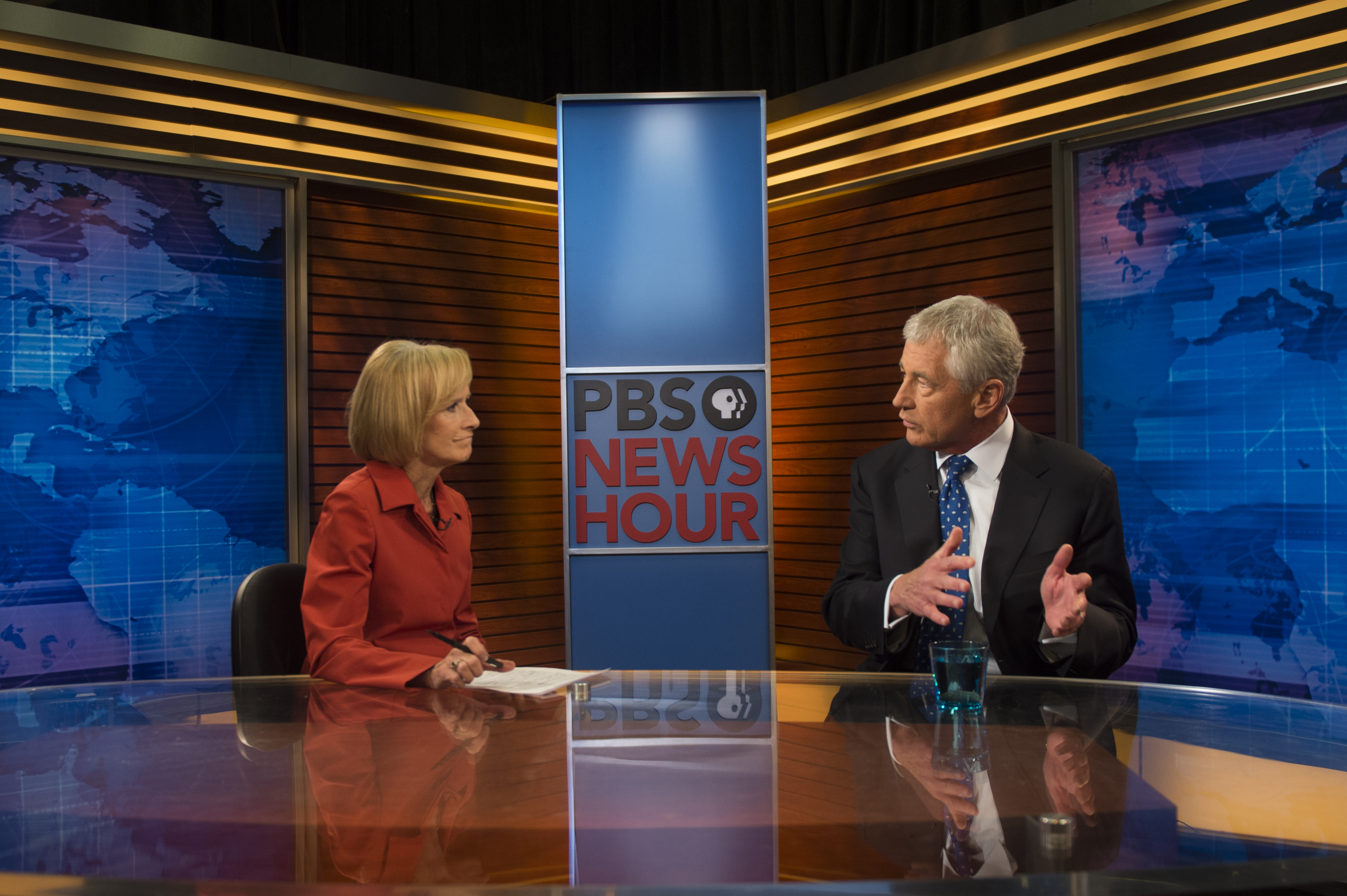
Judy Woodruff interviewing US Secretary of Defense Chuck Hagel on September 18, 2013

On August 6, 2013, Gwen Ifill and Judy Woodruff were named co-anchors and co-managing editors of the NewsHour. They shared anchor duties on the Monday through Thursday editions, with Woodruff anchoring solo on Fridays due to Ifill's duties as host of the political discussion program Washington Week, which was also produced Friday evenings.

For much of its history, the PBS NewsHour aired only Monday through Friday, but in March 2013, plans to expand the program to include Saturday and Sunday editions were under development. PBS NewsHour announced that the weekend editions of the program would premiere on September 7, 2013, with Hari Sreenivasan serving as anchor. Although they aired for a half-hour, the weekend broadcasts were branded with a modified program name, PBS NewsHour Weekend. The program was based on the duration of WNET's involvement with the program. From the weekend broadcasts' debut until the March 27, 2022, edition, the Saturday and Sunday editions originated from the Tisch/WNET Studios at Lincoln Center in Manhattan, rather than the program's main production facilities at the Arlington, Virginia, studios of WETA-TV.

MacNeil/Lehrer Productions announced in October 2013 that it had offered to transfer ownership in the PBS NewsHour to WETA. Lehrer and MacNeil cited their reduced involvement with the program's production since their departures from anchoring, as well as "the probability of increasing our fundraising abilities." WETA's board of trustees approved the transfer on June 17, 2014, and it took effect on July 1. At that time, NewsHour Productions, LLC, a wholly owned subsidiary of WETA, took over production of the program. WETA also acquired MacNeil/Lehrer Productions' archives, documentaries, and projects, though not the company's name. PBS NewsHour Weekend was not affected by the ownership transfer and continued to be produced by WNET until 2022 when the program moved back to Washington.

On July 20, 2015, the PBS NewsHour introduced an overhauled visual appearance for its weekday broadcasts, debuting a new minimalist set designed by Eric Siegel and George Allison that heavily incorporates PBS's longtime "Everyman" logo. The program also introduced a new graphics package by Troika Design Group and original theme music by Edd Kalehoff, which incorporates a reorchestration of the nine-note "Question and Answer" musical signature that has been featured in the program's theme since its premiere in 1975 and a musical signature originally incorporated into the Kalehoff-composed theme for the Nightly Business Report used from 2002 to 2010. PBS NewsHour Weekend retained its original graphics package and the theme music by David Cebert and Bernard Hoffer until August 29, 2015, when it transitioned to the same theme music and a reworked version of the graphics package used for the weekday broadcasts.

Ifill took brief breaks from her NewsHour anchor duties in the late spring and in November 2016 (and was also absent from the program's presidential election coverage on November 8), as she had been undergoing treatment for advanced stage breast and endometrial cancer. After her death was announced on November 14, 2016, that evening's edition of the PBS NewsHour was dedicated to Ifill and her influence on journalism, featuring tributes from Woodruff, Sreenivasan, former colleagues and program contributors (news content was relegated to the standard news summary, which aired during the second half-hour). Although the program initially featured guest anchors on some editions between January and March 2017, Woodruff went on to become sole anchor.

The Plastic Problem aired in 2018 and went on to win a Peabody Award, presented at the 2019 ceremony.

PBS News Hour West launched on October 14, 2019, a regional bureau affiliated with the Walter Cronkite School of Journalism and Mass Communication at Arizona State University in Phoenix. Anchored by Stephanie Sy, the bureau produces its own news summary with up-to-date information on events that develop after the original broadcast. A version of the program with this summary is shown to viewers in the Western United States and to online and East Coast viewers watching re-broadcasts. The program PBS News Hour West ended its operations on December 19, 2025.

On April 2, 2022, WETA assumed production responsibilities for the show's Saturday and Sunday editions, which concurrently began originating from the studio at the station's Washington facility used for the weekday broadcasts. The broadcasts were retitled as PBS News Weekend, with respect to their shorter duration. NewsHour Productions transferred production of the weekend broadcasts from WNET in a move to streamline the program's production and news-gathering resources, allowing the weekday and weekend news broadcasts to have the same pool of correspondents and to share resources with Washington Week (also produced by WETA-TV). Coinciding with the move, the weekend editions began carrying feature segments covering culture and the arts. Sreenivasan (who remains a New York-based correspondent for the weekday broadcasts and serves as a contributor for the PBS latenight news program Amanpour & Company) was initially replaced as weekend anchor by former NBC News and MSNBC correspondent Geoff Bennett, until John Yang was established as the weekend anchor since December 31, 2022 (New Year's Eve).

Woodruff announced in May 2022 that she would step down as anchor at the end of the year, with plans for ongoing reporting on longer pieces as well as WETA projects and specials. Amna Nawaz and Geoff Bennett were named Woodruff's successors. Woodruff made her final anchor broadcast on December 30, 2022, while Nawaz and Bennett co-anchored their first broadcast on January 2, 2023.

PBS News Weekly, a digital-only half-hour series of News Hour segments from the prior week, premiered on December 15, 2023, initially hosted by Nick Schifrin and broadcast on Fridays.

PBS News Hour introduced a new logo and the new studio (still at WETA) on June 10, 2024, now featuring the current PBS logo, with the program's graphics rendered in the system's proprietary PBS Sans typeface family introduced in 2019. (Note: PBS had revised its brand identity in 2019.) At the same time, the program's longstanding use of camel case in its name was discontinued, with "NewsHour" becoming "News Hour", in conjunction with the network's rebranding news operation as PBS News.

For the first time in more than 40 years, the Corporation for Public Broadcasting was not among the sponsors for the show on July 21, 2025. Nawaz and Bennett addressed the absence at the end of that night's broadcast. Among the impact of funding cuts, two programs, PBS News Hour West and PBS News Weekend, aired their last episodes on December 19, 2025, and January 11, 2026, respectively. PBS News replaced the weekend show with two weekend current affairs programs: Horizons (on Saturdays) hosted by William Brangham and Compass Points (on Sundays) hosted by Nick Schifrin.

== Production and ratings ==
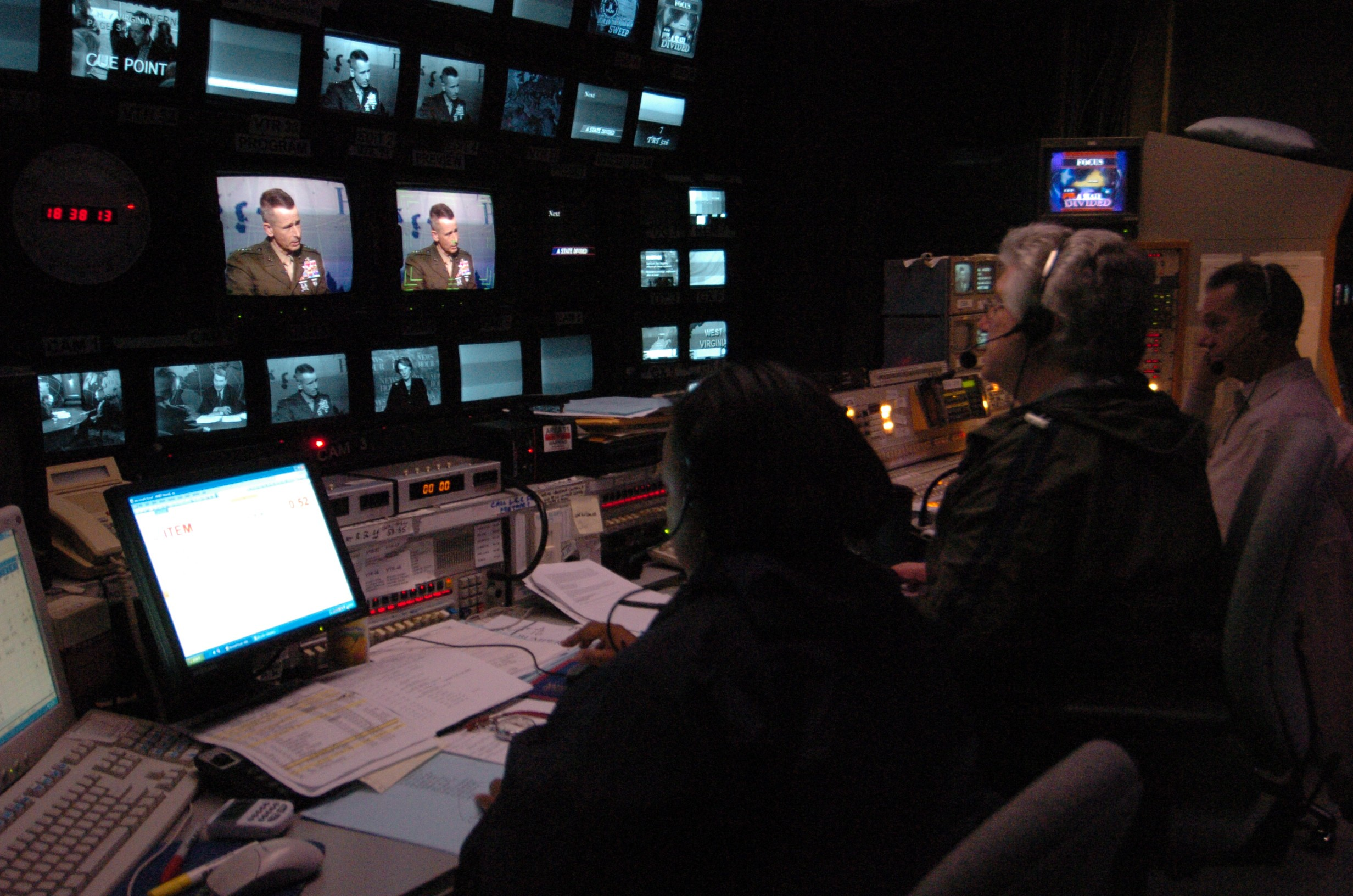
Behind the scenes at The NewsHour, during a Gen. Peter Pace interview on November 7, 2005

PBS News Hour is notable for being shown on public television, as there are no interruptions for commercial advertisements. But, like most public television programming, there are "corporate image" advertisements at the beginning and end of each broadcast; and there may be "barker" interruptions during locally produced pledge drives that ask viewers to donate to their local PBS member station or member network. Those stations not programming a pledge drive typically provide encore presentations from their archives.

The program has a more deliberate pace than the news broadcasts of the commercial networks it competes against, allowing for deeper detail in its story packages and feature segments. At the start of the program, the lead story is covered in depth, followed by a news summary that lasts roughly between six and eight minutes, briefly explaining many of the top national and international news headlines; international stories often include excerpts of reports filed by ITN correspondents. This is usually followed by three or four longer news segments, typically running six to twelve minutes, which explore a few of the events mentioned in the headline segment in depth and include discussions with experts, newsmakers, and/or commentators. The program formerly included a reflective essay on a regular basis, but these have been curtailed in recent years; since Woodruff and Ifill became anchors, these essays have mainly aired as part of the end-of-show segment "Brief, but Spectacular".

On Fridays, the program features political analysis and discussion between two regular contributors, one from each of the Republican and Democratic parties, and one host from among the senior correspondents. Since January 2021, the usual participants have been MS NOW co-host Jonathan Capehart and The New York Times columnist David Brooks. Analysts who fill in when Capehart or Brooks are absent have included David Gergen, Thomas Oliphant, Rich Lowry, William Kristol, Ramesh Ponnuru, Ruth Marcus, Michael Gerson, David Corn and E. J. Dionne. On Mondays, a similar segment, "Politics Monday", features analysis and discussion of political issues with contributors Amy Walter, national editor of The Cook Political Report, and Tamara Keith, Washington, D.C. correspondent for NPR.

The program's senior correspondents are Woodruff and Jeffrey Brown (Arts, Culture & Society). Essayists have included Anne Taylor Fleming, Richard Rodriguez, Clarence Page and Roger Rosenblatt. Correspondents have been Tom Bearden, Betty Ann Bowser, Susan Dentzer, Elizabeth Farnsworth, Kwame Holman, Spencer Michels, Fred de Sam Lazaro, the economics correspondent Paul Solman (Making Sen$e), Malcolm Brabant and others.

Lehrer and Ifill were frequent moderators of U.S. political debates. By November 2008, Lehrer had moderated more than ten debates between major U.S. presidential candidates. In 2008, Ifill moderated a debate between U.S. vice presidential candidates Joe Biden and Sarah Palin; in 2004, she moderated a debate between candidates Dick Cheney and John Edwards.

According to Nielsen ratings at the program's website, 2.7 million people watch the program each night, and 8 million watch in the course of a week.

=== Honor Roll segment ===
On March 31, 2003, after the U.S.–led invasion of Iraq in 2003, the PBS News Hour began what it called its "Honor Roll", a short segment displaying in silence the picture, name, rank, and hometown of U.S. military personnel killed in Iraq. On January 4, 2006, military personnel killed in Afghanistan were added to the segment. PBS News Hour aired its final honor roll segment on August 30, 2021, after the end of War in Afghanistan. A special honor roll segment aired on December 17, 2012, on 27 people killed in a school shooting in Newtown, Connecticut.

== Availability ==
Logo of PBS News Hour West, Western edition of PBS News Hour

The PBS News Hour is broadcast on more than 350 PBS member stations and member networks, making it available to 99 percent of the viewing public, and audio from the program is broadcast by some NPR radio stations. It is also rebroadcast twice daily in late night via American Public Television's World digital subchannel service. Broadcasts of the PBS News Hour are also made available worldwide via satellites operated by various agencies such as the Voice of America.

A limited number of PBS member stations and regional member networks do not clear the PBS News Hour on their schedules due to existing carriage on a "primary" PBS member station, a pool mainly confined to "secondary" stations (most of which participate in the service's Program Differentiation Plan) that share certain media markets with a "primary" member outlet. These include the NJ PBS network in New Jersey (as WNET and its sister station WLIW, carries the program in the New York City area, the latter airing the program live, while WHYY-TV does so in the Philadelphia market); KVCR-DT in San Bernardino, California; and WYIN in Gary, Indiana (WTTW, the primary PBS station for the Chicago DMA that includes WYIN's Northwest Indiana service area, serves as the program's carrier in the Chicago market). In Boston, WGBH-TV airs the program live each weeknight (with a simulcast online), while its secondary station WGBX rebroadcasts the weekday editions later the same evening, and the weekend editions live; a similar case exists in New York City but in reverse, where WLIW airs the weekday and weekend editions of the PBS News Hour live while WNET airs them on a tape delay (delayed by one hour on weekday editions and by a half-hour on weekends). KQED in San Francisco airs the program each weeknight in simulcast with its radio sister at 3:00 p.m. Pacific Time (6:00 p.m. Eastern Time), in addition to airing the Western Edition on television at 6:00 p.m. PT. Similarly, KCET in Los Angeles, which shares ownership with KOCE-TV in Huntington Beach through parent Public Media Group of Southern California, carries the live feed at 3:00 p.m. Pacific Time, while KOCE-TV airs the 6:00 p.m. Western Edition; both stations thus serve together as the program's carrier in the Los Angeles market. Unusually for many years, the secondary station of Milwaukee PBS, WMVT, carried the program as part of an early-evening news block with the Nightly Business Report (which was the lead-in to News Hour on many member stations until its series finale on December 27, 2019), and half-hour international newscasts from Deutsche Welle and BBC World News, due to an expanded schedule of PBS Kids and local-interest programming on WMVS; this has since been rectified with the launch of the all-hours PBS Kids subchannel network.

Archives of shows broadcast after February 7, 2000, are available in several streaming media formats (including full-motion video) at the program's website. The show is available to overseas military personnel on the American Forces Network. Audio from selected segments is also released in podcast form, available through several feeds on the PBS News Hour's subscriptions page with link to a FeedBurner website (for free mp3 download) and through podcast services such as Apple Podcasts, Google Podcasts, Spotify, and among others.

=== Livestreaming ===
PBS News logo used since June 17, 2024 as a branding name for digital and social media platforms as well as news division name of itself.

The PBS News Hour is streamed live on the program's YouTube channel at 6:00 p.m. Eastern Time each weeknight, with the Western edition also streaming live at 9:00 p.m. ET (6:00 p.m. Pacific Time). PBS News Weekend is also streamed on the YouTube channel live Saturdays and Sundays at 5:00 p.m. ET. Full episodes are available later on the PBS News YouTube channel and on the program's dedicated page on PBS's website.

The News Hour was also livestreamed on Ustream until IBM Watson Media discontinued free livestreaming on the platform on September 17, 2018. The News Hour has also provided livestreaming of special events, most notably streaming the January 2017 inauguration of Donald Trump on the program's Twitter account.

== International broadcasts ==
- In Australia the program is seen Tuesdays through Saturdays at 1:00 p.m. AEST on SBS.
- In New Zealand the NewsHour is seen Tuesdays through Saturdays at 10 p.m. on Face TV (Auckland).
- In Japan the program is seen Tuesdays through Friday on NHK BS.
- Around the world for members of the United States Armed Forces on the American Forces Network.
- The program is seen internationally through the Voice of America.

== PBS News Hour editorial guidelines ==
On December 4, 2009, when introducing the new PBS NewsHour format, Lehrer read a list of guidelines for what he called "MacNeil/Lehrer journalism":

- "Do nothing I cannot defend."
- "Cover, write, and present every story with the care I would want if the story were about me."
- "Assume there is at least one other side or version to every story."
- "Assume the viewer is as smart and as caring and as good a person as I am."
- "Assume the same about all people on whom I report."
- "Assume personal lives are a private matter until a legitimate turn in the story absolutely mandates otherwise."
- "Carefully separate opinion and analysis from straight news stories, and clearly label everything."
- "Do not use anonymous sources or blind quotes except on rare and monumental occasions."
- "No one should ever be allowed to attack another anonymously."
- "And finally, I am not in the entertainment business."

== On-air staff ==
=== Current ===
==== Anchors ====
- Amna Nawaz, co-anchor since January 2, 2023; joined April 6, 2018 as a chief correspondent
- Geoff Bennett, co-anchor since January 2, 2023; previously anchor of weekend broadcast beginning April 2, 2022; joined January 3, 2022 as chief Washington correspondent
- Nick Schifrin – foreign affairs and defense correspondent and substitute anchor (joined September 1, 2015)
- William Brangham – correspondent/producer and occasional substitute anchor for the weekday and weekend program (joined August 10, 2012)

==== Correspondents ====
- Malcolm Brabant – special correspondent, especially reporting from Europe, based in Denmark (joined June 15, 2015)
- Marcia Biggs - special correspondent, Middle East (joined December 8, 2014)
- Jeffrey Brown – chief correspondent for arts, culture, society, and substitute weekday anchor since December 23, 1998; joined as an off-camera journalist in 1988
- Tom Casciato - special correspondent (joined December 15, 2018)
- Fred de Sam Lazaro – correspondent and contributor to the Agents For Change series (joined October 1, 1985)
- Stephanie Sy, anchor of PBS News Hour West from October 14, 2019 to December 19, 2025; contributing correspondent; and substitute weekend anchor (joined July 29, 2019)
- Lisa Desjardins – political correspondent substitute weekend anchor (joined October 29, 2014)
- Michael Hill – substitute weekend anchor (joined in April 7, 2020)
- Liz Landers – White House Correspondent (joined September 16, 2025)
- Miles O'Brien – science and aviation correspondent, substitute anchor (joined October 5, 2010)
- Ali Rogin - weekend correspondent (joined March 14, 2019)
- Paul Solman – business, economics and occasional art correspondent, creator of Making Sen$e (joined June 30, 1985)
- Megan Thompson – substitute weekend anchor and special correspondent (joined June 2013)
- Judy Woodruff – senior correspondent and former weekday anchor (joined September 5, 1983 – June 24, 1993; joined CNN Group and returned to PBS on April 12, 2006; stepped down as main anchor on December 30, 2022)
- Deema Zein – correspondent and digital anchor (joined April 9, 2018)

==== Political analysts ====
- David Brooks of The Atlantic (Fridays; joined September 21, 2001)
- Jonathan Capehart of MS NOW (Fridays; joined January 8, 2021)
- Tamara Keith of NPR (Mondays; joined November 1, 2012)
- Amy Walter of The Cook Political Report (Mondays and election night; joined July 29, 2004)
- E. J. Dionne of The Washington Post (substitute)
- Ruth Marcus of The New Yorker (substitute)
- Matthew Continetti of American Enterprise Institute (substitute; joined February 7, 2025)
- Jasmine Wright of NOTUS (substitute; joined September 23, 2024)
- Gary Abernathy of The Washington Post (substitute)
- Kimberly Atkins Stohr of The Boston Globe (substitute; joined July 29, 2019)
- Marcia Coyle (substitute)

=== Former ===
- John Yang, (December 31, 2022 – January 11, 2026; weekend anchor/March 1, 2016 – March 27, 2026; national correspondent)
- Robert MacNeil – weekday anchor and executive editor (October 20, 1975 – October 20, 1995; died on April 12, 2024)
- Jim Lehrer – weekday anchor and executive editor (December 1, 1975 – June 6, 2011; retired except on Fridays until his last day on December 30, 2011; died on January 23, 2020)
- Charlayne Hunter-Gault – weekday anchor and correspondent (December 8, 1977 – June 13, 1997; retired)
- Elizabeth Farnsworth – weekday anchor and correspondent (December 31, 1984 – February 28, 2005; now an author)
- Susan Dentzer – correspondent (1998 – 2008)
- Tom Bearden – correspondent (March 31, 1985 – July 20, 2012; retired)
- Betty Ann Bowser – correspondent (1986 – 2013; died on March 16, 2018)
- Kwame Holman – correspondent (September 8, 1983 – January 14, 2014; retired)
- John Merrow – correspondent (December 30, 1984 – July 31, 2015; retired)
- Roger Mudd – essayist and political correspondent (1987 – 1993; died on March 9, 2021)
- Margaret Warner – weekday anchor and correspondent (June 24, 1993 – September 7, 2017; now at the Council of Foreign Relations)
- Spencer Michels – correspondent (July 19, 1983 – November 2, 2017; retired)
- Gwen Ifill – Monday-Thursday anchor (also a Senior Correspondent) (October 4, 1999 – November 14, 2016; died from endometrial cancer)
- Ray Suarez – weekday anchor and correspondent (October 4, 1999 – October 25, 2013; moved to Al Jazeera America, and left NewsHour after the launch of 2013's NewsHour with Gwen Ifill and Judy Woodruff)
- Terence Smith – weekday anchor and special correspondent (August 17, 1998 – November 23, 2005; retired)
- Yamiche Alcindor – White House correspondent (January 16, 2018 – January 7, 2022; moved to NBC News)
- Mike Taibbi – special weekend correspondent and substitute weekend anchor (April 11, 2015 – June 29, 2020; retired)
- Daniel Bush – senior digital political reporter on air during election night coverage (November 30, 2015 – June 22, 2021; now a White House Correspondent at Newsweek)
- Alison Stewart – substitute weekend anchor (2012 – 2020; now at WNYC Public Radio)
- Hari Sreenivasan – special correspondent and former substitute anchor and weekend anchor (December 7, 2009 – November 7, 2023)
- Laura Barrón-López – White House correspondent and substitute weekend anchor (June 16, 2022 – July 18, 2025; now at MS NOW)

==== Political analysts ====
- David Gergen (Fridays; March 30, 1981 – March 18, 1994; died on July 10, 2025, from lewy body dementia)
- Michael Gerson of The Washington Post (substitute; died on November 17, 2022, from parkinson's disease)
- Paul Gigot (Fridays; March 25, 1994 – September 14, 2001)
- Stuart Rothenberg of Inside Elections (substitute; October 30, 1992 – March 11, 2019)
- Susan Page of USA Today (substitute; June 6, 2012 – March 25, 2024)
- Karen Tumulty of The Washington Post (substitute)
- Jeff Greenfield (Weekends; July 29, 2018 – January 30, 2022)
- Mark Shields as a syndicated columnist (Fridays; November 11, 1988 – December 18, 2020; died on June 18, 2022, from kidney failure)

== Criticism and reception ==
=== Critical response ===
PBS News Hour has received generally positive reviews from television critics, children. Patrick Kevin Day of the Los Angeles Times wrote, "Gwen Ifill and Judy Woodruff are making history on PBS." David Leonard and Micah Schwalb of The Denver Post wrote, "One of the most trusted news programs on television." Phil Owen of TheWrap wrote, "The least partisan analysis." Tim Surette of TV Guide wrote, "The calm and credible information we need." Jennifer Gerson of The 19th wrote, "Nawaz is stepping into history."

In 2003, UCLA political scientist Tim Groseclose and Missouri economist Jeff Milyo evaluated various media programs based on "think tank" citations to map liberal versus conservative media slants and published a study alleging liberal media bias in general. Based on their research, PBS News Hour is the most centrist news program on television and the closest to a truly objective stance. However, their methodology has been questioned.

=== FAIR study ===
In October 2006, the media criticism group Fairness & Accuracy in Reporting (FAIR) accused the PBS News Hour of lacking balance, diversity, and viewpoints of the general public, and for presenting corporate viewpoints. FAIR found that the PBS News Hour's guest list from October 2005 to March 2006 had Republicans outnumbering Democrats 2–1, and minorities accounting for 15 percent of U.S.-based sources. FAIR also protested in 1995 when Liberty Media purchased a majority of the program, citing Liberty's majority owner, John Malone, for his "Machiavellian business tactics" and right-wing sentiments.

News Hour executive producer Linda Winslow responded to many aspects:

FAIR seems to be accusing us of covering the people who make decisions that affect people's lives, many of whom work in government, the military, or corporate America. That's what we do: we're a news program, and that's who makes news... I take issue with the way the FAIR report characterizes each guest, which they have obviously done very subjectively. Witness the trashing of Mark Shields and Tom Oliphant (in the full report), who are not liberal enough for FAIR's taste. When you get down to arguing about degrees of left-and-rightness, I think you undermine your own argument.

She also accused FAIR of counting sound bites as interviews, thereby skewing their numbers toward the political party holding a majority (at the time of FAIR's report, Republican Party).

== Partnership with NPR ==
The PBS News Hour partnered with NPR for the broadcast of the Republican and Democratic National Conventions of 2016, in a strategy to prepare for the election between Donald Trump and Hillary Clinton.

== See also ==
- Institute for Nonprofit News (PBS News Hour is a member)
