= Nick Schifrin =

American journalist (born 1980)

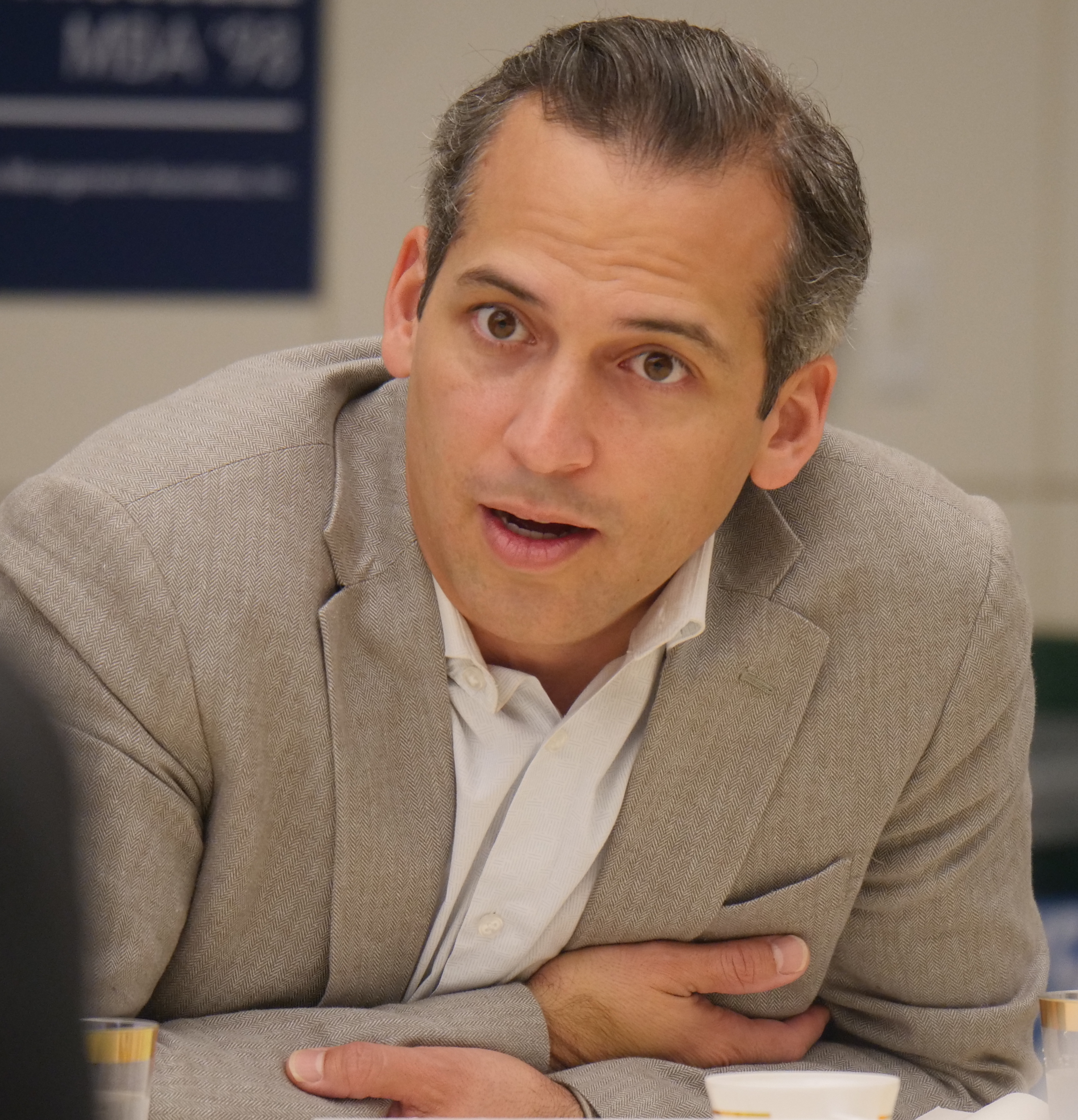
- Schifrin in 2019
- Born: July 10, 1980 (age 46)
- Education: Columbia University (BA)
- Occupation: Journalist

Nick Schifrin (born July 10, 1980) is an American television journalist. Schifrin is the PBS NewsHour's foreign affairs and defense correspondent, and is the host of the weekly program Compass Points From PBS News.

He was previously Al Jazeera America's Middle East correspondent in Jerusalem and a correspondent for ABC News in London and in Afghanistan/Pakistan.

== Early life and education ==
Schifrin grew up in Los Angeles, California. He graduated from Columbia University. During his time at Columbia, Schifrin served as managing editor of the Columbia Daily Spectator. He later earned a Master of International Public Policy degree from the Johns Hopkins University Paul H. Nitze School of Advanced International Studies (SAIS) in 2018.

== ABC News ==
In 2002 Schifrin joined ABC News as an overnight desk assistant.

In 2006, Schifrin helped launch the daily World News Webcast, the first network show designed for the web and iTunes. He served as the show's writer and broadcast producer. In its review of the webcast, The New York Times called the show's stories "raw and personal, as if they were made for MTV rather than ABC".

In 2007, Schifrin moved to New Delhi, India, where he served as an ABC News reporter. There, he interviewed the Dalai Lama during the 2008 Tibetan unrest, and won a Business Emmy as part of a team covering the worldwide food crisis. Schifrin was also one of the first international reporters to arrive on the scene following the November 2008 Mumbai attacks.

In 2008, Schifrin became the ABC News Afghanistan/Pakistan correspondent and bureau chief. Schifrin was one of the first journalists to arrive in Abbottabad, Pakistan after Osama bin Laden's death in 2011, delivering one of biggest exclusives of the year: the first video from inside bin Laden's compound. His reporting helped ABC News win an Edward R. Murrow Award for its bin Laden coverage.

In 2012, Schifrin moved to London, reporting on breaking news and feature stories across Europe and northern Africa.

== Al Jazeera America ==
In November 2013, Schifrin became Al Jazeera America's first foreign correspondent. He was based in Jerusalem and primarily covered the Middle East.

In early 2014, Schifrin arrived in Ukraine as violence peaked in Kyiv. He spent more than a month in Ukraine, including Crimea, as Ukraine's pro-Russian government fell and Russia annexed Crimea. He and his team won a National Headliners Award for their coverage.

In the summer of 2014, Schifrin led the channel's coverage of the war in Gaza. During this time he filed more than 50 stories from Gaza and Israel during the war, and anchored an hour-long special from Gaza City, reporting from inside Gaza longer than almost any other foreign journalist. Schifrin and his team won the Overseas Press Club's David Kaplan Award for their coverage of the war from both sides of the border.

== PBS NewsHour ==
Schifrin was named PBS NewsHour's foreign affairs and defense correspondent in May 2018. Beginning in late 2015, Schifrin was a PBS NewsHour special correspondent, creating week-long series: "Inside Putin's Russia"; NATO and Ukraine "Fault Lines"; "Nigeria: Pain and Promise"; "Egypt 5 Years On." Inside Putin's Russia won a 2017 Peabody Award and the 2018 National Press Club's Edwin M. Hood Award for Diplomatic Correspondence-broadcast. After the 10-part series "China: Power and Prosperity" in September 2019 and the "China: Power and Prosperity" documentary in July 2020, Schifrin received the American Academy of Diplomacy's Arthur Ross Media Award. Schifrin was part of the teams of correspondents and producers awarded a 2021 Peabody for coverage of the COVID-19 pandemic, a 2023 duPont-Columbia Award for coverage of the fall of Afghanistan and the full scale invasion of Ukraine, and the 2023 National Press Club Edwin M. Hood Award for Diplomatic Correspondence - Broadcast for Ukraine.

== Writings ==
In 2011, Schifrin wrote an essay titled "Reading Shakespeare In Kandahar", which was published in Foreign Policy magazine. The essay tells about Schifrin's personal journey from his college lecture classroom in New York City, where he was on the day of the September 11 attacks in 2001, to Osama bin Laden's lair in Pakistan ten years later.

In his class a decade prior, Schifrin's Shakespeare professor had given an emotional speech about the 9/11 attacks and Shakespeare's play Titus Andronicus, with its theme of the desire for revenge. The essay touches on the United States's failure to heed Shakespeare's warnings about how the pursuit of revenge can become destructive. Schifrin and his Columbia University professor, David Kastan, appeared on the Charlie Rose show on PBS to discuss the essay.

== Awards ==
- National Press Club's Edwin M. Hood Award for Diplomatic Correspondence - Broadcast: The War in Ukraine, July 2023 (shared with multiple teams)
- DuPont-Columbia Award: The Fall of Afghanistan & Coverage of the War in Ukraine, Feb. 2023 (shared with multiple teams)
- Peabody Award: Coverage of the COVID-19 pandemic, June 2021 (shared with multiple teams)
- American Academy of Diplomacy's Arthur Ross Media Award, November 2020
- National Press Club's Edwin M. Hood Award for Diplomatic Correspondence-broadcast, July 2018
- Peabody Award: Inside Putin's Russia, May 2018
- Overseas Press Club's David Kaplan Award for "Conflict in Gaza", May 2015
- The Press Club of Atlantic City's National Headliners Award for "Coverage of Ukraine", March 2015
- Radio Television Digital News Association's Edward R. Murrow Award: Video Breaking News Coverage for "Target bin Laden: The Death of Public Enemy #1", March 2012
- Emmy Award: News & Documentary for Outstanding Live Coverage of a Current News Story – Long Form, December 2008
