= William Brangham =

American journalist (born 1968)

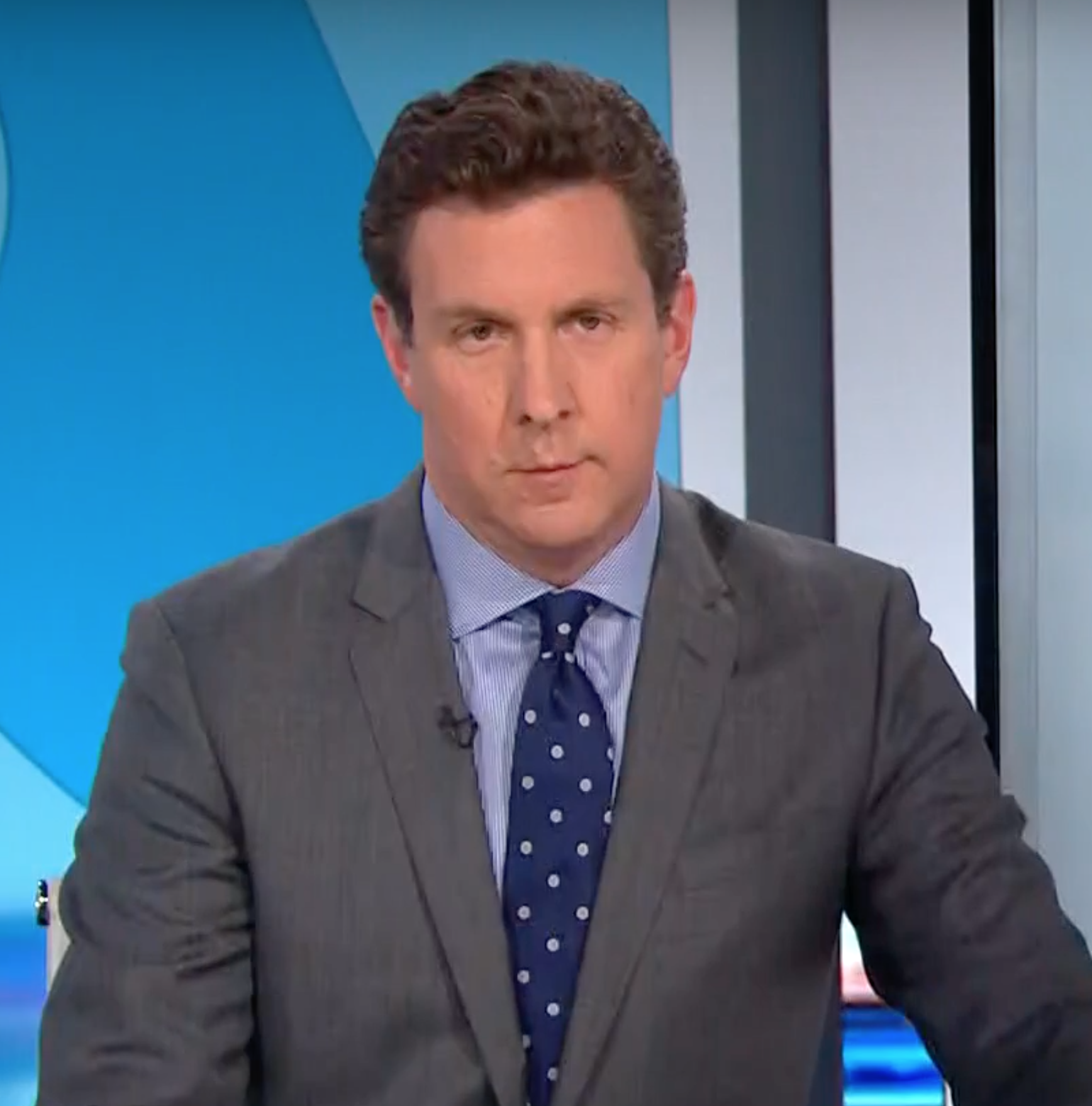
- Brangham while anchoring the PBS NewsHour on January 3, 2018
- Born: 1968 (age 57–58)
- Education: Colorado College (BA)
- Occupations: Journalist; Producer
- Years active: 1990s—present
- Spouse: Tory Brangham
- Children: 3

William Brangham (born 1968) is an American journalist who is a correspondent, producer, and substitute anchor for the PBS NewsHour. He also hosts the weekly science series "Horizons on PBS." Earlier he worked as a producer for several other television programs, mostly for PBS. He has won three Peabody Awards (in 2015, 2022, and 2025) and three News & Documentary Emmy Awards (in 2017, 2019, and 2020).

== Education and career ==
Brangham studied English language and literature at Colorado College between 1986 and 1990, graduating with a Bachelor of Arts. He started his career as a research assistant and field producer for a number of Bill Moyers documentaries in the late 1990s and early 2000s. Those included Listening to America with Bill Moyers, Close to Home: Moyers on Addiction, and On Our Own Terms: Moyers on Dying in America. Brangham also worked on documentary films and projects for ABC News, National Geographic's Explorer series, several documentaries for PBS's Frontline series(1995/1996), and The New York Times documentary series Science Times (2001).

After 9/11, Brangham re-joined Moyers' production company for the PBS newsmagazine Now, where he shot, wrote, and produced dozens of broadcast stories and interviews over a period of six years. After that, he was a producer on Bill Moyers Journal, when it was revived in 2007, and in 2010 joined the PBS magazine show Need to Know. Brangham was a producer, cameraman, and occasional correspondent on Need to Know for its entire run. Separately, he taught as an adjunct professor at the Columbia University Graduate School of Journalism for a year.

In 2013, Brangham joined the weekend edition of PBS NewsHour in New York City as a producer, correspondent, and occasional substitute anchor. After two years, he become a correspondent for the PBS NewsHour in Washington, D.C., reporting on general events, conducting studio interviews, and occasionally filling in as anchor of the program.

Brangham's reporting on the Syrian refugee crisis in Europe was among the programs cited for the NewsHour's 2015 Peabody Award.

In 2017, PBS NewsHour's six-part series "The End of AIDS?", of which Brangham was the correspondent, won a News & Documentary Emmy Award in the category "Outstanding Science, Medical and Environmental Report". That series also received several other awards, including the National Academies Communication Award in the category "Film/Radio/TV".

In 2018, Brangham worked with several NewsHour colleagues on an investigation into rape, harassment, and retaliation within the U.S. Forest Service. That broadcast and online series, "On the Fire Line," prompted changes in how the Forest Service reports and investigates assault and harassment allegations and led to the immediate resignation of the Chief of the U.S. Forest Service. This reporting won a 2019 News & Documentary Emmy Award for "Outstanding Investigative Report in a Newscast", won a Webby Award, was nominated for a Peabody, and won the 2018 Al Neuharth Innovation in Investigative Journalism Award.

In 2019, Brangham and his NewsHour colleagues produced a three-part series called "Stopping a Killer Pandemic" which looked at U.S. preparations for a flu pandemic. That series won a 2020 News & Documentary Emmy Award for "Outstanding Science, Medical and Environmental Report." (Brangham's and his colleague's multi-part series about climate change in Antarctica, "Warnings from Antarctica", was also nominated for an Emmy in that same category, and became the NewsHour's first originally-produced podcast series, "The Last Continent".)

Brangham was part of the NewsHour team that won a 2022 Peabody Award for its coverage of guns and gun violence in America. His reporting that year culminated in the NewsHour documentary, “Ricochet: An American Trauma.”

Brangham's reporting on the Trump Administration's immigration crackdown was among the stories that helped the News Hour win a 2025 Peabody Award, which was cited for "its sweeping, authoritative, and balanced coverage of one of the most divisive issues of our time."

== Personal life ==
Brangham is married. His wife is Tory, and they have two sons and one daughter. He lives in the Washington, D.C. area.

== Accolades ==
Year	Award	Category	Nominee(s)	Result	Ref.
2022	Peabody Awards	News	Guns in America	Won	

== See also ==
- PBS NewsHour
