= Amna Nawaz =

American journalist

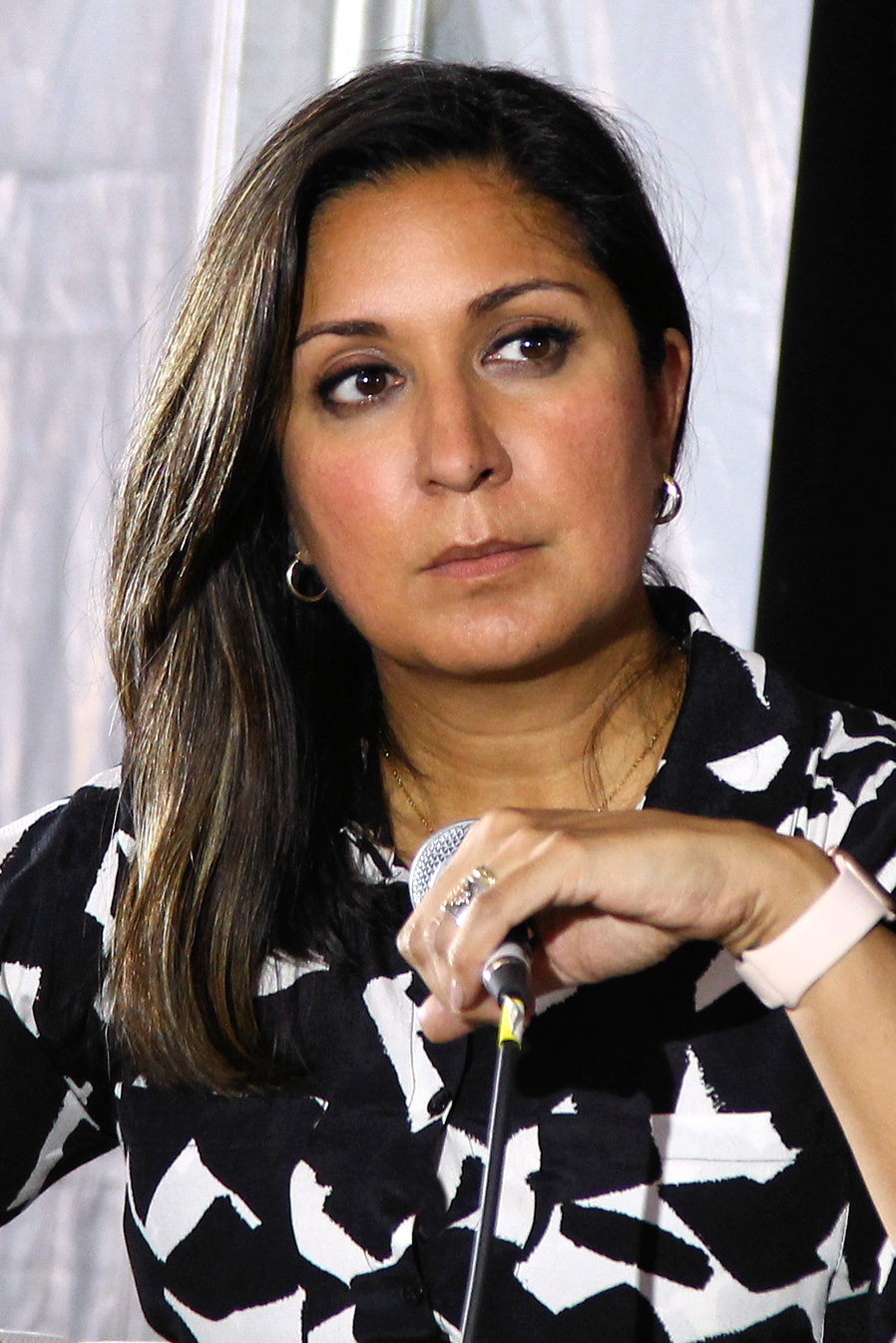
- Nawaz in 2022
- Born: September 18, 1979 (age 47); Virginia, U.S.
- Education: University of Pennsylvania (BA); London School of Economics (MS)
- Occupations: Broadcast journalist; anchor; reporter; foreign correspondent
- Employers: PBS News Hour; NBC News; Washington Week
- Spouse: Paul Werdel (m. 2007)
- Children: 2
- Relatives: Asif Nawaz Janjua (uncle)

Amna Nawaz is an American broadcast journalist and a co-anchor of the PBS NewsHour alongside Geoff Bennett. Before joining PBS in April 2018, Nawaz was an anchor and correspondent at ABC News and NBC News. She has received a number of awards, including an Emmy Award and a Society for Features Journalism award.

== Early life ==
Nawaz was born in Virginia on September 18, 1979, to Pakistani parents. Her father, Shuja Nawaz (brother of former Pakistani Army chief Asif Nawaz Janjua), had been a journalist in Pakistan. She attended Thomas Jefferson High School for Science and Technology in Fairfax County, Virginia. In 2001, she earned a bachelor's degree from the University of Pennsylvania in politics, philosophy, and economics, where she co-captained the women's varsity field hockey team. She holds a master's degree in comparative politics from the London School of Economics.

== Career ==
Nawaz's career plan was to become a lawyer but after a fellowship at ABC News, she shifted to journalism. She initially worked for Nightline.

Nawaz joined NBC in 2003, later joining Dateline NBC, where she worked on documentaries. At NBC's investigative unit, she was a producer of Mortgage Crisis Investigations, which was nominated for the 2008 Emmy Awards for Business & Financial Reporting.

Nawaz received an International Reporting Project fellowship in 2009. In 2010, she shared a News & Documentary Emmy Award for the NBC News special Inside the Obama White House. Later she was correspondent and bureau chief at NBC's Islamabad bureau.

Nawaz joined ABC News in 2015. She anchored U.S. election and national political coverage in 2016 and 2017. Nawaz also hosted the ABC podcast series Uncomfortable. She joined PBS in April 2018.

Nawaz contributed as a correspondent on the PBS News Hour's 2018 series The Plastic Problem, which received a Peabody Award in 2019.

In December 2019, Nawaz became the first Asian American to moderate a United States presidential debate when she co-moderated a Democratic Party presidential debate.

In June 2021, Nawaz became the PBS News Hour's Chief Correspondent.

Nawaz and Geoff Bennett have been co-anchors of the PBS News Hour since January 2023, when they replaced Judy Woodruff.

Nawaz is also a member of the Inter-American Dialogue, a Washington, District of Columbia-based think tank.

In March 2025, she and Bennett were named as co-managing editors of PBS News Hour.

== Awards ==
- News & Documentary Emmy Award for Outstanding Writing
- Society for Features Journalism award
- 2022 Peabody Award for her reporting on the mass shooting in Uvalde, Texas.

Media offices
Preceded by Judy Woodruff	PBS NewsHour anchor With: Geoff Bennett	Succeeded by Incumbent
