= Black Public Media =

Black Public Media is an American public media nonprofit, founded in 1979, initially as the National Black Programming Consortium. It is one of the five National Multicultural Alliance organizations that partnered with the Corporation for Public Broadcasting until its dissolution on January 5, 2026, and frequently partners with the PBS network.

== Notable television programs ==
- AfroPoP
- Africans in America
- Matters of Race
- The Katrina Project
- State of Black America (co-produced with the National Urban League)
