= List of Washington Journal programs aired in January 1995 =

The C-SPAN news and interview program Washington Journal has been presented live every day of the year from January 4, 1995, through the present, with very few exceptions. Programs are typically a mix of politically themed interviews, viewer calls and emails, discussion of current events, and reviews of that morning's newspapers.

In the table below, guests are listed in alphabetical order, rather than the order in which they appeared on the program. They are also listed with the position or affiliation they held at the time of their appearance.

== Table of programs ==
Date (w/link to video)	Approx. run time	Host(s)	Guests	Comments and summary
Wednesday, January 4, 1995	5 hr. 1 min.	Brian Lamb; Susan Swain	Jeffrey Biggs (Press Secretary to Rep. Tom Foley, D-WA); Sen. Tom Daschle (D-SD); Sen. Bob Dole (R-KS); Bradley Edwards (General Manager, Renaissance Hotel); Rep. Barney Frank (D-MA); Rep. Richard Gephardt (D-MO); Brian Naylor (Correspondent, National Public Radio); Robert Okun (Executive Director, House Republican Conference); Rep. Christopher Shays (R-CT); Paul Weyrich (President, National Empowerment Television)	This program was the first Washington Journal program, and focused on the opening day of the 104th United States Congress and the Republican Revolution. "The tentative schedule of the day’s legislative events was given. Mr. Naylor discussed the agenda for the first day of the 104th Congress. In the newspaper roundtable, Mr. Weyrich and Rep. Frank reviewed the top stories. Sen. Dole, Sen. Daschle, Rep. Gephardt discussed the goals of their respective parties for the first days of the 104th Congress. Rep. Shays explained the Congressional Accountability Bill. In the final segment, Mr. Okun and Mr. Biggs discussed the transition of power in the 104th Congress, including the ceremonies involved with the opening of Congress."
Thursday, January 5, 1995	2 hr. 58 min.	Susan Swain; Connie Doebele	Robert F. Bauer (General Counsel, Democratic Congressional Campaign Committee); James H. Billington (Librarian of Congress); Tim Burger (Correspondent, CQ Today); Rep. Bob Inglis (R-SC); Celinda Lake (Political Consultant, Democratic Party); Robert D. Novak (Anchor, CNN); Paul Starobin (Correspondent, National Journal)	"Mr. Burger reviewed the opening session of the 104th Congress and the legislative agenda for the Congress. In the newspaper roundtable, Mr. Novak and Ms. Lake reviewed the top stories. Mr. Starobin reviewed his article on Republican majority leader Armey in the National Journal. Mr. Billington discussed the 'THOMAS', the new electronic information system about the Congress. Rep. Inglis and Mr. Bauer offered opposing viewpoints on the issue of term limits. The program contains technical difficulties with the video within the first hour."
Friday, January 6, 1995	2 hr.	Brian Lamb	Larry Bensky (Talk Show Host, Pacifica Radio); Ralph Z. Hallow (Correspondent, Washington Times); Jesse Jackson (Founder, National Rainbow Coalition); Wes Minter (Correspondent, WCCO Radio, Minneapolis); Deborah Orin (Correspondent, New York Post); Michael Reagan (Talk Show Host, American Entertainment Network); Gov. William F. Weld (R-MA)	"Ms. Orin discussed the relationship between the Democratic party and the Republican party, including the meeting of President Clinton with Rep. Gingrich and Senator Dole. In the newspaper roundtable, Mr. Reagan and Mr. Bensky reviewed the top stories. Mr. Minter discussed the opening day of Congress, which he spent broadcasting from Rep. Newt Gingrich's office. Mr. Hallow explained the Republican campaign to gain public support for the Balanced Budget Amendment. Rev. Jackson expressed his concerns about the Republican 'Contract With America'. In the final segment, Governor Weld explained the issue of unfunded federal mandates and the impact of the Balanced Budget Amendment."
Sunday, January 8, 1995	1 hr. 28 min.	Steve Scully	Haley Barbour (Chairman, Republican National Committee); Kathy Bushkin (Editorial Director, U.S. News & World Report); Rep. George Nethercutt (R-WA)	"Interviews, video clips and vignettes illustrated the political issues and events of the previous week, including the opening of the 104th Congress and the situation in the Russian province of Chechnya."
Monday, January 9, 1995	2 hr. 15 min.		Laurence Barrett (Correspondent, Time Magazine, Washington Bureau); Rep. Jim Bunning (R-KY); Hendrik Hertzberg (executive editor, The New Yorker); John Leo (Editor, U.S. News & World Report); Steven McGonigle (Correspondent, Dallas Morning News)	"Mr. Leo and Mr. Hertzberg discussed the morning newspaper top stories. Mr. McGonigle previewed the U.S. Supreme Court winter session opening today. Rep. Bunning, chairman of the House Ways and Means Social Security Subcommittee, talked about a hearing today on the Social Security earnings limit."
Tuesday, January 10, 1995	2 hr. 30 min.	Lew Ketcham	Michael Boskin (Professor of Economics, Stanford University); Lawrence Chimerine (Spokesman, Economic Strategy Institute); David Hinson (Former Administrator, Federal Aviation Administration); Jeffrey Klein, (editor-in-chief, Mother Jones Magazine); Rep. Donald M. Payne (D-NJ); Gwen Daye Richardson (Editor, National Minority Politics); Andrew Taylor (Correspondent, Congressional Quarterly)	"In the first segment, Mr. Taylor discussed the balanced budget amendment. Mr. Hinson reviewed a meeting of representatives of U.S. air carriers, aerospace designers and labor organizations concerning airline safety. In the newspaper roundtable, Ms. Richardson and Mr. Klein reviewed the top stories and the stories in their own publications. Rep. Payne, new chairman of the Congressional Black Caucus, discussed the new Congress and its agenda by phone. In the final segment, Mr. Boskin and Mr. Chimerine talked about the process for estimating the federal budget."
Wednesday, January 11, 1995	3 hr. 6 min.	Bruce Collins	David Asman (senior editor, Wall Street Journal); Marian Burros (Correspondent, New York Times); Christopher Hansen (Attorney, American Civil Liberties Union ); Fred Hiatt (Moscow Bureau Chief, Washington Post); Yoshi Komori (Washington Bureau Chief, Sankei Shimbun); Rep. Zoe Lofgren (D-CA); Frank I. Luntz (Political Consultant, Luntz and Associates); Jay Nixon (Attorney General of Missouri)	"Mr. Komori previewed President Clinton's meeting with Japanese Prime Minister Murayama later today, and reviewed the status of U.S.-Japanese relations. In the newspaper roundtable, Mr. Luntz and Rep. Lofgren reviewed top stories and discussed Republican efforts to restructure the role of the federal government. Via telephone, Ms. Burros discussed her Times article on the first lady, which has been criticized for allegedly containing 'off the record' remarks. Mr. Nixon and Mr. Hansen discussed the Supreme Court case of Missouri v. Jenkins, which deals with the issue of school desegregation and the goals of the school desegregation program. Mr. Asman reported on the devaluation of the Mexican peso last week and the prospects of the Mexican economy to rebound. In the final segment, Mr. Hiatt discussed the Russian war in Chechnya and the status of President Yeltsin's control over the Russian government."
Thursday, January 12, 1995	2 hr. 3 min.	Susan Swain	Bob Fuss (Congressional Correspondent, NBC Radio); Rep. Sue Kelly (R-NY); Rep. Lynn Rivers (D-MI)	"Mr. Fuss discussed the legislative activity in Congress, including unfunded mandate legislation, the Balanced Budget Amendment, and congressional responsibility legislation. In the newspaper roundtable, Representatives Rivers and Kelly reviewed top stories and discussed divisions within the Republican party over various aspects of its agenda."
Friday, January 13, 1995	2 hr. 57 min.	Brian Lamb	Jill Abramson (Deputy Washington Bureau Chief, Wall Street Journal; Francis Coombs Jr. (Editor, Washington Times); Kwame Holman (Correspondent, PBS's MacNeil/Lehrer NewsHour); Jeffrey Rosen (Correspondent, The New Republic)	"In the first segment, Mr. Holman talked about how the furious congressional activity would affect ordinary citizens and the struggle over the Republican agenda. He also talked about the race for the Republican presidential nomination. In the newspaper roundtable, Ms. Abramson and Mr. Coombs reviewed top stories and discussed Democratic reorganization efforts and the status of loan guarantees for Mexico. In the next segment, Senators Bradley and Gramm talked about the prospects for the Balanced Budget Amendment, one of the key parts of the Republican Contract. In the final segment, Mr. Rosen talked about his article about the controversy over immigration in the latest issue of New Republic, which focuses on the legal questions surrounding the struggle over immigration in the United States."
Sunday, January 15, 1995	1 hr. 30 min.	Lew Ketcham	Norman Atkins (Correspondent, New York Times); Gov. Parris Glendening (D-MD); Tom Rosenstiel (Correspondent, Los Angeles Times); Armstrong Williams (Talk Show Host, WOL-AM and WMMJ-FM); Juan Williams (Correspondent, Washington Post)	"Mr. Williams and Mr. Williams discussed several topics, including the legacy of Martin Luther King Jr., allegations that Louis Farrakhan was involved in the murder of Malcolm X, and the U.S. policy on the conflict in Chechnya. By telephone, Mr. Rosenstiel talked about his article based on interviews with George Mitchell concerning the Democratic election losses in 1994. By telephone, Mr. Atkins discussed his article about Governor Thompson of Wisconsin and his activities in trying to reform welfare. Newly elected Governor Glendening talked about conditions in Maryland and the relationship between state and federal government."
Monday, January 16, 1995	3 hr.	Connie Doebele	Richard E. Cohen (Congressional Correspondent, National Journal); George E. Curry (publisher and editor, Emerge Magazine); Ronald Kessler (Author); Terry Rockefeller (Producer, Blackside Productions); Flip Schulke (Photographer); Cal Thomas (Columnist, Los Angeles Times)	"Mr. Cohen discussed his article in this week’s National Journal on Newt Gingrich and his coterie. He will also discuss the latest news from Capitol Hill. In the newspaper roundtable, Mr. Thomas and Mr. Curry discussed headlines from various papers across the country. Via telephone, Ms. Rockefeller discussed her documentary on Lyndon Johnson’s War on Poverty entitled America's War on Poverty. Mr. Kessler discussed his book Inside the White House. Via telephone, Mr. Schulke who worked as a freelance photographer during the civil rights movement, talked about Martin Luther King Jr. He became friends with Mr. King and has published a book of photographs that document the era."
Tuesday, January 17, 1995	2 hr. 28 min.	Lew Ketcham	Thomas "Tad" A. Devine (Manager, Kerrey Campaign); Barbara Dudley (Director, Greenpeace USA; Eric Felten (Editorial Writer, Washington Times); Mike Murphy (Political Consultant, Mike Murphy Media); Stuart S. Taylor Jr. (Senior Writer, The American Lawyer); William L. Taylor (Member, Citizens' Commission on Civil Rights)	"Mr. Taylor discussed a case before the Supreme Court today involving reverse discrimination. In the newspaper roundtable, Ms. Dudley and Mr. Felten discussed headlines from various papers across the country. Via telephone, Mr. Taylor discussed the report entitled "New Challenges: The Civil Rights Record of the Clinton Administration". In the final segment, Mr. Devine and Mr. Murphy talked about what makes an effective political advertisement."
Wednesday, January 18, 1995	2 hr. 36 min.	Steve Scully	Martin Corry (Director, American Association of Retired Persons); Arianna S. Huffington (Spokeswoman, National Empowerment Television; Ann Lewis (Vice President, Planned Parenthood Federation of America); Robert Nelson (Co-Founder, Lead... or Leave Campaign); Rep. Bernie Sanders (I-VT)	"In the newspaper roundtable, Ms. Huffington and Ms. Lewis discussed headlines from various papers across the country. Mr. Sanders talked about the Progressive Caucus and the Republican 'Contract With America'. In the final segment, Mr. Corry and Mr. Nelson talked about whether social security should be considered as part of the federal budget process."
Thursday, January 19, 1995	3 hr.	Susan Swain	Rep. Sherrod Brown (D-OH); John King (Correspondent, Associated Press); Rep. Rob Portman (R-OH); Rep. George Radanovich (R-CA); Rep. Bill Thomas (R-CA); Rep. Harold Volkmer (D-MO); Rep. Henry Waxman (D-CA)	"Mr. King talked about the winter meetings for the Republican and Democratic national committees. In the newspaper roundtable, Reps. Brown and Radanovich discussed headlines from various papers across the country. Reps. Brown and Volkmer discussed Wednesday’s situation on the House floor concerning remarks made by Rep. Carrie Meek on House Speaker Newt Gingrich’s book deal. In the final segment, Reps. Portman and Waxman talked about unfunded mandates and the issue of imposing legislative programs on state and local governments without federal funding."
Friday, January 20, 1995	2 hr. 56 min.	Brian Lamb; Connie Doebele	Daniel Franklin (Bureau Chief, The Economist); Rep. Marcy Kaptur (D-OH); Rep. Bill Richardson (D-NM); Walter Shapiro (White House Correspondent, Esquire); Ben Stein (Columnist, The American Spectator); Basil Talbott (Congressional Correspondent, Chicago Sun-Times)	"Mr. Talbott reviewed this week’s activities on Capitol Hill. In the newspaper roundtable, Mr. Shapiro and Mr. Stein discussed headlines from various newspapers across the country. Via telephone, Mr. Franklin talked about a story, that will come out in The Economist tomorrow, on what the president should say in his State of the Union Address. In the final segment, Reps. Kaptur and Richardson discussed U.S. loan guarantees to Mexico."
Sunday, January 22, 1995	1 hr. 30 min.	Steve Scully	Gerry Braun (Correspondent, San Diego Union-Tribune); James "Jay" Carney (White House Correspondent, Time Magazine; John DiStaso (Political Affairs Correspondent, Manchester Union Leader); Mark D. Gearan (Director, U.S. Peace Corps); Joe Johns (Correspondent, NBC Television); Sen. Jon Kyl (R-AZ)	"Topics included Rep. Newt Gingrich’s book deal, the first few weeks of the 104th Congress, and Tuesday’s State of the Union speech."
Monday, January 23, 1995	3 hr.	Connie Doebele	Terry Eastland (Media Affairs Editor, Forbes Magazine; Maureen Malloy (Legislative Assistant, National Right to Life Committee; Susan Page (White House Correspondent, Newsday); Charles Peters (founding editor, Washington Monthly); Nancy Roman (Supreme Court Correspondent, Washington Times); Ann Stone (Chairwoman, Republicans for Choice); Nadine Strossen (President, American Civil Liberties Union)	"In the first segment Ms. Page discussed President Clinton’s preparedness for the State of the Union address tomorrow. In the newspaper roundtable Mr. Eastland and Mr. Peters reviewed the major morning newspaper stories. Ms. Strossen is the author of Defending Pornography: Free Speech, Sex, and the Fight for Women’s Rights."
Tuesday, January 24, 1995	2 hr. 29 min.	Lew Ketcham	Bernard Aronson (International Adviser, Goldman Sachs); Rep. Joe Barton (R-TX); Kay Granger (Mayor of Fort Worth, TX); Clark Judge (Former White House Speech Writer); Rep. Patricia S. Schroeder (D-CO); Gerald F. Seib (National Politics Correspondent, Wall Street Journal); Gov. Christine Todd Whitman (R-NJ)	"Mr. Seib previewed President Clinton’s State of the Union address. Mayor Granger talked about Fort Worth’s economic problems with losing military bases and industries. In the newspaper roundtable, Mr. Aronson and Mr. Judge discussed the headlines and talked about President Clinton’s State of the Union address. During the roundtable, Governor Whitman, who would be responding to President Clinton’s State of the Union address, talked about her speech later that evening. In the next segment, Representatives Barton and Schroeder talked about their opposing perspectives on the Balanced Budget Amendment."
Wednesday, January 25, 1995	2 hr. 59 min.	Bruce Collins	Gov. George Allen (R-VA); Stephen Bell (Managing Director, Washington Office, Salomon Brothers); Neal Boortz (Talk Show Host, WSB-Radio, Atlanta); Sen. Paul Coverdell (R-GA); Gov. Howard Dean (D-VT); Jack Faris (President, National Federation of Independent Business); A. Lee Fritschler (President, Dickinson College); Al From (Founder and CEO, Democratic Leadership Council); Leslie Lenkowsky (President, Hudson Institute); Sen. Richard Lugar (R-IN); Sen. David Pryor (D-AR); Roger Wilkins (History Professor, George Mason University)	"In the newspaper roundtable, Professors Lenkowsky and Wilkins discussed yesterday’s State of the Union address and discussed the headlines in the morning newspapers from around the U.S. In the next segment, Republican Senator Lugar and Democratic Senator Pryor debated aspects of the president’s State of the Union address. Others reacted to the State of the Union address in telephone interviews and a brief live segment of Neal Boortz interviewing Senator Coverdell on a radio talk show. Live shots of President Clinton departing for Kutztown, Pennsylvania were shown occasionally."
Thursday, January 26, 1995	2 hr.	Susan Swain	Marcy Gordon (Congressional Correspondent, Associated Press); Rep. Enid Greene (R-UT); James Risen (Correspondent, Washington Bureau, Los Angeles Times); Stephen Smith (executive editor, Civilization)	"In the first segment Mr. Risen discussed the Balanced Budget Amendment debate and also Federal Reserve Chairman Greenspan’s testimony on interest rates and the economy. In the newspaper roundtable Mr. Smith and Rep. Waldholtz discussed the State of the Union address and the headline stories from various U.S. newspapers. Ms. Gordon discussed demands by Senators Pressler and Faircloth that the Justice Department initiate a criminal investigation into Commerce Secretary Ron Brown’s financial dealings. Ms. Foerstel described the Balanced Budget Amendment legislation which is making its way through Congress."
Friday, January 27, 1995	2 hr. 41 min.	Brian Lamb; Bruce Collins; Steve Scully	Nina Burleigh (Correspondent, Time Magazine); Craig Crawford (Washington Bureau Chief, Orlando Sentinel); Michael Dineen (President, Capitol Hill Club); Henry Friedlander (History Professor, City University of New York); Paul Gigot (Columnist, Wall Street Journal); Brit Hume (Former Washington D.C. Correspondent, ABC News); Carolyn Lochhead (Correspondent, San Francisco Chronicle); Sybil Milton (Historian, U.S. Holocaust Memorial Museum); Todd S. Purdum (Correspondent, New York Times)	"Ms. Burleigh discussed the passage of the Balanced Budget Amendment in the House by a vote of 300 to 132. In the newspaper roundtable, Mr. Hume, Mr. Purdham, Ms. Lochhead, and Mr. Crawford reviewed the top stories. Mr. Dineen talked about the unveiling of President Bush’s portrait at the Capitol Hill Club scheduled for tonight. Mr. Gigot discussed his column on welfare reform. In a taped interview, Dr. Friedlander and Ms. Milton talked about the history of Auschwitz, a Nazi death camp, on the 50th anniversary of its liberation by Russian troops."
Sunday, January 29, 1995	1 hr. 29 min.	Steve Scully	David Bowermaster (associate editor, U.S. News & World Report); Joseph A. Califano Jr. (Founder, Chair and President, National Center on Addiction and Substance Abuse); Gov. Ben Cayetano (D-HI); Sen. Rod Grams (R-MN); Mark Plotkin (Political Analyst, WAMU-FM, Washington, DC); Gov. Thomas "Tom" Ridge (R-PA); Tom Rosenstiel (Correspondent, Newsweek)	"Guests talked about current news topics, including welfare reform, loan guarantees for Mexico and more questions about President Clinton’s past. Governors Ridge and Cayetano talked about state issues, including welfare reform and budgets and taxes."
Monday, January 30, 1995	2 hr. 37 min.	Brian Lamb; Connie Doebele	Gov. Evan Bayh (D-IN); Susan Bayh (First Lady of Indiana); Kevin Phillips (publisher and editor, American Political Report); Richard Sammon (Correspondent, Congressional Quarterly); Gov. Edward T. Schafer (R-ND); Jules Witcover (Correspondent, Baltimore Sun)	"Mr. Sammon talked about the 104th Congress and looked at the progress made on the Republican "Contract with America". In the newspaper roundtable, Mr. Witcover and Mr. Phillips discussed headlines from various papers across the country. In a point-counterpoint discussion, Governors Bayh and Schaefer discussed the Balanced Budget Amendment."
Tuesday, January 31, 1995	2 hr. 30 min.	Lew Ketcham	Rachelle Cohen (Editorial Board, Boston Herald); Gabriel Kahn (Correspondent, CQ Today); Sen. Robert Kerrey (D-NE); Finlay Lewis (Correspondent, Copley News Service); Rep. Charles B. Rangel (D-NY); Tom Sherwood (Correspondent, WRC-TV, Washington, D.C. News 4); Gov. Tommy Thompson (R-WI)	"Mr. Lewis talked about the financial situation in Mexico and the potential for U.S. assistance. In the newspaper roundtable, Ms. Cohen and Mr. Sherwood discussed headlines from various papers across the country. Via telephone, Senator Kerrey talked about what is in the Bipartisan Commission on Entitlement and Tax Reform’s final report. In a point-counterpoint discussion, Rep. Rangel and Governor Thompson discussed welfare reform. Governor Thompson participated via a remote link. Via telephone, Mr. Kahn talked about the scheduling of committee hearings."
