= Alt space =

Nonprofit organization

alt_chicago
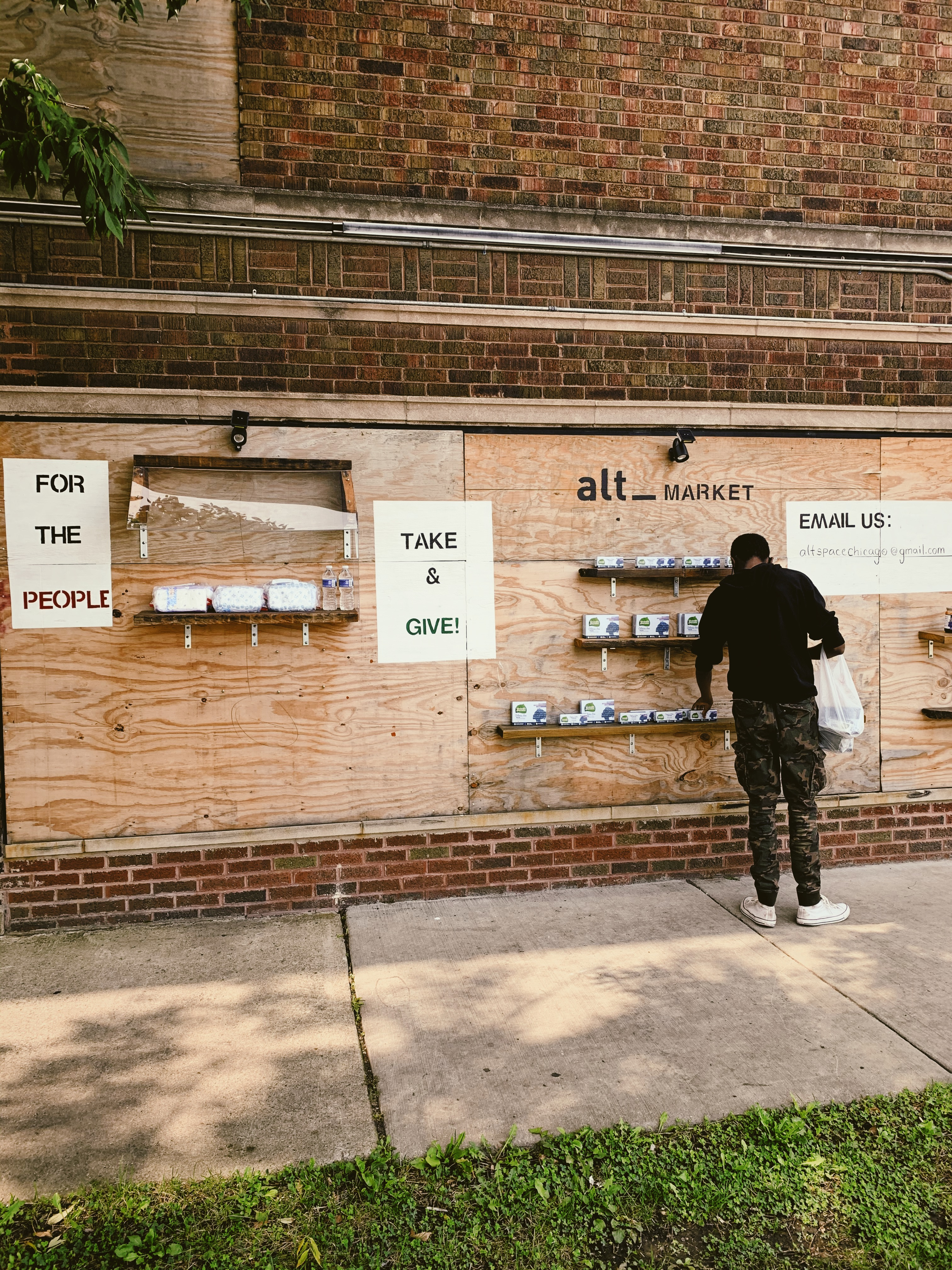
- Nickname: alt_
- Pronunciation: uses "_" to stand for the term "space" or "alternative"
- Formation: Established in 2019
- Founder: Jordan Campbell and Jon Veal
- Type: Nonprofit organization
- Purpose: activism, social change, art, community service
- Location: Chicago, Illinois, United States of America
- Board of directors: Joi Freeman, Christopher Paicely, Norman Teague
- Website: altspacechicago.com

alt_ (styled lowercase, pronounced "alt space") is an artist-led, faith based, 501(c)(3) non-profit organization based in Chicago, Illinois. The organization provides support to communities that have been affected by violence, crime, financial hardships, displacement, or systemic oppression through art and tangible acts of service. The campaigns led by alt_ primarily support communities of color in Chicago's south and west sides. Founded by artists Jon Veal and Jordan Campbell in 2019.

== History ==
alt_ was established in 2019 by Jon Veal and Jordan Campbell in Chicago, Illinois. The goals of the organization aimed to use artistic methods and projects to support Chicago's vulnerable black and brown communities. alt_'s first project was Project Stamp which was launched in 2019. On August 23, 2020, alt_ launched their monthly community clean up event titled "Sunday Service". In the spring of 2020, the organization partnered with the Chicago Park District's TRACE (Teens Re-imagining Art, Community, & Environment) Program to teach artists. In June 2020, they created a functional art installation called "alt_market", located in the Chicago neighborhood of Austin. Following the success of the first market, they opened a second installment on July 15, 2020 in the Chicago neighborhood of Greater Grand Crossings. The Chicago based alternative art space is the recipient of a 2020 Field Foundation Operational grant and the Art Works Fund Winter 2021 "Think" grant.

== Mission ==
The mission is to positively change neighborhoods utilizing art and culture as tools. The organization also considers themselves faith based and uses their faith for guidance in the work that they do. alt_ strives for their art and service events to result in concrete and measurable change for their communities.

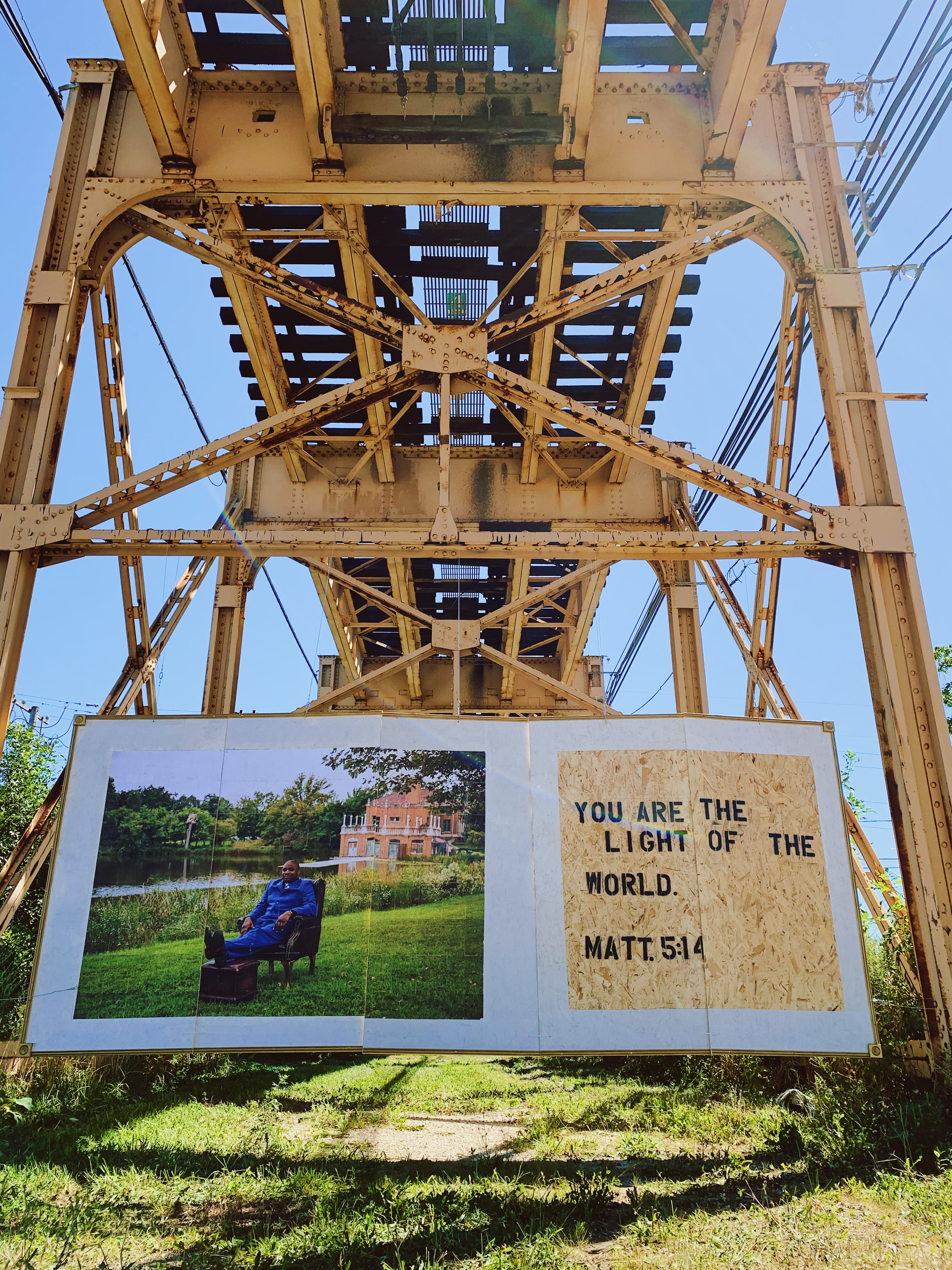

== Projects ==
- alt_ Chicago's “Project Stamp” aimed for public beautification of the community through offering to take free portraits of the Austin community residents. In 2019, Free Family Picture Day was initiated. Free Family Picture Day occurred on the following dates: November 2, 2019 (Austin Town Hall), September 13, 2019 (Hubbard Park), September 14, 2019 (Glenn Art Farm), September 15, 2019 (Columbus Park Refectory). During the event, portrait subjects were seated on antique chairs in public parks and were painted in large-scale prints in effort to create a representative image of the members in the Austin community.
- “Sunday Service” is a once a month volunteer initiative. Volunteers meet on the last Sunday of every month. Its goals aimed to beautify the Austin community by cleaning up visible trash and teaching community members on how to use visual literacy and low-fi materials to re-imagine the community. The first “Sunday Service” occurred on February 23, 2020 at Austin Town Hall.
- “alt_market” is a functional art installation that is aimed to transform abandoned spaces into a safe communal free market for community members to donate and share food resources amongst one another. It was created as a response to the looting within vulnerable communities after the murders of George Floyd and Ahmaud Arbery, and the shooting of Breonna Taylor. On June 19, 2020, alt space partnered with the Grocery Run Club Chicago to build the first installation of "alt market" in the Chicago neighborhood of Austin. In July 2020, “the Rebuild Foundation partnered with alt_ to install and regularly stock a pop-up market at a vacant storefront on the block of Art bank”, in Greater Grand Crossings, Chicago . In August 2020, another “alt_market” was built Englewood, Chicago and in Back of the yards

== Partnerships ==
=== Goodman Theatre ===
alt_ Chicago sponsored the work of E. Faye Butler acting on “Fannie Lou Hamer, Speak on it!”. The piece was inspired by Hamer's work as a civil activist and his work on voting rights. The sponsored piece was set to run from September 17- October 8, 2020.

=== Hyde Park Art Center ===
alt_ Chicago was involved in one of their virtual talks called "Support and Amplify- the Role of Community-based Art Centers in the Age of Pandemic and Social Change". Hyde Park Art Center was a center created as a gathering and production space for artists.

=== Grocery Run Club Chicago ===
The Grocery Run Club (GRC) partnered with alt_ Chicago to bring produce and everyday necessities to neighborhoods all throughout Chicago. The GRC helped run “Alt_ Market” shop. An art installation was created from an abandoned building near the Austin Town Hall, and became a center where people can get free food. This collaboration offered a subscription where people can donate $10 or more a month to help the organization provide more food for families.

=== Austin Coming Together ===
Austin Coming Together is a community organization set to provide housing assistance for Chicago's West Side that paired with alt_ in June 2020. The organization also partnered with alt_'s “Project Stamp” in October 2019. The campaign took more than 100 portraits at well-recognized locations in the Austin area such as GlennArt Farm, and Columbus Park Refectory.

=== Chicago Park District TRACE Program ===
Spring of 2020, alt_ teamed with the TRACE program to help educate people about their environment and how it affects them. TRACE (Teens Re-imagining Art, Community, and Environment) also educates residents about photography and how to look at their communities through a different lens. alt_ and TRACE teamed up to do the same for West Chicago residents.

=== Rebuild Foundation ===
The Rebuild Foundation sponsored the alt_ pop-up market. The Rebuild Foundation rebuilds cultural foundations in underinvested neighborhoods. The two organizations decided to come together to build a pop-up store at an old convenience store, in the Southside of Chicago.

=== NIKE ===
In October 2020, Nike Chicago, Chicago Votes and alt_ teamed up to register the people of the west and south sides to vote using the alt_ market as a community hub. Within twelve days they were able to successfully register over five hundred people.

=== R.A.G.E ===
Since August 8 after we collaborated with the Englewood Arts Collective, Made in Englewood, We All Live Here and Alt_ Chicago and others to transform an abandoned store on 66th & Halsted, our association has been providing items and non-perishable food to the newly created – Englewood Alt_Market
