= YSB (magazine) =

African-American lifestyle magazine, subsidiary of BET (1991–1996)

- Categories: lifestyle magazine
- Frequency: monthly
- Format: print
- Publisher: Paige Publications
- Founder: Robert L. Johnson
- First issue: September 1991
- Final issue: October 1996
- Company: BET
- Country: United States
- Based in: 3109 M Street NW, Washington, D.C.
- Language: English
- ISSN: 1056-6198

YSB, an acronym for Young Sisters and Brothers, was an African American monthly lifestyle magazine, in print publication from 1991 until 1996. The magazine was founded by Robert L. Johnson as a subsidiary of BET. It was the first national African American lifestyle magazine specifically for teenagers age 13 to 19. It was designed to build teenagers self-esteem, and marketed for the "hip-hop generation".

== History ==
YSB debuted the first issue in September 1991. The magazine offered news stories on music, fashion, as well as then-current issues facing teens including substance abuse and HIV/AIDS. BET's publishing division also published Emerge magazine, BET Weekend, and Heart & Soul magazine. Contributors to the magazine included Kenji Jasper (journalist), Jelani Cobb (journalist), Frank Dexter Brown (editor), Fo Wilson (also known as Folayemi Wilson; creative director), and Lance Pettiford (creative director).

Shortly before the last issue in October 1996, BET and Microsoft joined efforts to publish the print magazine online, and at the time only 11% of African American households had access to the internet at home (compared to 29% of white households at this same time). The magazine had been operating at an annual loss of almost $2 million prior to closure.

== See also ==
- Essence (magazine), an earlier African American monthly lifestyle magazine for adults
