= Yo mama (disambiguation) =

A "yo mama" joke is a form of humor involving a verbal disparaging of one's mother.

Yo mama may also refer to:

- Yo Momma (TV series), a 2006 American TV show based upon insulting one's mother
- "Yo' Mama", a song by Frank Zappa from his 1979 album Sheik Yerbouti

== See also ==
- "Ur Mum", a 2022 song by Wet Leg
- "Ya Mama", a 2001 song by Fatboy Slim
- Yo Mama's Last Supper, a 1996 work of art by Jamaican-American artist Renee Cox
- Yo' Mama's DisFunktional!: Fighting the Culture Wars in Urban America, a 1997 book by American historian Robin Kelley
- Yo-Yo Ma, cello player DW referred to as "Yo Mama" on the show Arthur episode "My Music Rules"
