= Renee Cox =

American photographer (born 1960)

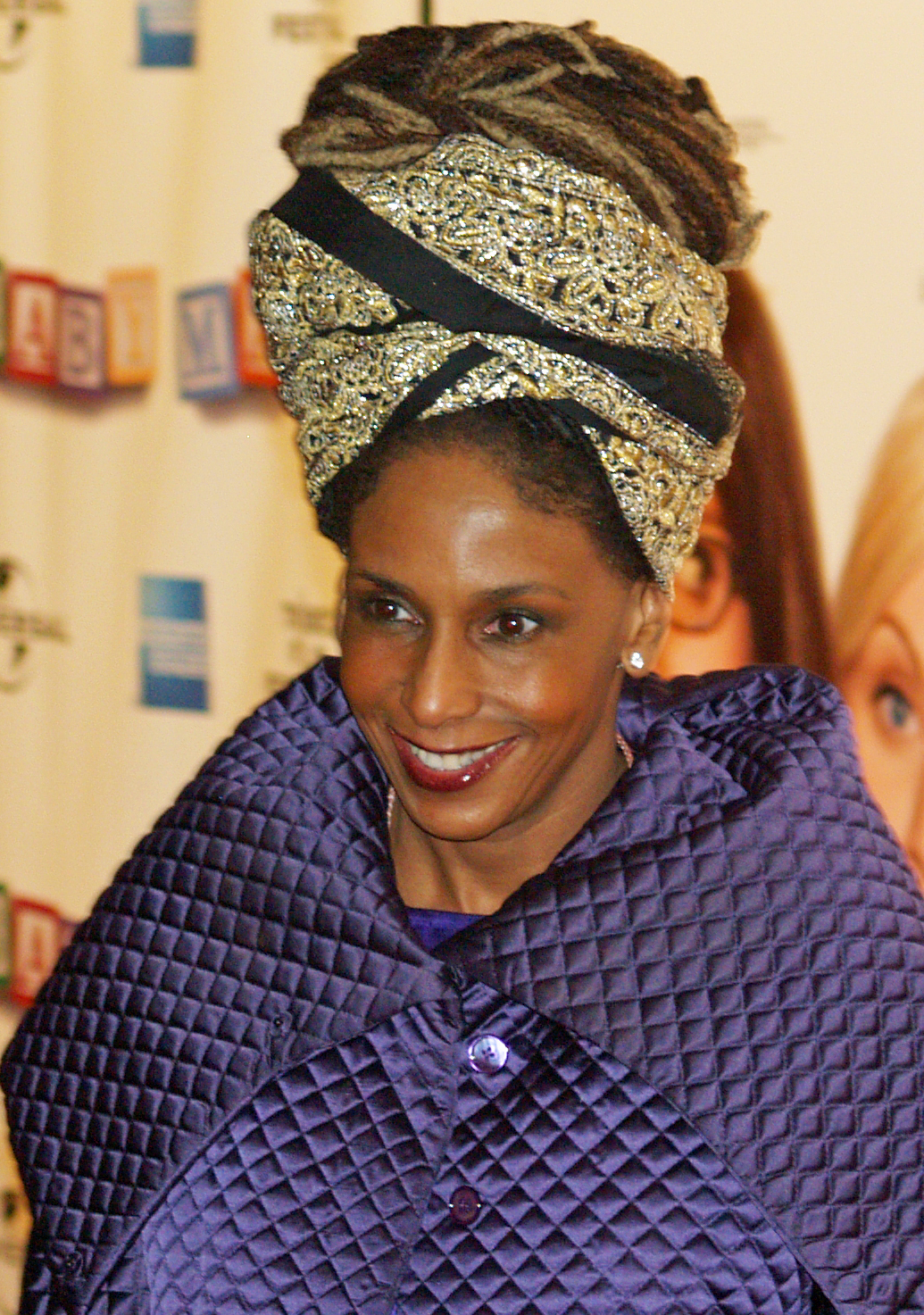
- Cox at the premiere of Baby Mama at the 2008 Tribeca Film Festival.
- Born: October 16, 1960 (age 66); Colgate, Jamaica
- Education: Syracuse University (B.A.); School of Visual Arts (M.F.A.) The Whitney Museum of American Art (I.S.P)
- Known for: Photography
- Notable work: Yo Mama's Last Supper
- Movement: Feminist art
- Awards: Creative Time Inc. for Street Poster Project (1993); Artists Fellowship Award from The New York Foundation for the Arts (1996); Artists-in-Residence Program at Light Works (1997); Aaron Matalon Award from The National Gallery of Jamaica (2007); Tribeca Film Festival Art Award (2007); Chrysalis Award from The Museum of Contemporary African Diasporan Arts (2006); Gold Rush Award (2015)

Renee Cox (born October 16, 1960) is a Jamaican-American artist, photographer, lecturer, political activist and curator. Her work is considered part of the feminist art movement in the United States. Among the best known of her provocative works are Queen Nanny of the Maroons, Raje and Yo Mama's Last Supper, which exemplify her Black Feminist politics. In addition, her work has provoked conversations at the intersections of cultural work, activism, gender, and African Studies. As a specialist in film and digital portraiture, Cox uses light, form, digital technology, and her own signature style to capture the identities and beauty within her subjects and herself.

== Background ==
Cox has "dedicated her career to deconstructing stereotypes and to reconfiguring the black woman's body, using her nude form as a subject." She uses herself as a primary model in order to promote an idea of "self-love" as articulated by bell hooks in her book Sisters of the Yam, because Cox has stated in interviews- like the Annual Rothschild Lecture- that slavery stripped Black men and women of their dignity and identity, and that its legacy continues to affect the African American psyche. One of Cox's main motivations has always been to create new, positive visual representations of African Americans. In her article, "A Gynocentric Aesthetic", Cox argues that a shift to matriarchal art will transform aesthetic expressions to interact with daily life and society, rather than compartmentalized artistic discussions that emphasize beauty over process and expression.

Greg Tate, writer for The Village Voice, wrote: "(Renee's) her own heroine. She's very much about using the work as a platform for self-love. And she's clearly having fun in her role playing. It's a very New York attitude: 'Yeah, so what? I'm Jesus. I'm Wonder Woman."

In addition to making art, Cox has curated and acted. She has done projects for Rush Art Gallery from its inception. In 1996 she curated an exhibition entitled No Doubt at The Aldrich Contemporary Art Museum in Ridgefield, Connecticut and she co-starred in Bridgett Davis' independent film Naked Acts, where she portrayed a photographer.

== Career ==
=== Editorial career ===
As a student at Syracuse University, Cox majored in film studies. After graduating, she decided to devote her energy to the realm of still photography. She began as an assistant fashion editor at Glamour Magazine and then moved to Paris to pursue a career as a fashion photographer. She spent three years working in Paris, shooting for magazines including Votre Beaute and Vogue Homme and for designers Issey Miyake and Claude Montana, among others.

Cox then returned to New York City, where she continued to work as a fashion photographer for ten years. Among her clients were editorial magazines such as Essence, Cosmopolitan, Mademoiselle, and Seventeen. She also worked with Spike Lee, producing the poster for his 1988 film School Daze.

In the early 1990s, inspired by the birth of her first son, Cox decided to focus primarily on fine art photography. She received her Master of Fine Arts at the School of Visual Arts in New York and subsequently spent a year working with Mary Kelly and Ron Clark in the Whitney Independent Study Program.

=== Fine arts career ===
In 1994, Cox exhibited her piece It Shall Be Named in the show Black Male: Representations of Masculinity in Contemporary American Art, curated by Thelma Golden at the Whitney Museum of American Art in New York City. A review of the show published in Art in America described the work as referring "back to traditional art forms—in this case, the shaped crucifixes of 13th and 14th century Italy—with deep solemnity. The modern "distortions" and elisions of Cox's representation interact with the reference to iconic martyrdom to evoke the terrible history of lynchings, beatings and emasculation visited on the bodies of black men in this country."

That same year, Cox's seven-foot nude self-portrait Yo Mama was included in the Bad Girls show curated by Marcia Tucker at the New Museum. Cox was the first woman ever to be pregnant during the Whitney Independent Study Program, pregnant at the time with her second son, which motivated her to create the Yo Mama character and series of photographs. In the photograph Cox stands nude, wearing black high heels, brandishing her older son as if he were a weapon. In Yo Mama and the Statue, Cox critiques race and gender issues, whilst attempting to "reconcile her persona as a pregnant black woman artist with the white male convention of museum study and classical statuary."

In 1995, Cox, Fo Wilson, and Tony Cokes created the Negro Art Collective (NAC) to fight cultural misrepresentations about Black Americans. The collective, working with Creative Time and Gee Street Records, created a poster campaign to challenge and provoke preconceived notions about race, crime and poverty. "As far as representation, we have to take it back," Cox explained to the Daily News. The NAC appropriated a quote from scholar Charles Murray and added their commentary so as to appropriate the quote for their purposes. The idea was to present viewers with real information, which flies in the face of what Americans are taught to believe. The 24 by 36 inch posters read: "Surprise, Surprise, 'in raw numbers, European-American whites are the ethnic group with the most people in poverty, most illegitimate children, most people on welfare, most unemployed men, and most arrests for serious crimes.' Surprised." The posters ran in Manhattan, Brooklyn and Los Angeles. The project was originally inspired by Cox's five-year-old son who had asked her one day: "Why are all black people bad?"

Soon after, Cox created her Raje alter-ego, a superhero who fights racism and teaches children African-American history. In 1998 the body of work was featured in a Fin de Siècle art festival in Nantes, France. Nantes was historically the last stop on the slave trade, before the ships were to return to Africa to pick up their human cargo. The photographs were installed on billboards all over the city.

In 1999, Cox's work was shown in the Venice Biennale, in the Oratorio di S. Ludovico, a 17th-century Catholic church, where her piece Yo Mama's Last Supper a contemporary re-imagining of Leonardo da Vinci's classic, was first shown. In Cox's reimagining of this historically iconic scene, she stood nude in the place of Jesus Christ and is surrounded by all black apostles, except for Judas, who is white. In 2001, the piece was included in a Brooklyn Museum of Art exhibition Committed to the Image: Contemporary Black Photographers, curated by Barbara Millstein.

In 2001, Cox opened a show at the Robert Miller Gallery called American Family. The series featured family snapshots, as well as older family photographs juxtaposed with erotic self-portraits, and new re-creations of art historical classics. "Olympia's Boyz" is featured in this show, which first appeared at the Brooklyn Museum in 2001. Cox has written: "The body of work was a rebellion against all of the pre-ordained roles I am supposed to embrace as a woman: dutiful daughter, diminutive wife, and doting mother."

Later that year Cox undertook another series of photographs, this one named for the Jamaican national heroine, Queen Nanny of the Maroons. In the series, Cox took on the persona of Queen Nanny, who led the Maroons to victory in the First Maroon War. Queen Nanny of the Maroons was originally shown at the Robert Miller Gallery in 2005. Cox then exhibited the body of work in the Jamaican Biennial in 2007 where it won the Aaron Matalon Award.

Cox continues to show her work as well as develop new projects as she is inspired. Her present work explores sacred geometry and the use of fractals to create sculptural kaleidoscopes. Soul Culture for Cox has marked her embrace of the digital world and her continued exploration of the human body as a site to engage viewers and evoke the practice of healthy and intersectional discourse.

=== Critical assessment ===
Writing for Vogue magazine, art critic Roberta Smith described Yo Mama as "one of the most striking images in the East Coast portion of the Bad Girls exhibition…A towering self-portrait, it showed the artist, naked except for a pair of black high heels, holding her two-year-old son…The image presents a woman, both regal and erotic, who seems singularly disinclined to take guff from anyone and whose son will undoubtedly grow up to respect her gender."

In 2001, Yo Mama's Last Supper sparked an enormous controversy when Rudy Giuliani, then mayor of New York City, saw the work and proceeded to accuse Cox of being anti-Catholic. Giuliani gained national attention when he subsequently called for the creation of a panel to create decency standards for all art shown in publicly funded museums in the city. Giuliani told the Daily News that he did "not believe that it is right for public money to be used to desecrate religion, to attack people's ethnicity."

Cox's Yo Mama is one of the focuses of writer Sheila F. Winborne's chapter, "Images of Jesus in Advancing Great Commission", in the book Teaching All Nations: Interrogating the Matthean Great Commission. Winborne describes Cox's Yo Mama as "fine", relating the piece to "The perpetuation of the myth that the realistically rendered white Christ is superior to all other representational approaches supports the perception that the main issue is about appearances as signs of cultural and spiritual value, whereas in reality the main concern is the power to control outcomes in one's own favor." Winborne further compares Cox's Yo Mama to popular representations of Christ by adding: "Ideas of white Christ as necessarily the most 'holy' of images reinforces the power of this myth's creators and supporters, along with the continued unequal treatment of others."

Cox publicly responded to Giuliani's accusations by defending her first amendment right to portray herself as Christ. As Cox explained, her Catholic school education taught her that all human beings were created in the likeness of God. "It's all very hypocritical," she was quoted as saying in the Daily News, "now that he has been busted with the other woman, I wouldn't be talking about moral issues." At the time, Giuliani had recently admitted his affair with long-time friend Judy Nathan and proceeded to divorce his wife, Donna Hanover.

Cox states that her reasoning for her Yo Mama's Last Supper piece was because "Christianity is big in the African-American community, but there are no presentations of us," Cox added, "I took it upon myself to include people of color in these classic scenarios."

This was the second time during Giuliani's tenure that he attempted to censor art shown in New York City's museums and it sparked a national controversy about artists' first amendment rights.

== Exhibition history ==
2026

- The New Art Gallery Walsall, Walsall, United Kingdom, Ten.8 afterimage (May 1–September 13)
- Fraenkel Gallery, San Francisco, California, Slice of the Pie: Fifteen Bay Area Galleries & What Makes Them Different (May 28–August 15)
- Ethan Cohen Gallery, New York City, Public Pool (June 11–July 25)
- Superposition, IT IS WRITTEN in the sand
- Ethan Cohen Gallery, Public Pool
- Ethan Cohen Gallery at 1-54 New York 2026

2025

- Jenkins Johnson Gallery, San Francisco, Infinite Hope
- Jenkins Johnson Gallery, San Francisco, In Their Hands
- Superposition Gallery, MAMI WATA
- Hannah Traore Gallery, New York City, Who? Me?
- Ethan Cohen Gallery, New York City, Afrofuturism (group exhibition, with Ellsworth Ausby, Nanette Carter, et al.)
- — Jenkins Johnson Gallery at FOG Design+Art 2025, San Francisco
- Tilton Gallery, NYC, Intrigue (January 23-March 15)

2024–2025

- Flight into Egypt: Black Artists and Ancient Egypt, 1876–Now, Metropolitan Museum of Art, New York City. Cox's Rajé to the Rescue (1998, printed 2024) was included in the exhibition.
- Silver Lining: Celebrating the Spelman Art Collection, University of Michigan (August 24-January 5)

2024

- Solo: UTA Artist Space, Atlanta, Georgia (February 23–March 23): RENEE COX by RENEE COX
- Unapologetic WomXn @ Venice Biennale, Ross-Sutton Gallery
- Jenkins Johnson Gallery at Paris Photo 2024
- Solo: Renee Cox: Revolution/Revelation, Newport Art Museum, Newport RI (June 15-October 6)

2023–2024

- Solo: Art on Hulfish: The Ten Commandments of Renée Cox, Princeton University Art Museum, Princeton, NJ (Klaudia Ofwona Draber, curator), November 18, 2023 – January 28, 2024

2023

- Spelman College Museum of Fine Art, Atlanta, Georgia, Black American Portraits (February 8–June 30)
- Subliminal Projects, Los Angeles, California, Visual Language: The Art of Protest (February 11–March 25)
  - Solo: Renée Cox: A Proof of Being, Guild Hall, East Hampton, NY (Monique Long, curator), July 2 – September 4, 2023
  - It's Pablo-matic: Picasso According to Hannah Gadsby, Brooklyn Museum, Brooklyn, NY
  - Solo: Art on Hulfish: The Ten Commandments of Renée Cox, Princeton University Art Museum, Princeton, NJ (Klaudia Ofwona Draber, curator), November 18, 2023 – January 28, 2024

2022

- Solo:Hannah Traore Gallery, New York City, Soul Culture, (April 14–May 28)
- Wallach Art Gallery, Columbia University, New York City, UPTOWN 2020
- Maryland Institute College of Art (MICA), Baltimore, Migrations and Meanings in Art
- Cox's immersive video installation Soul Culture (2022), Exploring Sacred Geometry and Fractals, premiered at the Mattress Factory in Pittsburgh and had its New York premiere at Guild Hall in 2023.
- Unit Gallery, London, Sensitive Content

2021

- The Signing acquired by Princeton University Art Museum; artist talk, April 15, 2021

2020

- Renée V. Cox Papers, Archives of American Art, Smithsonian Institution, Washington, D.C.The archive contains Cox's professional papers and a substantial printed-material component. This is likely the single most important source for locating press clippings that have disappeared from the web or were never digitized. The Smithsonian announced the acquisition in 2020, and its finding information identifies a printed-material series extending from the 1970s through 2018. (American Alliance of Museums￼)

2018

- Faction Art Projects, Harlem, New York City, Harlem Perspectives (April 20–May 13)
- Mana Contemporary, Jersey City, New Jersey, Please Touch: Body Boundaries (April 29–August 1)
- Elizabeth A. Sackler Center for Feminist Art, Brooklyn Museum, New York City, Half the Picture: A Feminist Look at the Collection (August 23, 2018–March 31, 2019)
- Miriam and Ira D. Wallach Art Gallery, Columbia University, New York City, Posing Modernity: The Black Model from Manet and Matisse to Today (October 24, 2018–February 10, 2019)

2017–2018

- Columbia Museum of Art, Columbia, South Carolina, Soul Culture solo exhibition, December 15, 2017–April 22, 2018)

2017

- Columbia University Gallery, New York City, The Uptown Show
- Sprüth Magers, Los Angeles, California, The Power Show

2016

- Columbia Museum of Art, Columbia, South Carolina, Remix, Themes and Variations in African American Art
  - The New Art Gallery, Walsall, UK
- Renee Cox: Revisiting the Queen Nanny Series, Columbia University, New York (Rich Blint, curator), Jan 22 – Apr 14, 2016
- Black Pulp!, Yale School of Art, New Haven
- Remix, Themes and Variations in African American Art, Columbia Museum of Art, South Carolina

2015

- Family Affair, University of South Florida Contemporary Art Museum,
- Solo:
  - Tropiques-Atrium, Fort-de-France, Martinique, (Dominique Brebion, Curator)

2014

- Paula Modersohn-Becker Museum, Bremen, Germany, Me.Myself.Naked
- Perez Art Museum, Miami, Caribbean: Crossroads of the World
- Virginia Museum of Fine Arts, Posing Beauty in African American Culture
- The Power Plant Contemporary Art Gallery, Toronto, Canada, Pictures from Paradise: A Survey of Contemporary Caribbean Photography

2013

- El Museo del Barrio, Queens Museum of Art and The Studio Museum in Harlem, Caribbean: Crossroads of the World

2012

- Kade / Kunsthal in Amersfoort, Holland. Who's More Sci-Fi Than Us, contemporary art from the Caribbean.

2011

- Museo Thyssen-Bornemisza, Madrid, Spain, Heroines

2010

- Tate Liverpool, Afro Modern, Journeys through the Black Atlantic

2009

- Hood Museum of Art, Dartmouth College, New Hampshire, Black Womanhood: Images, Icons, and Ideologies of the African Body
- Grande Halle de la Villette, Paris, Kréyol Factory
- Spelman College Museum of Fine Art, Georgia, Undercover: Performing and Transforming Black Female Identities

2008

- Arlington Arts Center, Virginia, She's So Articulate, (Jeffry Cudlin & Henry L. Thaggert Co-Curators)
- Mabel Smith Douglass Library Gallery, Rutgers University, New Jersey, Never Has She Ever...
- Solo:
  - Discreet Charm of the Bougie, Gallery Nodine Zidoun, Paris, France

2007

- Jamaican Biennial, The National Gallery of Jamaica, Kingston, Jamaica
- New York Historical Society, Legacies: Contemporary Artists Reflect on Slavery, New York
- Rhodes College, Tennessee, Taking Aim, Selections from the Elliot L. Perry Collection
- Yale Center for British Art, Art & Emancipation Worlds

2006-2008

- Wadsworth Atheneum Museum of Art, Hartford, CT, Soul Food!

2006

- Gigantic ArtSpace, New York, Artificial Afrika

2005

- The Studio Museum of Harlem, New York, African Queen
- Nasher Museum of Art at Duke University, Durham, North Carolina, The Forest: Politics, poetics, and Practice
- Solo:
  - Robert Miller Gallery, New York, Renee Cox: Queen Nanny of the Maroons

2004

- Busan Biennale 2004, Busan, South Korea

2003-2004

- Contemporary Arts Museum, Houston, Splat Boom Pow! The influence of Comics in Contemporary Art

2003

- Henry Radford Hope School of fine Arts, Indiana University, Bloomington, Feminine Persuasion

2002

- Robert Miller Gallery, New York, Art & Outrage (exhibition presented by the Trio Network, Inc, and USA Cable)

2001

- Brooklyn Museum, Brooklyn, Committed to the Image (Barbara Millstein, Curator)
- Solo:
  - Robert Miller Gallery, New York, Renee Cox: American Family

2000

- Smithsonian Anacostia Museum and Center for African American History and Culture, Washington, DC, Reflections in Black: A History of Black Photography (Deborah Willis, Curator)
- Solo:
  - Ambrosino Gallery, Coral Gables, FL, Peoples Project 2000

1999

- Fin de Siecle, Nantes, Frances, New York a Nantes (Patricia Solini, Curator)
- The New Museum of Contemporary Art, New York, Picturing of the Modern Amazon (Laurie Fierstein, Curator)

1998

- Looking Forward Looking Back, Elaine L. Jacob Gallery, Wayne State University, Detroit
- Venice Biennale, Oratorio di S. Ludivico/New School, Venice (Kathy Goncharov, Curator)

1997

- Herbert F. Johnson Museum of Art, Cornell University, Ithaca, NY, Gendered Visions (Prof. Salah Hassan and Dorothy Desir-Davis, Curators)

1996

- Aldrich Museum, Ridgefield, CT, No Doubt (Renee Cox, Curator)
- Solo:
  - Cristinerose Gallery, New York, Raje: A Superhero: The Beginning of a Bold New Era

1995

- Pace/McGill Gallery, New York, Large Bodies (Peter McGill Curator)
- The Institute of Contemporary Art (ICA), Boston, Sites of Being (Milena Kalinovska and Lia Gangitano, Curator)

1993

- Whitney Museum of American Art, New York, Black Male: Representations of Masculinity in Contemporary Art (Thelma Golden, Curator)
- Museum of Contemporary Art, New York, Bad Girls (Marcia Tucker, Curator)

== Publication list ==
Books

- Bonazzoli, Francesca; Robecchi, Michele. Mona Lisa to Marge: How the World's Greatest Artworks Entered Popular Culture.
- Berger, Maurice. No Doubt: African-American Art of the 90's. Aldrich Museum of Contemporary Art.
- 2004 Busan Biennale Catalogue. Busan, South Korea.
- Cassel, Valerie; Sabin, Roger; Weldt, Bernard; Mayo, Marti. Splat Boom Pow! The Influence of Cartoons in Contemporary Art.
- Copeland, Cynthia R.; Hulser, Kathleen; Stokes Sims, Lowery, Legacies: Contemporary Artists Reflect on Slavery
- Coq, Christian. Kreyol Factory
- Cox, Renee; Isaak, Jo Anna. Renee Cox: American family.
- Cullen, Deborah; Fuentes, Elvis. Caribbean: Art at the Crossroads of the World.
- Double Exposure: African Americans Before and Behind the Camera. Amistad Center for Art & Culture exhibition catalogue.
- Dunye, Cheryl; Goode Bryant, Linda; Tanner, Marcia; Tucker, Marcia. Bad Girls
- Farrington, Lisa. Art & identity: the African-American aesthetic at the New School
- Danto, Arthur C. Unnatural Wonders: Essays from the Gap Between Art and Life. Columbia University Press, 2005. ISBN 978-0231141154.
- Dailey, Megan; Harris, Jane; Valdez, Sarah, eds. Curve: The Female Nude Now. Universe, 2003. ISBN 978-0789308719.
- Frames of Reference: From Object to Subject. Wesleyan University Center for the Arts exhibition catalogue.
- Foner, Eric. Give Me Liberty!: An American History (Fourth Edition) (Vol. 1).
- Farrington, Lisa E., ed. Black Artists in Their Own Words. University of California Press, 2025. ISBN 978-0520384149.
- Field, Genevieve, ed. Nerve/The New Nude. Chronicle Books, 2001. ISBN 978-0811831079*Heartney, Eleanor; Posner, Helaine; Princenthal, Nancy, Scott, Sue. The Reckoning: Women Artists of the New Millennium.
- Hobson, Janell. Venus in the Dark: Blackness and Beauty in Popular Culture.
- Hoffmann, Nancy. Who More Sci-Fi Than Us?: Contemporary Art from the Caribbean.
- Harris, Melissa; Famighetti, Michael, eds. Aperture Conversations: 1985 to the Present. Aperture, 2018.
- Hassan, Salah M., ed. Gendered Visions: The Art of Contemporary Africana Women Artists. Africa World Press, 1997. ISBN 978-0865436190. Includes Bob Meyers's essay "What Is My Legacy? Transient Consciousness and the 'Fixed' Subject in the Photography of Reneé Cox."
- Heartney, Eleanor. Postmodern Heretics: Catholic Imagination in Contemporary Art. Midmarch Arts Press. ISBN 978-1877675508.
- International Olympic Fine Arts 2008 / International Oil Painting Collection. Beijing.
- Isaac, Jo Anna. Looking Forward, Looking Black.
- Jamaica National Biennial 2006 Exhibition Catalogue.
- Jay Z, Decoded
- Jones, Amelia. Self/Image: Technology, Representation, and the Contemporary Subject
- Lawrence, O'Neil. Pictures from Paradise: A Survey of Contemporary Caribbean Photography.
- Liss, Andrea. Feminist Art and the Maternal.
- Lotz, Leo. Bizarro World! The Parallel Universes of Comics & Fine Arts
- McCarthy, David. The Nude in Contemporary Art. Aldrich Museum of Contemporary Art. ISBN 1888332107.
- Miglietti Alfano, Francesca. Red: Mutation, Blood and Transfiguration in Contemporary Art. Electa.
- Paglia, Camille. Glittering Images: A Journey Through Art from Egypt to Star Wars. Pantheon, 2012. ISBN 0375424601.
- Perrée, Rob. Postcards from Black America: Hedendaagse Afrikaans-Amerikaanse Kunst. Con Rumore.
- Phaidon Editors. Body of Art. Phaidon, 2015.
- Phaidon Editors. Great Women Photographers. Phaidon, 2026. ISBN 978-1837292141.
- Powell, Richard J. Black Art: A Cultural History. Revised edition. Thames & Hudson, 2002. ISBN 978-0500203620.
- Preziosi, Donald, ed. The Art of Art History: A Critical Anthology. Oxford University Press, 1998. ISBN 978-0199229840.
- Plate, S. Brent. Blasphemy: Art that Offends
- Ramljak, Suzanne. Wonder Women: Idols in Contemporary Art. Katonah Museum of Art.
- Rubbini, Alice; Weiermair, Peter. Libera Mente: La Figurazione del Sentimento. Charta. ISBN 978-8881581719.
- Ruud, Brandon K., ed. Encounters: Photography from the Sheldon Museum of Art. University of Nebraska Press, 2012. ISBN 978-0803245181.
- Reid-Pharr, Robert F.; Delany, Samuel R. Black Gay Man: Essays.
- Rosenfeld Dassel, Sara. Dramatis personae: a look at role-playing and narrative in contemporary photography.
- Renée Cox & Victor Matthews. Exhibition catalogue. Biennale di Venezia, 1999.
- Solana, Guillermo. Heroinas
- Stirratt, Betsy; Johnson, Catherine. Feminine Persuasion: Art and Essays on Sexuality.
- Szeemann, Harald. Venice Biennale 1999: Over All - 48th Exposition of International Art, Aperto.
- Schroth, Angela, curator. Transafricana – Artisti Contemporanei. Edizioni Lai-Momo, Bologna, 2000.
- Thompson, Barbara. Black Womanhood: Images, Icons, and Ideologies of the African Body.
- Undercover: Performing and Transforming Black Female Identities. Spelman College Museum of Fine Art exhibition catalogue.
- Willis, Deborah. Black Venus 2010: They Called Her "Hottentot".
- Willis, Deborah; Williams, Carla. The Black Female Body: A Photographic History
- X Ball, Barry; Steensma, Regnerus; Nieboer, Jan Willem; Blaettler, James R. The one chosen: images of Christ in recent New York art
- Yee, Lydia. Urban Mythologies: The Bronx Represented Since 1960's

Magazines and journals

- Valentine, Gioncarlo (2024). "Renée Cox's Visions of the Future." The New Yorker, September 28, 2024.
- Charles, Nick. "Art of fighting stereotypes." Daily News
- Colangelo, Lisa and Michael R. Blood "Rufy & 'Yo Mama,'" Daily News
- Eversley, Shelly; Morgan, Jennifer. The Sexual Body: WSQ: Spring / Summer 2007.
- Srivastav, Vinita. "The Woman Behind the Storm." Savoy Magazine, May 2001
- The Sunday Review 10 July 2000. "Pride and Prejudice", The Independent on Sunday.
- Nochlin, Linda. "Learning From 'Black Male'" Art in America, March 1995
- Smith, Roberta. "Body of Evidence." Vogue, August 1994
- Blanch, Andrea. "From Our Archives: Renee Cox." Musée Magazine, February 2021.
- Carroll, Angela N. "The Radical Imaginaries of Renee Cox." Sugarcane Magazine, July 13, 2020.
- "A Proof of Being | Renée Cox." Musée Magazine, August 30, 2023.
- Escalante-De Mattei, Shanti. "Renee Cox Gets the Showcase She Deserves at East Hampton's Newly Reopened Guild Hall." ARTnews, June 30, 2023.
- Heartney, Eleanor. "Thinking Through the Body: Women Artists and the Catholic Imagination." Hypatia, 2003.
- "Life of the Artist: Renee Cox." Rethinking The Future, January 2023.
- Moylan, Chris. "Renee Cox." artcritical, 2001.
- Schambelan, Elizabeth. "Renee Cox at Robert Miller." Art in America, June 2002.
- "Renee Cox on Flipping the Script." The East Hampton Star, April 7, 2021.
- "Renee Cox: Soul Culture @ Hannah Traore." Collector Daily, April 28, 2022.
- "Renee Cox: The Holy Family." Talking Pictures, November 30, 2019.
- "The Ten Commandments of Renée Cox." Princeton University Art Museum, January 29, 2024.
- Smith, Roberta. "ART IN REVIEW; Renée Cox." The New York Times, November 2, 2001.
- "The Catholic Provocations of Renée Cox." Pittsburgh Review.
- "The Erotics of Coreen Simpson." The New Yorker, October 11, 2025.
- "Black Venus: The Legacy of Black Woman Representation Seen by Contemporary Female Artists." Vogue, June 8, 2022.
- Jansen, Charlotte. "Black Venus review – female bodies reclaimed in spectacular style." The Guardian, July 18, 2023.
- Cotter, Holland. "At Frieze New York 2023, One-Person Shows That Shine." The New York Times, May 18, 2023.
- Brody, Richard. "The Rediscovery of 'Naked Acts' Expands Film History." The New Yorker, 2024.
- Cox, Renée. "Should I Trust My Art Dealer?" Hyperallergic, April 5, 2024.
- "Required Reading." Hyperallergic, 2024.
- Bianpoen, Carla. "Revisiting 'The Last Supper'." The Jakarta Post, April 11, 2009.
- "Art of This World: Renee Cox's 'Sacred Geometry'." Futuristically Ancient, August 12, 2014.

Newspapers

- Bumiller, Elisabeth. "Affronted by Nude 'Last Supper,' Giuliani Calls for Decency Panel." The New York Times, February 16, 2001.
- Williams, Monte. "'Yo Mama' Artist Takes On Catholic Critic." The New York Times, February 21, 2001.
- "Naked Jesus Angers Giuliani." BBC News, February 16, 2001.
- "Controversy Rages Over Artists' Depiction of Jesus as Nude Woman." CNN Morning News, February 16, 2001.
- "A Controversy Creates Undeserved Hype." Los Angeles Times, March 12, 2001.
- "Hail to the Mayor." CounterPunch, February 22, 2001.
- "Yo Mama's Orthodoxy." Killing the Buddha, March 4, 2001.

Academic publications

- Brand, Peg. "Feminist Art Epistemologies: Understanding Feminist Art." 2006.
- Dietschy, Nathalie. "L'autoportrait en Christ de Renee Cox: étude d'un scandale." Études de lettres, 2008.
- "Policing Black Women's Sexual Expression: The Cases of Sarah Jones and Renee Cox." Genders, 2011.
- "Putting on a Bold-Face: How Renee Cox and Sonia Boyce Pull Ethnographic Art Apart."
- "Reading Against the Grain of the Black Madonna." Open Book Publishers.
- "Black Matrilineage, Photography, and …" JSTOR.
- Gainer, K. Y. "Challenging the Narrative Through the Work of Renée Cox." Graduate thesis, 2019.

Reference works

- Tinti, Mary. "Cox, Renée." Grove Art / Oxford Art Online.
- "Cox, Renée." Encyclopedia.com.

Archival sources

- Renée V. Cox Papers. Archives of American Art, Smithsonian Institution.
