= Folayemi Wilson =

American designer, artist, academic administrator

- Born: Folayemi Debra Wilson
- Other name: Fo Wilson
- Education: New York University Stern School of Business (MBA), Rhode Island School of Design (MFA)
- Occupations: designer, furniture maker, artist, curator, writer, academic administrator
- Known for: graphic design, installation art, furniture design
- Movement: Afrofuturism
- Awards: MacDowell fellowship (2018)
- Website: www.fowilson.com

Folayemi "Fo" Debra Wilson is an American interdisciplinary artist, designer, and academic administrator. Her practice includes working as a furniture designer and maker, installation artist, muralist, and graphic designer. Wilson is the first associate dean for access and equity in the Penn State College of Arts and Architecture.

== Early life and education ==
She is the youngest child of Katherine Elizabeth Kilpatrick Wilson, a hairdresser, and Milton H. Wilson Sr., a handy person who taught her how to upholster furniture in her teens. Her father was also an avid reader, whose many magazines inspired Wilson's imagination, as did his love of bright colors. After her mother died when she was thirteen years old, she was advised on graduating early from high school, and she began to travel and live on her own.

Her brother introduced her to the National Black Theatre of Harlem (NBT) in 1972, where they attended "a happening" together. She appreciated the group's spiritual practices and began taking theatre classes to overcome her shyness, eventually joining the troupe. It was with the NBT that she traveled to Nigeria for six weeks to study Yoruba culture for a play the company was writing, a trip funded by the National Endowment for the Arts. She took on the name Folayemi during these influential travels.

Wilson is a self-taught graphic designer. She has an MBA degree from New York University Stern School of Business, and a MFA degree (2005) in furniture design from Rhode Island School of Design (RISD). During graduate study, she connected the formal and conceptual language of 20th-century Modernism with Black cultural memory and cosmology, noting that they "share the same roots." She also took furniture classes at UC Berkeley.

== Design career ==
Wilson began designing while in the National Black Theatre of Harlem, designing posters and materials for the group. In her early career, Wilson worked as a graphic designer, art director, and creative director. She worked for Essence, YSB, and Black Enterprise magazines. Ed Towles, the Art Director at Black Enterprise, was a particular influence. In 1984, Wilson was named the first female art director at Essence. In 1991, she established Studio W., a graphic design studio, building off her professional experiences from work in the magazine industry.

In August 2016, she co-founded the blkHaUS Studios with Norman Teague, a design studio based in Chicago. Their work was social practice–focused, in order to make public spaces in Chicago more inviting. The blkHaUS Studios' Back Alley Jazz project worked to revive the jazz culture and traditions found in Chicago in the 1960s and 1970s; they brought together local musicians, architects and artists to build events and performance spaces.

== Visual art career ==
In 1995, Wilson, along with artists Renee Cox, and Tony Cokes, created the Negro Art Collective (NAC) to fight cultural misrepresentations about Black Americans.Their first public intervention, Mama I Thought Only Black People Were Bad, was a provocative street art campaign in New York and Los Angeles that challenged stereotypes of Black criminality using data and visual rhetoric.

Her Seeing series (2006) included minimalist black furniture pieces juxtaposed with photographic diptychs and her own body, prompting viewers to question how racial and cultural identity are perceived and constructed through objects.

In 2008, Wilson constructed a fictitious, 19th-century style scientific exhibition commemorating Saartje Baartman (also known as "The Hottentot Venus") during a residency at the School of Art + Design at SUNY/Purchase, called Hottentot Not! using bell jars and tables, accompanied by diary entries she wrote from Baartman's imagined perspective. The same year, she used excerpts from Nicki Minaj in her piece Sara's Lament, uplifting women in the name of Sartje Baartman and unfair racial representation in society. Wilson additionally explores similar issues regarding of race and prejudiced portrayals around the world in The Women Wanted Some of Me Too (2008).

Her 2010 exhibition, The New Materiality: Digital Dialogues at the Boundaries of Contemporary Craft, explores relationship between handcraft practices and digital technology.

Her 2016 installation Eliza's Peculiar Cabinet of Curiosities, is a fictitious 19th century slave cabin constructed at full-scale, containing a cabinet of curiosities filled with 100 items representing what an African American woman of this time period may have owned or dreamed of owning. Eliza's Peculiar Cabinet of Curiosities was an ongoing, Afrofuturist project and was used as a location for related events and performances. It was on display from 2016 to 2017 at the Lynden Sculpture Garden in Milwaukee, Wisconsin. In 2018, Wilson spent time at the John Michael Kohler Arts/Industry Artist Residency Program to work with pottery.

In 2019, she was commissioned to create public art for the Chicago Transit Authority (CTA) within the newly built Damen Green Line station. Her work is in the museum collection at the Cooper Hewitt, Smithsonian Design Museum. Wilson has served on the board of the American Craft Council (ACC).

== Influences ==
Wilson’s early life and creative development are traced through her formative encounters with Afrofuturism, Black spirituality, and self-exploration. Her introduction to Afrofuturism began in adolescence through listening to Alice Coltrane’s Journey to Satchidananda, sparking a new sense of self during years marked by meditation and spiritual chanting. She was also deeply influenced by Black Nationalism and the spiritual teachings she received at the National Black Theatre of Harlem. A pivotal moment for Wilson occurred in the summer of 1974, when she traveled to Nigeria to research Yoruba religion and culture for a play the NBT was writing called Soul Journey into Truth, centered on Oshun, the goddess of love and fertility, envisioned as a liberating force for African Americans. While staying at the compound of the artist Twins Seven Seven in Osogbo Village and visiting the University of Ibadan, Wilson deepened her understanding of African spirituality, drew on her genetic connection to oriki (Yoruba praise poetry), and experienced a personal awakening through as̩e̩, the Yoruba concept of spiritual power. She later returned to Nigeria to perform in Lagos at the International Arts Festival Festac ’77.

This experience inspired her to create Dark Matter: Celestial Objects as Messengers of Love in These Troubled Times, a solo exhibition presented at the Hyde Park Art Center (HPAC) in Chicago Illinois, March 31 through July 14, 2019. This exhibition is an immersive, multimedia installation that combines architecture, sculpture, sound, and video to create a celestial Afrofuturist environment that explores themes of ancestry, memory, and identity. It serves as a homage to the cultural figures, histories, and aesthetic movements that influenced Wilson's artistic practice. Dark Matter references the transatlantic slave trade by evoking what Wilson calls a “transplanetary Middle Passage,” blending speculative futures with ancestral pasts. Through layered sensory elements, Wilson constructs a space for reflection on Black presence, absence, and becoming across time and space. The exhibit also offered opportunities for guided sound baths, meditation sessions, and sound recording events.

== Academic career ==
In July 2021, Wilson was appointed as first associate dean for access and equity in the Penn State College of Arts and Architecture. She previously was the co-director of academic diversity, equity and inclusion at the Columbia College Chicago.

== Publications ==
- McLaughlin, Beth; Wilson, Fo (2010). The New Materiality: Digital Dialogues at the Boundaries of Contemporary Craft (exhibition). Stephanie Cole (artist). Fuller Craft Museum. ISBN 9780934358217.
- Wilson, Fo (2013). The Baartman Diaries (Chicago, Illinois: Studio W Editions).
- Dark Matter: Celestial Objects as Messengers of Love in These Troubled Times (exhibition). Folayemi Wilson (artist). Candor Arts. 2021.
