= The Rob Nelson Show =

American television talk show

- Genre: Talk show
- Presented by: Rob Nelson
- Country of origin: United States
- Original language: English
- No. of seasons: 1

Production
- Executive producers: Linda Ellman (2002); David Armour (2002–2003)
- Running time: 42–43 minutes
- Production companies: Monet Lane Productions; Ellman Entertainment Twentieth Television

Original release
- Network: Syndication
- Release: September 16, 2002 – January 3, 2003

The Rob Nelson Show is an American daytime talk show that was hosted by Rob Nelson. The show ran in syndication for one season from September 16, 2002, to January 3, 2003.

== Format ==
The Rob Nelson Show is an hour-long daytime talk show that was hosted by television presenter Rob Nelson. In its first six weeks, the show typically featured several guests on stage who discussed their thoughts on a given topic, such as female body image or the dangers of gang life. The show then reformatted into a tabloid talk show, in which it shifted its focus to single-issue discussions with an emphasis on audience interaction. Nelson moderated discussions and periodically handed off his microphone to audience members to make additional comments. Under this new format, the show featured topics such as a man who intended to raise money to cut off his feet with a guillotine, a mother who became a legal prostitute, and a human guinea pig.

== Production ==
=== Conception and development ===
In 1992, Nelson co-founded the advocacy group Lead or Leave, which advocated for reducing the national deficit. His political involvement throughout the 1990s received coverage by the news media, which culminated in him hosting The Full Nelson, a political talk show on Fox News. Following the show's conclusion, Twentieth Television offered Nelson his own talk show under the belief that he was "the next Phil Donahue". According to executive producer Linda Ellman, "[Nelson will] bring the same blend of credibility and compassion to his show that made Donahue a talk-show franchise." Nelson hoped to host an unconventional talk show that improved the negative reputation of daytime television in the United States.

The show was produced by Monet Lane Productions in association with Twentieth Television. Linda Ellman served as the show's executive producer; however, she was replaced by David Armour in October 2002. The show ceased production on December 18, 2002.

=== Topic selection ===
Nelson attempted to distance his show from tabloid talk shows like Jerry Springer, stating, "It's about our real world. It's about relationships, our jobs, our struggles with sexuality, trying to understand one another and everything that happens to us in our day-to-day lives."

== Broadcast history and release ==
On November 25, 2002, Nelson appeared nude in an episode about "nudity's role in culture and morality". On December 5, 2002, it was announced that the show was on hiatus. On December 18, 2002, Twentieth Television announced that the show was canceled, in which it cited the show's low ratings.

== Reception ==
=== Television viewership and ratings ===
The show's premiere, which was broadcast in 50 metered markets, averaged a 1.2/4. Its viewership slightly dropped in the show's second week, in which it averaged a 0.9 rating. The show averaged a 1.0 rating throughout its run.

=== Critical response ===
Josh Friedman of the Los Angeles Times claimed that the show, despite having a positive message, was dull.
