= Jelani Cobb =

American writer, author and educator (born 1969)

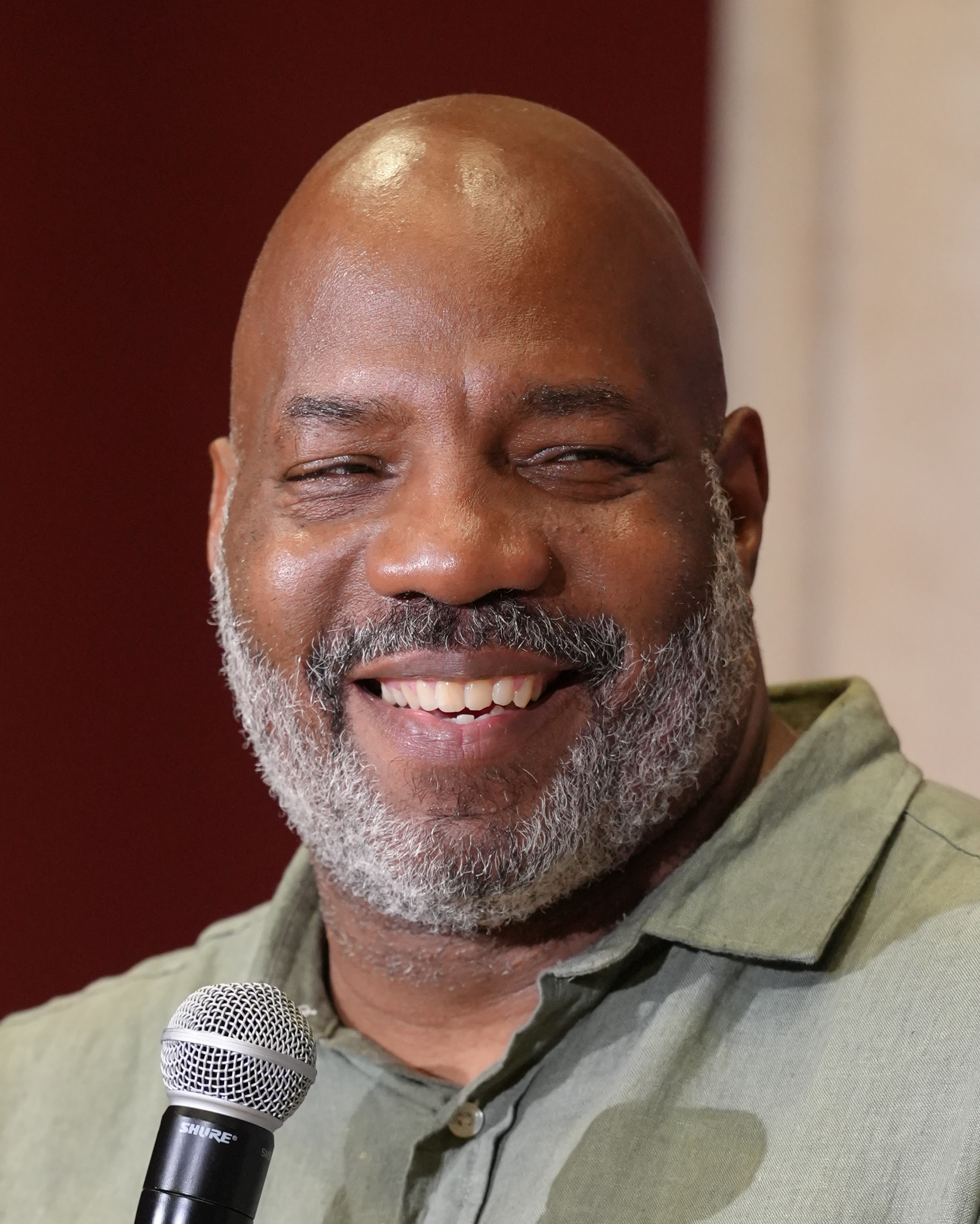
- Cobb at 2026 Essence Festival of Culture
- Born: William Jelani Cobb; August 21, 1969 (age 57); New York City, U.S.
- Education: Howard University (BA); Rutgers University, New Brunswick (MA, PhD)
- Occupations: Writer, author, educator
- Organization(s): Columbia University; The New Yorker
- Title: Dean and Henry R. Luce Professor of Journalism at Columbia Journalism School Former Ira A. Lipman Professor of Journalism

William Jelani Cobb (born William Anthony Cobb; August 21, 1969) is an American writer, author, educator, and dean of the Columbia Journalism School.

Before joining Columbia University as the Ira A. Lipman Professor of Journalism in 2016, Cobb was an associate professor of history and director of the Institute for African American Studies at the University of Connecticut from 2012 to 2016. Since 2015, he has been a staff writer at The New Yorker.

== Early life ==
William Jelani Cobb was born in Queens, New York, on August 21, 1969, the youngest of four children. Both of Cobb's parents had migrated from the American South, where they did not have access to high-quality schools. As a result, they were determined to give reading and learning important places in their family life.

Cobb counted being taught to write at an early age by his father, Willie Lee Cobb—an electrician with a third-grade education—among his earliest memories. On his website, Cobb described his father's "huge hand engulfing mine as he showed me how to scrawl the alphabet." His father was also a Catholic who raised him in the faith; his birth namesake was St. Anthony.

Cobb attended Jamaica High School followed by Howard University in Washington, D.C., where it took him seven years to complete his undergraduate degree because he did not consistently have the funds to pay tuition. At Rutgers University, he received a PhD in American history in May 2003 under the supervision of David Levering Lewis.

== Career ==
Cobb has received fellowships from the Fulbright and Ford Foundations.

While studying at Howard, Cobb began his professional writing career, first publishing at a short-lived periodical called One. In time, he began contributing to the Washington City Paper. His first national outlet was YSB magazine, part of the Black Entertainment Television, Inc. media empire, beginning in 1993. He also became more politically active during this time, and was involved with an organization that took over Howard's administration building in 1989. It was around this time that Cobb, seeking to connect more with African tradition, decided to add "Jelani"—a word meaning "powerful"—to his name.

Cobb specializes in post-Civil War African-American history, 20th-century American politics, and the history of the Cold War. He served as a delegate and historian for the 5th Congressional District of Georgia at the 2008 Democratic National Convention. He previously taught at Rutgers and Spelman College.

In 2018, Cobb appeared as himself in the final episode of Marvel's Luke Cage season 2.

In an August 2022 interview with Politico Magazine, Cobb, discussing his goals as dean of the Columbia Journalism School (CJS), said he wanted to help "make the [journalism] field itself more democratic. I don’t have any illusions about how complicated that undertaking will be."

In March 2025, Cobb met with students following the detention of Mahmoud Khalil, offering a frank assessment of the dangers journalists — especially international students — could face: "I would do everything in my power to defend our journalists and their right to report but... none of us had the capacity to stop DHS from jeopardizing their safety. It was important to speak directly to the threats journalists were likely to confront in reporting on the situation on campus not to dissuade students but to give them a honest rendering of the risks it entailed."

In 2025, he was named Humanist of the Year by the American Humanist Association.

== Publications ==
Cobb's books include The Substance of Hope: Barack Obama and the Paradox of Progress (Walker, 2010) and To the Break of Dawn: A Freestyle on the Hip Hop Aesthetic (2007), which was a finalist for the 2007 National Award for Arts Writing of the Arts Club of Washington. His collection The Devil & Dave Chappelle and Other Essays was published the same year. Cobb has contributed to a number of anthologies, including In Defense of Mumia, Testimony, Mending the World and Beats, Rhymes and Life, and his articles and essays have appeared in The Washington Post, The New Yorker, Essence, Vibe, Emerge, The Progressive, The Washington City Paper, One Magazine, Ebony and TheRoot.com. He has also been a featured commentator on National Public Radio, CNN, Al-Jazeera, CBS News, and other national broadcast outlets.

While doing research at the New York University library, Cobb stumbled upon a cache of previously unpublished writings by Harold Cruse, an influential scholar. Cobb tracked down Cruse at a retirement home in Ann Arbor, Michigan, and obtained permission to organize and edit Cruse's writings and publish them in book form. The result, The Essential Harold Cruse: A Reader, edited by Cobb with a foreword by Stanley Crouch, was published in 2002; it was listed as a 2002 Notable Book of The Year by Black Issues Book Review. It enhanced Cobb's stature among the African-American Studies community.

Cobb has authored several books, including a scholarly monograph based on his doctoral thesis titled Antidote to Revolution: African American Anticommunism and the Struggle for Civil Rights, 1931–1957.

In 2003, Cobb wrote of the William Lynch speech, "it is absolutely fake".

== Bibliography ==
=== Books ===
- Cruse, Harold (2002). William Jelani Cobb (ed.). The essential Harold Cruse : a reader. Foreword by Stanley Crouch. New York: Palgrave.
- Cobb, William Jelani (2004). Antidote to Revolution: African American Anticommunism and the Struggle for Civil Rights, 1931–1957. New York: Columbia University Press.
- — (2007). The devil & Dave Chappelle & other essays. New York: Thunder's Mouth Press.
- — (2007). To the break of dawn : a freestyle on the hip hop aesthetic. New York: New York University Press.
- — (2010). The substance of hope : Barack Obama and the paradox of progress. New York: Walker.
- Cobb, Jelani & David Remnick, eds. (2021). The matter of Black lives : writing from the New Yorker. New York: Ecco.
- United States. National Advisory Commission on Civil Disorders (2021). Cobb, Jelani & Matthew Guariglia (eds.). The essential Kerner Commission report. New York: Liveright.
- Cobb, Jelani (2025). Three or more is a riot : notes on how we got here, 2012-2025. New York: One World.

=== Essays and reporting ===
- Cobb, Jelani (March 21, 2012). "Trayvon Martin and the parameters of hope". News Desk. The New Yorker. (Note: Available on website only.)
- — (September 1, 2014). "Bullets and ballots". The Talk of the Town. Comment. The New Yorker. 90 (25): 17–18.
- — (June 29, 2015). "Terrorism in Charleston". The Talk of the Town. Comment. The New Yorker. 91 (18): 17–18.
- — (April 25, 2016). "Working–class heroes". The Talk of the Town. Comment. The New Yorker. 92 (11): 33–34. (Note: Online version is titled "Learning to talk about class".)
- — (July 25, 2016). "Across the divide". The Talk of the Town. Comment. The New Yorker. 92 (22): 15–16. (Note: Online version is titled "Honoring the police and their victims".)
- — (October 10, 2016). "Millenialism". The Talk of the Town. Comment. The New Yorker. 92 (32): 33–34. (Note: Online version is titled "Hillary Clinton and the Millennial vote".)
- — (March 13, 2017). "A state away". The Talk of the Town. Comment. The New Yorker. 93 (4): 27–28. (Note: Online version is titled "Republicans and the Constitution".)
- — (April 24, 2017). "Reversal of justice". The Talk of the Town. Comment. The New Yorker. 93 (10): 35–36. (Note: Online version is titled "Will Jeff Sessions police the police?".)
- — (December 4, 2017). "A history of paranoia". The Talk of the Town. Comment. The New Yorker. 93 (39): 19–20. (Note: Online version is titled "The Trump Administration and Hoover-era paranoia".)
- — (May 8, 2017). "Out of time". The Talk of the Town. Comment. The New Yorker. 93 (12): 15–16. (Note: Online version is titled "The banal horror of Arkansas’s executions".)
- — (February 12–19, 2018). "State of the resistance". The Talk of the Town. Comment. The New Yorker. 94 (1): 27–28.
- — (July 27, 2020). "The matter of Black lives". The Political Scene. March 14, 2016. The New Yorker. 96 (21): 18–23. (Note: Originally published in the March 14, 2016 issue.)
- — (December 21, 2020). "Special Elections". The Talk of the Town. Comment. The New Yorker. 96 (41): 19, 22. (Note: Online version is titled "The high stakes of Georgia's Loeffler-Warnock Senate race".)
- — (March 1, 2021). "Assessing threats". The Talk of the Town. Comment. The New Yorker. 97 (2): 11, 14. (Note: Online version is titled "'Judas and the Black Messiah' and the Klan Act".)
- — (March 29, 2021). "The battle for Georgia". The Talk of the Town. Comment. The New Yorker. 97 (6): 15, 18. (Note: Online version is titled "The high cost of Georgia's restrictive voting bills".)
- — (September 20, 2021). "The limits of liberalism : how Derrick Bell's pioneering work gave rise to critical race theory". Annals of Equality. The New Yorker. 97 (29): 20–22, 24–26. (Note: Online version is titled "The man behind critical race theory".)
- — (February 6, 2023). "Historic battles". The Talk of the Town. Comment. The New Yorker. 98 (48): 11–12. (Note: Online version is titled "Ron DeSantis battles the African American A.P. Course—and history".)

———————

Bibliography notes
