= Jonathan Cowan =

Co-founder of Third Way (born 1965)

- Born: Jonathan J. Cowan
- Education: Dartmouth College
- Employer: Third Way
- Political party: Democratic
- Movement: Centrism in the United States

Jonathan J. Cowan is an American political consultant and think tank founder. A member of the Democratic Party, Cowan is the president and co-founder of Third Way, a self-described centrist think tank.

== Career ==
From 1989 to 1992, Cowan was Press Secretary and Legislative Assistant to Congressman Mel Levine (D-CA). Cowan then focused on political advocacy focused on the concept of "activist as social-change agent." With the bipartisan help of former U.S. senators Paul Tsongas (D-MA) and Warren Rudman (R-NH), Cowan co-founded, with Rob Nelson, the organization Lead...or Leave in 1992. The organization, with no paying members, was primarily funded by American businessman Pete Peterson. In 1994, Cowan and Nelson co-authored the book Revolution X: A Survival Guide for Our Generation.

During the second Clinton administration, Cowan served as Chief of Staff of the United States Department of Housing and Urban Development. During that presidency, Cowan also served as Senior Advisor to Secretary Andrew M. Cuomo and as Acting Assistant Secretary for Public Affairs under Secretary Henry Cisneros.

In 2000, Cowan became President of a new organization, Americans for Gun Safety. In 2005, Americans for Gun Safety was folded into the new, multi-issue think tank Third Way, which Cowan co-founded along with Matt Bennett, Jim Kessler, and Nancy Hale.
