= Bridgett M. Davis =

American writer, teacher and filmmaker

Bridgett M. Davis is an American writer, teacher and independent filmmaker. Her memoir The World According to Fannie Davis: My Mother's Life in the Detroit Numbers, was a New York Times Editors' Choice and was named a Best Book of 2019 by Kirkus Reviews. She is Professor of Journalism and the Writing Professions at Baruch College, City University of New York, where she teaches Creative, Film and Narrative Writing.

== Biography ==
Born and raised in Detroit, Michigan, Davis is a graduate of Spelman College in Atlanta and of Columbia University, where she received an MS in journalism. After taking a screenwriting course in 1991, she became increasing involved with film and screenwriting. Her feature film Naked Acts, about a young African-American actress who refuses to appear nude in a film, premiered in 1998 and has been widely screened internationally.

Her debut novel, Shifting through Neutral, was published in 2004. Her second novel, Into the Go-Slow, was chosen as a "best book of 2014" by outlets including Salon, The San Francisco Chronicle, BookRiot, Bustle and The Root.

She is also an essayist, and has written articles and reviews for many newspapers and journals. Among those in which her work has appeared are the Detroit Free Press, The Philadelphia Inquirer, New York Newsday, Chicago Tribune, Columbia Journalism Review, Black Film Review, Venue Literary Magazine, The Atlanta Journal-Constitution, and The Wall Street Journal, and she has contributed to books including In the Tradition: An Anthology of Young Black Writers, edited by Kevin Powell and Ras Baraka (1992); The Black Women's Health Book: Speaking for Ourselves, edited by Evelyn C. White (1994); and Skin Deep, Spirit Strong: The Black Female Body in American Culture, edited by Kimberly Gisele Wallace-Sanders (2002).

Davis has been the recipient of a Brooklyn Arts Council Award and a Thomas J. Watson Fellowship.

In 2019, she published her memoir The World According To Fannie Davis: My Mother's Life in the Detroit Numbers, which was a New York Times Editors' Choice, and was named a Best Book of 2019 by Kirkus Reviews and Real Simple. Written to honor her remarkable mother, who ran an illegal lottery operation out of her Detroit home so as to give her family a stable, middle-class life, the book was described by The New York Times critic Jennifer Szalai as "a daughter's gesture of loving defiance, an act of reclamation, an absorbing portrait of her mother in full", and Joshunda Sanders writing in Kirkus Reviews concluded a profile of the author by saying: "Fannie orients and centers a world where she risks everything to provide and demonstrate unconditional love for her family. Bridgett returns that love right back to her mother, unfettered from any hesitation or sense of lack. From the first word to the last, there is nothing in the book but adoration, reverence, and affection."

In 2025, Davis published her memoir Love, Rita, a tribute to her elder sister Rita and Black sisterhood.

== Bibliography ==
- —— (2004). Shifting Through Neutral (hardcover ed.). Amistad/HarperCollins. ISBN 9780060572495.
- —— (2014). Into the Go-Slow (paperback ed.). Feminist Press. ISBN 9781558618640.
- —— (2019). The World According to Fannie Davis (hardcover ed.). Little, Brown and Company. ISBN 9780316558730.
- —— (2025). Love, Rita (hardcover ed.). Harper/HarperCollins. ISBN 9780063322080.
