= Tony Cokes =

American artist (born 1956)

- Born: 1956 (age 69–70); Richmond, Virginia, U.S.
- Education: Goddard College; Virginia Commonwealth University (MFA)
- Occupations: Visual artist, educator

Tony Cokes (born 1956) is an American visual artist and educator.

== Early life and education ==
Cokes was born in Richmond, Virginia. He studied photography and creative writing at Goddard College, and received an MFA degree (1985) in sculpture from Virginia Commonwealth University.

== Art career ==
In 1995, Renee Cox, Fo Wilson, and Tony Cokes created the Negro Art Collective (NAC) to fight cultural misrepresentations about Black Americans.

=== Artwork ===
Cokes's artwork concerns popular culture and mass entertainment. In the 1990s, he was part of the band X-PRZ. His videos often take the form of essays in which Cokes displays fragments of found texts on brightly-colored backgrounds, set to popular music. They are essays with musical accompaniment. He is known to combine quotes from a range of texts from critical theory, cultural studies, art criticism, and news reports. His sources include Louis Althusser, Malcolm X, Public Enemy, and William Burroughs.

In 1988 Cokes used newsreel footage of the riots in urban black neighborhoods in the 1960s along with 80s industrial music and text commentary to create Black Celebration; a rebellion against the commodity. Cokes wrote that the intent of the piece was to introduce a reading that will contradict received ideas which characterize those riots as criminal or irrational. He has said he is fascinated by the problem of how violence is represented when people not the state enact it.

In this work Cokes juxtaposes the old news reel footage with written commentary from Morrisey, Guy Debord, Barbara Kruger, and Martin Gore. Cokes’ use of text alludes to the constructs of race in America and the economic challenges created by those constructs. One slide features a Guy Debord quote, “The theft of large refrigerators by people with no electricity or with their electricity cut off is the best image of the lie of affluence transformed into truth in play”. Soon after in the piece the Skinny Puppy soundtrack has echoing voices that mirror the empty shells of burned-out buildings. Cokes’ art is disturbing, haunting and capable of getting the viewer to question what they think they know.

William S. Smith says in Art In America, “Cokes’ working method enables him to respond to current events while continuing his longstanding investigation of race in popular culture”. Created in 1988 this video maintains a timelessness when viewed in the light of the Black Lives Matter movement and the most recent rounds of police perpetrated violence against the Black community. Cokes’ work highlights the dissonance of the media coverage of the ongoing movement for racial justice where protests remain framed as violent flare-ups, despite incidents being statistically few and far between. His work asks the viewer what is valid protest and to show that the line between protest and rioting is not a line at all but a continuum.

=== Teaching ===
Cokes teaches at Brown University and lives and works in Providence, Rhode Island. Cokes offered a virtual artist lecture at his alma mater, Virginia Commonwealth University on March 4, 2021.

=== Awards and honors ===
Cokes was named a 2024 MacArthur Fellow.

== Exhibitions ==
Cokes work has been exhibited at the Museum of Modern Art, the Whitney Museum of American Art, the Studio Museum in Harlem, the Long Beach Museum of Art, the Kitchen, and Artists Space. He was included in the 10th Berlin Biennale, and has shown at the Hessel Museum, Whitechapel Gallery, ZKM Karlsruhe, and Goldsmiths Center for Contemporary Art. Cokes is represented by Greene Naftali Gallery in New York. Cokes was included in a 2019 exhibition at The Shed. Recent solo exhibitions include CIRCA, London (2021); Museu d’Art Contemporani de Barcelona, Barcelona (2020); ARGOS center for audiovisual arts, Brussels (2020), Memorial Art Gallery, Rochester (2021).
