= Naked Acts =

1996 film by Bridgett M. Davis

- Directed by: Bridgett M. Davis
- Written by: Bridgett M. Davis
- Starring: Jake-Ann Jones; Stephanie Berry; Patricia DeArcy; John McKie; Ron Cephas Jones; Renee Cox
- Release date: 1996
- Running time: 87 minutes
- Country: United States
- Language: English

Naked Acts is a 1996 American drama film written and directed by Bridgett M. Davis.

== Synopsis ==
A young actress who just landed a part in her first movie. However it requires her to perform a nude scene, which she does not want to do due to an insecurity stemming from her mother's career in Blaxploitation films.

== Cast ==
- Jake-Ann Jones as Cicely
- Patricia DeArcy as Lydia Love
- John McKie as Marcel Brown
- Ron Cephas Jones as Joel
- Renee Cox as Diana

== Release ==
The film had trouble finding a distributor when it was first made, so director Bridgett M. Davis distributed it herself. It would later see a distribution via Milestone films and Kino Lorber. The movie was released on Blu-ray Feb 18, 2025.

== Reception ==
Unpon the re-release Richard Brody of the New Yorker praised the movies themes, saying "it boldly embodies grand archetypes and underexplored legacies of Black cinema". It was included in the 2001 book The 50 Most Influential Black Films by S. Torriano Berry.
