= Kenji Jasper =

American writer and journalist

- Born: 1975 (age 50–51); Washington, D.C., U.S.
- Education: Morehouse College
- Occupations: Writer, journalist

Kenji Jasper (born 1975) is an American writer and journalist. He has worked in writing and journalism for over 20 years.

== Early life and career, and education ==
Kenji Jasper was born in 1975 and was raised in Fairfax Village in southeast Washington, D.C. He attended Thomas Jefferson Middle School and Benjamin Banneker Academic High School.

His career begin with an article as an intern for The Washington Informer newspaper at the age of 13. A year later at age 14, he became a contributor to Black Entertainment Television's YSB magazine, and later worked as a writer and instructor at The Institute for the Preservation and Study of African American Writing. He also served as an on-air personality for WTTG Fox 5's Newsbag (1986 to 1987), and later as one of the founding cast members of Black Entertainment Television's Teen Summit (1989 to 1993).

Jasper got a degree from Morehouse College in 1997. By the time he graduated from college, his journalism had appeared in VIBE, Essence, The Village Voice, Upscale, The Charlotte Observer, The San Diego Union Tribune, and The Atlanta Tribune.

== Career ==
He wrote his first novel, Dark, at the age of 21. It has since been released in the United Kingdom and translated into French. It was later optioned to be made into a film by State Street Pictures (Soul Food, Barbershop, Roll Bounce) and Fox Searchlight Pictures.

His second novel, Dakota Grand, was published in September 2002 and was praised by Publishers Weekly, VIBE, Essence, The Chicago Sun-Times and Africana.com. His third novel, Seeking Salamanca Mitchell, was published in July 2004.The House on Childress Street, a memoir about his maternal grandfather, grandmother and their children, was published in 2005. He co-edited and contributed to Beats, Rhymes and Life: What We Love and Hate About Hip-Hop, a critical collection anthology of critical writings on hip-hop culture, co-edited by Ytasha Womack, which was published by Harlem Moon Books in 2007. Jasper's fourth novel, Snow, was published in 2007 by VIBE Books.

Jasper has contributed articles and essays to National Public Radio, The Village Voice, VIBE, The Charlotte Observer, The Chicago Sun-Times and Essence among many other publications. In the early 2000s he was co-editing Beats, Rhymes and Life, a collection of critical writings on hip-hop culture, with writer and director Ytasha Womack, for publication in May 2007. He was also the CEO and Editor of The Armory, a publishing partnership with Akashic Books. Its first release, Got by first-time author D, was published in 2007. Jasper published The House on Childress Street in January 2006.

== Publications ==
- Jasper, Kenji (2001). Dark: A Novel. New York: Broadway Books. ISBN 0-7679-0707-8. OCLC 45015214.
- Jasper, Kenji (2004). "Thursday". Brooklyn Noir. Akashic Books. ISBN 978-1-936070-15-2. OCLC 591313101.
- Jasper, Kenji (2004). Seeking Salamanca Mitchell: A Novel. New York: Broadway Books. ISBN 0-7679-1675-1. OCLC 53971774.
- Jasper, Kenji (2005). The House on Childress Street: A Memoir. New York: Harlem Moon/Broadway Books. ISBN 0-7679-1679-4. OCLC 60767097.
- Jasper, Kenji (2007). Snow. New York: Vibe. ISBN 978-1-60183-001-2. OCLC 85446145.
- Jasper, Kenji (2017). "A Moment of Clarity at the Waffle House". In Jones, Tayari (ed.). Atlanta Noir. Akashic Books. ISBN 978-1-61775-559-0. OCLC 999316153. Nominated as the year's best short story by Mystery Writers of America.
- Jasper, Kenji (2018). Nostrand Avenue. New York: Dafina. ISBN 978-1-4967-1569-2. OCLC 1014035650.
