= Kwame Holman =

American TV producer

Kwame Holman is a retired American producer and correspondent associated with the PBS NewsHour, as a producer and reporter for WTOC in Georgia, and, who also has held positions with several national organizations, including the American Civil Liberties Union, and local government administrations.

== Professional career ==
In 1983, Holman joined The MacNeil/Lehrer NewsHour, later renamed the PBS NewsHour, serving as a producer, correspondent, and congressional correspondent. During his career at the NewsHour, Holman was awarded a George Polk Award for National Television Reporting for his reporting on violence and abortion clinics and an Emmy Award for his reporting on the national farm crisis, both are national awards for journalistic excellence. On January 13, 1995, he was featured as a guest on the C-SPAN interview program, Washington Journal. He retired from the NewsHour in 2014. Prior to joining the NewsHour, he was associated with the CBS affiliate, WTOC in Savannah, Georgia.

Holman also served as public relations consultant to the National Summit Conference on Black Economic Development as well as serving as a special assistant to the president of the Children’s Defense Fund. He served as the acting press secretary to the mayor of Washington, D.C. during 1980.

== Personal life ==
He is one of three siblings born to Mariella Ukina Ama and M. Carl Holman. He is a graduate of the Medill School of Journalism at Northwestern University. Holman has been married twice and has two children.
