= Third Way (American think tank) =

Centrist nonprofit organization in Washington, D.C.

- Founded: 2005; 21 years ago
- Founders: Jonathan Cowan; Matt Bennett; Nancy Hale; Jim Kessler
- Tax ID no.: 20-1734070
- Legal status: 501(c)(4)
- Headquarters: Washington, D.C., United States
- Coordinates: 38.903358°N 77.039347°W
- President: Jonathan Cowan
- Chairman, Board of Trustees: John L. Vogelstein
- Subsidiaries: Third Way Institute
- Revenue: $10,405,228 (2016)
- Expenses: $8,704,498 (2016)
- Employees: 71 (2016)
- Volunteers: 32 (2016)
- Website: thirdway.org

Third Way is a Washington, D.C.–based public policy think tank founded in 2005. It develops and advocates for policies that it says represent "modern center-left ideas". It is described as a centrist or neoliberal think tank for moderate Democrats.

The think tank's supporters and advocates include like-minded Democratic Party politicians, think tanks, and individual donors. Third Way's funding also partially comes from philanthropy, foundations, and personal donations. Since its founding, Third Way has been directly involved in policy issues such as the benefits of energy innovation, student accountability measures under the Every Student Succeeds Act, deficit reduction, proposals to reform Medicare and Medicaid, the repeal of "Don't ask, don't tell", and new trade accords with Colombia, South Korea, and Panama.

== History ==
Third Way grew out of the nonprofit group Americans for Gun Safety (AGS), which was formed in 2000 with the objective of resetting the gun control movement and advancing gun safety laws, using moderate ideas that appealed to both sides of the debate. AGS' primary political project was closing the gun show loophole, through which people could purchase guns at gun shows without needing a background check, by passing the Brady Handgun Violence Prevention Act. It helped pass two 2000 state-level ballot initiatives in Colorado and Oregon to close the gun show loophole there and attempted to pass federal legislation carried by Senators John McCain (R-AZ) and Joe Lieberman (D-CT), which failed to become law. AGS was folded into Third Way in 2005 in the wake of the 2004 U.S. presidential election as a policy, messaging, and strategy idea center and think tank. Third Way was co-founded by Jonathan Cowan, Matt Bennett, Jim Kessler, and Nancy Hale.

Third Way led efforts to suppress third-party candidates or groups who support them and their ballot access for the 2024 U.S. presidential election. The call included plans to threaten donors and potential candidates of repercussions should they get involved with or support third party groups or candidates seeking ballot access. Michael Scherer, a national political reporter at The Washington Post, wrote that No Labels, a third party group preparing a potential third-party candidate for the 2024 presidential ticket, asked the U.S. Department of Justice to investigate potential criminal charges related to these suppression efforts by Third Way and other groups. On February 16, 2024, Third Way sent letters to the Secretaries of State of Arizona, Georgia, and Michigan urging them to prevent American Values 2024, a Super PAC, from collecting signatures on behalf of Robert F. Kennedy Jr. The letters were accompanied by a legal memorandum prepared by Elias Law Group, the law firm of long-time Democratic Party lawyer Marc Elias.

In March 2024, NBC News reported that Third Way was serving as the "hub" for an "anti-third party coalition" targeting No Labels and other independent candidates, including Kennedy. Alex Seitz-Wald, a senior NBC News political reporter, wrote an in-depth article on the secret recruiting tactics utilized by Third Way to build an anti-No Labels coalition. This included "working the Democratic side of the aisle after securing the blessing of party leaders in the White House, on Capitol Hill and in the Democratic National Committee", with the goal of making it "impossible" for No Labels to deliver on the bipartisan ticket it promised for its 2024 presidential bid. In November 2024, The Washington Post reported details on the tactics used to keep No Labels off the ballot, as revealed in emails between anti-No Labels coalition operatives and obtained during a courtroom battle on the matter. Tactics included mounting "a pressure campaign" to deter candidates from joining the No Labels ticket; committing a trademark violation by setting up a fake website to deceive voters about No Labels positions; seeking out first hand sources within No Labels to leak private information to reporters; and successfully "hijacking their ballot line" with extremist candidates to "muddy the No Labels brand".

In August 2026, Third Way launched a $15 million dollar effort to defeat candidates aligned with the Democratic Socialists of America, following a slew of electoral victories in Democratic primaries.

== Policy areas ==
Third Way's work covers seven policy areas: climate and energy, economy, education, healthcare, national security, politics, and social policy. In the climate policy area, Third Way advocates for nuclear power and other sustainable energy alternatives. In the economic policy, Third Way advocates for infrastructure development and tax reform. In education, Third Way focuses on addressing what they see as issues in both K–12 and higher education. Protecting and improving the Affordable Care Act is Third Way's aim regarding healthcare. Third Way also seeks to develop electoral strategies for the broader left and advocates for socially liberal policies such as abortion rights, same-sex marriage, and the legalization of marijuana.

== Policy work ==
In 2010, Third Way sponsored a report written by William Galston of the Brookings Institution and Elaine Kamarck of Harvard Kennedy School titled "Change You Can Believe In Needs a Government You Can Trust". The report analyzed Americans' trust in government and reported it was in serious decline, possibly presenting significant challenges to the Obama administration's agenda. Third Way's other economic work has included rural reinvestment efforts, a plan to make opportunity more widely available to American middle class and defending the Affordable Care Act. As an example of Third Way's rural reinvestment program, Third Way developed the policies framed in Spurring Weatherization Investments in Rural America, which was introduced by Representative Jim Clyburn (D-South Carolina) and Senator Lindsey Graham (R-South Carolina) as the Rural Energy Savings Program. Third Way argued for members of opposing parties to sit together at the President's annual address in 2011 and 2012.

Third Way worked on a campaign to evaluate the Democratic Party connection with voters after the 2016 U.S. presidential election. The report found a drop-off in support among voters of color, concluding they are persuasion voters needing a compelling economic narrative, and that Republican efforts to brand Democrats as radicals worked—including with minority voters. Along those lines, Third Way hosted consultations and meetings with politicians and strategists from around the country to develop a Democratic strategy for winning the 2018 midterm elections and the 2020 U.S. presidential election. As of 2017, Third Way's economic program was undertaking a campaign to highlight the scarcity of opportunity as a root cause of income inequality in the United States.

In March 2018, Third Way released a report outlining a new cause for the Democratic Party and several policy ideas that the organization says "redefines government's role in expanding the opportunity to earn". The Washington Post's coverage of the report considered it "an opening bid in the 2020 'ideas primary'". Other parts of Third Way's work are also related to politics, including their study of the battleground states and districts that determined congressional majorities in 2018. In addition, their public opinion research and focus groups revealed that persuadable voters, who backed Barack Obama and then Donald Trump, saw Trump as focused on creating jobs and Democrats as "working for someone else". In the University of Pennsylvania's "2019 Global Go To Think Tanks Report", the Third Way was ranked 19th for Best New Idea or Paradigm Developed by a Think Tank, 49th among Think Tanks with the Most Significant Impact on Public Policy, 60th among Top Think Tanks in the United States, 82nd for Best Advocacy Campaign, and 93rd among Social Policy Think Tanks worldwide.

In its review of the 2016 and 2020 elections, authored alongside The Collective PAC and Latino Victory Fund, Third Way called for the Democratic Party to focus on becoming the Jobs Party to voters. In what The New York Times called "perhaps the most thorough soul-searching done by either party this year", Third Way's 2021 report rang the alarm bells for Democrats that the party's core economic and diverse message was falling flat next to Republican misinformation prior to 2022. Not long after, Third Way, in partnership with the National Urban League, launched the Alliance for Entrepreneurial Equity in 2021. The initiative is dedicated to leveling the playing field for people of color and women entrepreneurs, and pushing for federal action to that effect. The Alliance has released reports that highlight the gaps in wealth creation for minorities. In Fortune, the National Urban League president Marc Morial and the Third Way president Jon Cowan released a joint op-ed highlighting discrepancies. For example, they wrote: "If Black-owned businesses were proportionate to the population, there would be 738,000 more Black-owned businesses, seven million more jobs at Black-owned businesses, and $733 billion more in sales and revenue from Black-owned businesses. If Hispanic-owned businesses were proportionate to population, there would be 885,000 more Hispanic-owned businesses, 7.5 million more jobs at Hispanic-owned businesses, and $1.2 trillion more in sales and revenue from Hispanic-owned businesses."

== Criticism ==
=== Special interests ===
The majority of the think tank's funding comes from individuals with close ties to the banking industry and its board of trustees consists mostly of investment bankers. Political commentator and Bernie Sanders campaign official David Sirota suggested that the think tank's initiatives to combat Social Security expansion despite popular sentiment is because it would cause trustees of the think tank to pay higher taxes. Hunter of Daily Kos suggested Third Way's ties to the banking industry is the reason for its opposition to Senator Elizabeth Warren's platform of Wall Street reform. Investigative journalist Lee Fang of The Nation alleges the think tank's ties to the Democratic Party are "tenuous" and that it exists to serve as a vehicle for corporate and right-wing interests to shape the economic policies of the party. Writing in The Intercept, Akela Lacy describes Third Way as a "center-left, corporate and GOP donor-funded nonprofit", which advocates for neoliberal policies and is staunchly opposed to Medicare for All. The socialist magazine Jacobin described Third Way as reflecting "the turning point in which... parties abandoned their traditional tenets and working-class constituencies in favor of... Margaret Thatcher and Ronald Reagan."

In an editorial for Town Hall, consultant Matt Mackowiak alleges that Third Way has been violating tax laws by both accepting tax-deductible gifts and at the same time engaging in political activity, which taken together, is prohibited by the IRS. The editorial cites a piece by IRS agent Ryan Ellis in The Washington Examiner who examined the organization's tax filings.

=== Allegations of invalid research ===
In 2017, the Third Way think tank conducted a listening tour in rural Wisconsin as part of its research to understand the results of the 2016 U.S. presidential election. This tour was the focus of an article in The Atlantic, where reporter Molly Ball observed many focus group participants expressing strongly politically partisan views that challenged Third Way's ideology that political partisanship was not most people's primary concern. Ball recounted hearing focus group participants blame things like government bureaucracy, changes in society and the family, young people, welfare recipients, Muslims, Republicans, Democrats, income inequality, gerrymandering, and union rights for their problems. Despite this, Ball wrote that Third Way summarized its findings in a short report, which ignored all the sentiments heard on the tour which challenged Third Way's ideology and instead selectively highlighted sentiments which adhered to Third Way's ideology.

Third Way strongly disputed Ball's claim in a public post. Third Way's Matt Bennett wrote in response: "We are dismayed that in the story, Molly writes that we omitted information that is actually in the report. ... Yes, in the last page of the report, we provide some evidence that people believe they can still work together. But nowhere in the report do we even imply that means they think politicians should support a centrist policy agenda. ... Moreover, this research is, by its very nature, anecdotal. It is about impressions, which can vary widely, not quantitative data, which can be extrapolated. We make that very clear in the project description and in all the reports on our visits, each of which have been quite different from the rest."

== See also ==
- Democratic Leadership Council
- New Democrat Network
- New Labour
- Think tank
- Third Way
- Third Way in the United States
