= Norman Teague =

American designer and educator

- Teague at the Obama Presidential Center, 2026
- Born: 1968 (age 57–58)
- Education: Columbia College Chicago; School of the Art Institute of Chicago
- Occupations: Social practice artist; designer; furniture maker; sculptor; educator
- Website: normanteaguedesignstudios.com

Norman Teague (born 1968) is an American social practice artist, designer, furniture maker, and educator. Teague co-founded the Chicago-based design studio, blkHaUs Studios, and in 2019 went on to form his own Norman Teague Design Studios. In addition to his studio practices Teague currently resides as a professor in the school of industrial design at University of Illinois Chicago.

== Early life and education ==
Teague grew up on the South Side of Chicago in Bronzeville, and he is African American.

Originally interested in pursuing a career in architecture, Teague attended Harold Washington College. He went to further his studies at Columbia College Chicago, but after exposure to wood shop and smaller scale design he pivoted his focus to industrial Design. Teague received an BA degree in product design from Columbia College Chicago in 2014. He then went on to pursue a master's degree in designed objects from The School of the Art Institute of Chicago, which he received in 2016.

== Career ==
In 2016, Teague co-founded with Fo Wilson the design studio blkHaUs Studios in Chicago. Their work was focused on making public spaces in Chicago more inviting for the public.

In 2019, he went on to form his own Norman Teague Design Studios. Teague's work seeks to use design to "empower brown and black communities". In 2023, Norman Teague was invited to participate in the Venice Architectural Biennale, by US Pavilion curatorial team, Tizziana Balden-ebro and Lauren Leving for the Everlasting Plastic installation. He's installation was titled: Re+Prise playing on the words of reprise and repetition. Leslie Lokko, was appointed the director, her theme focused on The Laboratory of the Future. Teague's has also exhibited Re+Prise at Carnegie Museum of Art in 2024. Lokko is a Ghanaian-Scottish architect, academic and writer.

He is best known for his furniture, some of which resides in the museum collection of The Art Institute of Chicago, and the Los Angeles County Museum of Art (LACMA). He has also worked in performance art, installation art, and sculpture. Teague has worked with notable collaborators such as Theaster Gates, and acted as a consultant on The Barack Obama Presidential Center with the firm Ralph Applebaum. On April 9, 2026, the Obama Foundation announced that it had commissioned Teague to create eight wooden benches for the Obama Presidential Center, each carved from solid walnut.

His work was in the 2021 Chicago Architecture Biennial.

In 2024, Teague's Museum of Modern Art (MoMA) exhibition in New York, Designer’s Choice: Norman Teague—Jam Sessions contrasted pieces from the museum's collection with "reimaginings [...] assisted by generative AI" through which the designer "offers a reinterpretation of design history."

For the 2025 exhibition Pirouette: Turning Points in Design at MoMA, Teague was invited by Paola Antonelli to present "C" for Chair at a special Abecedarium where "Twenty-six designers, scholars, DJs, photographers, and entrepreneurs [...] each present[ed] on one paradigm-shifting object or idea, each corresponding to one letter of the alphabet."

== Publications ==
- Teague, Norman (2026). "Making it Plain". The Product Design 100. By Philpott, Alex; Pardo, Benjamin; Didero, Maria Cristina. Philpott, Alex; Pearce, Oscar; Page, Kester; Slatter, Joe (eds.). London: Design Burger. pp. 48–52. ISBN 978-1-0369-5572-4.
