= George E. Curry =

American journalist

George Curry in an undated photo

George Edward Curry (February 23, 1947 – August 20, 2016) was an American journalist. Curry was considered the "dean of black press columnists", and his weekly commentaries enjoyed wide syndication. He died of heart failure on August 20, 2016.

== Early life ==
George E. Curry was born February 23, 1947, in Tuscaloosa, Alabama, to Martha Brownlee and Homer Lee Curry. His mother was a domestic worker and his father was a mechanic. George Curry attended Druid High School. After graduating high school, he attended Knoxville College in Tennessee. He was the quarterback and co-captain of the football team, served on the school board of trustees, and served as the editor of the school paper for the sport section. He studied at Yale and Harvard University during two summers while still attending Knoxville College.

== Career life ==
During his early life Curry worked for Sports Illustrated and St. Louis Post-Dispatch. His first year at the St. Louis Post-Dispatch he had twenty-five stories on the front page. In 1983 he joined the Chicago Tribune where he focused on the interest of the African American community. In 1984 he covered the presidential campaign that included Jessie Jackson and the vice-presidential campaigns of Geraldine Ferraro and George H. W. Bush. The second presidential campaign he covered was in 1992 with Bill Clinton and the vice-presidential campaign of Al Gore. In 1993 Curry published a bold depiction of U.S. Supreme Court Justice Clarence Thomas with an Aunt Jemima handkerchief on his head on the front cover. He served as New York bureau chief as a Washington correspondent. He also served as chief correspondent of Assault of Affirmative Action, a television documentary. In May 1996, Curry published a 17-page cover story entitled, "Kemba's Nightmare." It was about a girl who had been sentenced to 24 years in prison for a minor drug incident. President Clinton pardoned her in 2000 after hearing and talking with Curry. In 1999 he delivered the commencement address at Kentucky State University. From 1993 to 2000 he was editor-in-chief of Emerge. This magazine won over 40 national journalism awards while under Curry's leadership. His work with NNPA ranged from hearing oral arguments in the Supreme Court to visiting Doha, Qatar, to write about the war with Iraq. During the fall of Baghdad he got the first exclusive interview with General Vincent Brooks. Curry was the past president of the American Society of Magazine Editors. In 2001 he became the editor-in-chief of the National Newspaper Publishers Association News Service in Washington, D.C. The column he wrote weekly for NNPA is published to more than 200 African-American newspapers. On March 15, 2007, Curry announced that he was going to resign as editor-in-chief of NNPA's news service. He delivered the George E. Kent Lecture, an annual speech. He was invited by the Organization of Black Students. Curry was the founding director of the St. Louis Minority Journalism Workshop and of the Washington Association of Black Journalists. He was a trustee on many boards, including: Knoxville College, the Kemba N. Smith Foundation, St. Paul Saturdays, and Young D.C.

== Recognition ==
George E. Curry appeared on the following television shows: PBS, CBS Evening News, ABC's World News Tonight, NBC's The Today Show, 20/20, Good Morning America, CNN, C-Span, BET, Fox Network News, MSNBC and ESPN. He traveled across the world to places such as: Rome (with the Rev. Jessie Jackson to see Pope John Paul II), Germany, Egypt, England, France, Cuba, Ghana, Nigeria, Mexico, Canada, and Italy. Curry is listed in Who's Who in America, Who's Who Among Black Americans, and Outstanding Young Men of America.

== Awards ==
- Named Journalist of the Year by the Washington Association of Black Journalists, 1995
- National Urban Coalition award, 1982
- "Excellence in Journalism" from Greater St. Louis Association of Black Journalists, 1982
- Journalist of the Year by the National Association of Black Journalists, 2003
- Doctor of Humane Letters degree from Kentucky State University
- Honorary Doctorate from Lane College
- Missouri Honor Medal for Distinguished Service in Journalism from the University of Missouri (highest honor the School of Journalism gives out)
