= Rob Nelson (talk show host) =

American television personality and author (born 1964)

- Born: October 9, 1964 (age 62); Milwaukee, Wisconsin, United States
- Occupations: Filmmaker, television personality, author, radio host, political activist

Rob Nelson (born October 9, 1964, in Milwaukee, Wisconsin) is an American television personality, author, radio host, political activist and filmmaker. From 2002 to 2003, he hosted The Rob Nelson Show.

== Career ==
=== Films ===
In 2014, Nelson was the executive producer of the short film Wish Wizard featuring Morgan Freeman. The film was made in conjunction with the Make-A-Wish Foundation to fulfill the wishes of 4 children with terminal diseases who wanted to be part of making a movie.

In December 2015, Nelson completed directing and producing his first documentary feature film, Magnificent Burden, which tells the story of a woman's quest to save her adopted son from a rare and deadly disease, Spinal muscular atrophy (SMA).

=== Television ===
After graduating from Stanford Law School and holding an externship in the Clinton White House, Nelson went on to become a television and radio show host. Nelson has been the host of a number of television programs including The Full Nelson on Fox News, which TV Guide called "a new breed of late night talk show", The Rob Nelson Show and ABC's The Scholar. Nelson also hosted one of the first Internet political talk shows, In Bed with Rob Nelson, on now defunct Television.com, an early web based content network launched by E! Entertainment Television founder Larry Namer.

== Political activism ==
Nelson first became nationally known for being one of the founders of Lead or Leave a political action group that focused on reducing the deficit and fighting for generational equity. Lead or Leave garnered national attention with an accountability pledge that asked the President and all members of Congress to pledge to cut the federal deficit in half in four years or leave office. Led by Nelson and Jonathan Cowan, the "mini-movement" became so prominent it was featured on 60 Minutes, Nightline, Good Morning America and The Today Show, creating a stir in "MTV-DC" during the Clinton years.

They mobilized thousands of young Americans, and in the process gained the support of numerous national political and business leaders, including billionaire and former independent presidential candidate Ross Perot, prominent investment banker Peter G. Peterson, Chicago commodity broker Richard Dennis, and former Senator and Democratic presidential candidate Paul Tsongas. In February, 1993, Cowan and Nelson were featured on the cover of U.S. News & World Report with the headline "The Twentysomething Rebellion - How It Will Change America". Nelson was once described by The New York Times as "one of the original Generation X spokesmen". The Times also noted "Mr. Nelson's patron is Roger Ailes, the former Republican political strategist who is now chairman and chief executive of Fox News Channel."

== Books ==
- Nelson, Rob., Cowan, Jonathan (1994). Revolution X: A Survival Guide for Our Generation. Penguin Books. ISBN 0140235329.
- Nelson, Rob (2000). Last Call: Ten Commonsense Solutions to America's Biggest Problems. Random House. ISBN 0440509033.
