= Penn State College of Arts and Architecture =

College of Pennsylvania State University

- Type: Public
- Established: 1963
- Dean: B Stephen Carpenter II
- Location: University Park, Pennsylvania, U.S. 40.802498°N 77.864876°W
- Campus: Suburban
- Website: artsandarchitecture.psu.edu

The College of Arts and Architecture is one of fourteen academic colleges at the University Park campus of The Pennsylvania State University.

== History ==
Under Eric Walker, twelfth president of Penn State, the University system experienced a revival in the importance of the humanities and fine arts, which culminated in the creation of the College of Arts and Architecture by action of the Board of Trustees in 1962. The College was formed by joining the School of Fine and Applied Arts, formerly within the College of the Liberal Arts, with the Department of Architecture, formerly within the College of Engineering. Jules Heller, then the director of the School of Fine and Applied Arts, was named the founding Dean of the College and was a founding member of the International Council of Fine Arts Deans (ICFAD).

== Composition ==
=== Schools and departments ===
- Department of Art History
- H. Campbell and Eleanor R. Stuckeman School of Architecture and Landscape Architecture
- Department of Architecture
- Department of Landscape Architecture
- Department of Graphic Design
- School of Music
- School of Theatre
- School of Visual Arts

=== Outreach programs ===
In addition to its academic mission, the Penn State and greater State College area is supported by cultural outreach programs administered by the College:

- Center for the Performing Arts
  - The Center for the Performing Arts is the successor to the Penn State Artists Series, founded in 1957 to present a variety of artistic performances on Penn State's campus. The Center hosts a series of musical and theatrical events annually.
- Palmer Museum of Art
  - The Palmer Museum of Art, opened in University Park in 1972, hosts a permanent collection of approximately 8,200 works, in addition to periodic rotating exhibitions and educational programs.
- Penn State Centre Stage
  - Penn State Centre Stage is the professional arm of the School of Theatre and has its origins in the late 1950s, when theatre department head (and, later, second Dean of the College) Walter H. Walters established a program for current students and professionals to present plays at the on-campus theatre, the Pavilion.
- Penn's Woods Music Festival
  - The Penn's Woods Music Festival (or Music at Penn's Woods) was established in 1986 to present a summer professional orchestral and chamber music festival organized by the School of Music.

== List of deans of the College of Arts and Architecture ==
Source: Penn State

Tenure	Name
1963 - 1968	Jules Heller
1969 - 1982	Walter H. Walters
1982 - 1983	William J. McHale (acting)
1983 - 1986	Robert W. Holmes
1986 - 1987	Raniero Corbeletti (acting)
1987 - 1993	James C. Moeser
1993 - 1994	Lyle C. Merriman (acting)
1994 - 2000	Neil H. Porterfield
2000 - 2007	Richard W. Durst
2007 - 2019	Barbara O. Korner
2020 -	B. Stephen Carpenter II
