= Yo Mama's Last Supper =

1996 photomontage by Renée Cox

Yo Mama's Last Supper, 1996

Yo Mama's Last Supper is a work of art created by Jamaican-American artist Renée Cox in 1996. It is a large photographic montage of five panels, each 31 inches square, depicting photographs of 11 black men, a white Judas and a naked black woman (the artist's self-portrait) posed in imitation of Leonardo da Vinci's 1490s painting The Last Supper. Cox is pictured naked and standing, with her arms reaching upwards, as Jesus.

In 2001, the piece was exhibited at the Brooklyn Museum of Art as part of an exhibition called Committed to the Image: Contemporary Black Photographers. New York City Mayor Rudy Giuliani was offended by the work and called for the creation of a panel to create decency standards for all art shown at publicly funded museums in the city. Art scholar Camille Paglia, however, said in 2012 that "Renée Cox is an important black photographer and a performance artist, who uses herself... This, I think, is a serious statement, this work. It might be shocking to have a nude black woman in the position of Christ, but I think, as a whole, the work had some dignity, it had gravitas."

The work has also been included in other exhibitions about artistic depictions of The Last Supper, in locations such as the Aldrich Contemporary Art Museum in Ridgefield, Connecticut; Oratorio di San Ludovico, a 17th-century Catholic church in Venice, Italy; and a gallery in Jakarta, Indonesia.

== Bibliography ==
- S. Brent Plate, Blasphemy: Art that Offends, Black Dog Publishing, London, 2006. ISBN 978-1904772538
- Francesca Bonazzoli, Michele Robecchi, Mona Lisa to Marge: How the World's Greatest Artworks Entered Popular Culture, Prestel, New York, 2014. ISBN 978-3791348773
