= Robert Miller (art dealer) =

American art dealer (1939-2011)

- Born: April 17, 1939; Atlantic City, New Jersey, U.S.
- Died: June 22, 2011 (aged 72); El Portal, Florida, U.S.
- Education: Rutgers University
- Occupation: Art dealer

Robert Miller (April 17, 1939 – June 22, 2011) was an American art dealer.

Miller was born in Atlantic City, New Jersey in 1939. After an MFA from Rutgers University in 1963, he began his career in New York City as an artist; but by 1966 gave that up to become an art dealer. He worked for twelve years as an assistant to the art dealer André Emmerich. In 1977 he opened his own gallery on Fifth Avenue in New York City with his wife, Betsy Wittenborn Miller; it later moved to the Fuller Building on East 57th Street, and then to 26th Street in Chelsea, Manhattan. He showed work by the artists Louise Bourgeois, Lee Krasner, Joan Mitchell and Alice Neel, and by photographers such as Jan Groover, Robert Mapplethorpe, Diane Arbus, and Bruce Weber.

He retired in 2002, and died on June 22, 2011, aged 72, at his home in El Portal, Florida, from an infection. Patti Smith reflecting on her friend Robert Mapplethorpe thought Miller was a mentor to him.
