= Lead or Leave =

American political action group

- Formation: 1992
- Founders: Rob Nelson, Jonathan Cowan
- Dissolved: 1995
- Type: Political action group
- Headquarters: United States

Lead or Leave (also known as Lead... or Leave) was an American grassroots political action group from 1992 to 1995. Led by Rob Nelson and Jonathan Cowan, it focused on reducing the deficit and fighting for generational equity. Lead or Leave garnered national attention with an accountability pledge that asked the President and all members of Congress to pledge to cut the federal deficit in half in four years or leave office. The "mini-movement" became so prominent it was featured on 60 Minutes, Nightline, Good Morning America and The Today Show, creating a stir in "MTV-DC" during the Clinton years.

They mobilized thousands of young Americans, and in the process gained the support of numerous national political and business leaders, including billionaire and former independent presidential candidate Ross Perot, prominent investment banker Peter G. Peterson, Chicago commodity broker Richard Dennis, and former senator and Democratic presidential candidate Paul Tsongas. In February, 1993, Cowan and Nelson were featured on the cover of U.S. News & World Report with the headline, "The Twentysomething Rebellion – How It Will Change America." Nelson has been described by The New York Times as "one of the original Generation X spokesmen."
