= Emerge (magazine) =

Defunct news magazine

- Categories: News magazine
- Frequency: Monthly
- Circulation: 170,000 (2000)
- First issue: September 1989
- Final issue: June 2000
- Country: United States
- Based in: Washington, D.C.
- ISSN: 0899-1154

Emerge was a monthly news magazine that was published from 1989 to 2000. Its primary focus was on issues of interest to African Americans. In 2000, Time said Emerge was "the nation's best black newsmagazine for the past seven years" the St. Louis Post-Dispatch described it as "the premier source for intellectual discussion on issues affecting African-Americans", and the New York Amsterdam News wrote that "it had no rival for cutting edge news for and about the black community". The magazine was headquartered in Washington, D.C.

== History ==
Wilmer C. Ames had the idea for Emerge, which he envisioned as a general interest magazine for upwardly mobile African Americans. He was the majority owner of Emerge Communications, the magazine's publishing company. Time Inc. owned 19.5 percent of the company and other investors, including Black Entertainment Television (BET), together held 29.5 percent. Ames planned to publish the first issue of Emerge in October 1988 with an initial circulation of 150,000. Publication was delayed when one of the investors failed to produce the funds it had promised.

The magazine launched instead in September 1989. In its first issue, Ames described Emerge's target audience: "As the collective effort of the Civil Rights Movement dissolved legal racial barriers, sustained individual efforts have resulted in a growing list of 'firsts' in achievement as black professionals have pushed to new heights and into new fields.... Emerge is a magazine designed to meet the needs of this new, affluent generation, a generation that assumes different kinds of responsibilities along with the new opportunities and freedoms it enjoys." The Los Angeles Times noted that Emerge was competing against "stalwart publications" that already served the black middle class, such as Ebony, Essence, Jet, and Black Enterprise. Ames told the Los Angeles Times he hoped Emerge would "complement", rather than replace, those magazines.

At the end of its first year of publication, USA Today wrote that Emerge had a paid circulation of 105,000, with 50,000 issues distributed free to members of black professional organizations and fraternities—"although not the same 50,000 each month". The magazine's publisher, Donald Anderson, said that about 30 percent of those who received free copies went on to subscribe. USA Today described the readers of Emerge as "the underserved upper-middle class segment of the audience, the Cliff and Claire Huxtables", referring to the affluent couple from The Cosby Show. Emerge's readers had a median age of 45 and an average annual household income of $71,000. More than three-quarters owned their homes, 86 percent had attended or graduated from college, and 45 percent had post-graduate degrees.

In May 1991, BET bought Time's stake in Emerge Communications. Although the terms of the deal were not announced, Time said it had made a profit on its $1.5 million investment. After the transaction, BET owned "close to 70 percent of the magazine".

Ames died in 1992, and George E. Curry replaced him as Emerge's editor-in-chief. He felt the magazine had lost its focus on news, and he made changes to restore it. Drawing African-American journalists from the top newspapers in the United States, Curry replaced the magazine's staff.

In July 1994, BET announced that Emerge, which it said had "never broken even", would cease publication unless an investor or buyer came forward. The publisher estimated that an investment of $4 to $5 million over three to four years was necessary. The following month, MettersMedia Network purchased a 55 percent stake in the magazine for $2.8 million. During the first nine months of 1994, newsstand sales of Emerge increased 46 percent, and Curry told the Bay State Banner in February 1995 that the magazine's circulation might double over the next two years.

Emerge unexpectedly stopped publication in June 2000. The Washington Post said its circulation was 170,000, "more than most political magazines".
