= Running Mates (2000 film) =

2000 television film by Ron Lagomarsino

- DVD cover
- Genre: Comedy; Drama
- Written by: Claudia Salter
- Directed by: Ron Lagomarsino
- Starring: Tom Selleck; Laura Linney; Nancy Travis; Teri Hatcher; Faye Dunaway; Bob Gunton; Bruce McGill; Rachel Wilson
- Music by: John Debney
- Country of origin: United States
- Original language: English

Production
- Executive producers: Gerald Rafshoon; Albert S. Ruddy
- Producer: Andrew Gottlieb
- Cinematography: Alan Caso
- Editor: Pietro Cecchini
- Running time: 90 minutes
- Production company: Turner Films Inc.
- Budget: $13 million

Original release
- Network: TNT
- Release: August 13, 2000

Running Mates is a 2000 American made-for-television political comedy-drama film directed by Ron Lagomarsino and starring Tom Selleck. The film follows the presidential election campaign of James Pryce, a Democratic Party presidential candidate, who has a hard time deciding whom to pick as his vice-presidential running mate. Laura Linney, Nancy Travis, Faye Dunaway, and Teri Hatcher also star as Pryce's current or former love interests who have had a major influence on his success so far, but who also have a great deal of control over his decisions.

Created for Turner Entertainment, Running Mates was initially aired on TNT on the night of August 13, 2000, and has since been broadcast in Australia, Hungary, Iceland, and Sweden. Faye Dunaway's performance in the film earned her a Golden Globe Award nomination for Best Performance by an Actress in a Supporting Role in a Series, Miniseries or Motion Picture Made for Television, which she lost to Vanessa Redgrave for her work in If These Walls Could Talk 2.

== Plot ==
Michigan Governor James Reynolds Pryce (Tom Selleck) is a popular liberal politician who, while running for the office of the President of the United States, finds out to what a great degree his life and career are influenced by the women in his life. As a front-runner for the Democratic Party presidential candidate, Pryce owes the success of his campaign to his manager Lauren Hartman (Laura Linney) and his wife Jennifer (Nancy Travis). Pryce has not yet chosen a vice-presidential running mate and has a hard time making the decision. Senator Parker Gable (Robert Culp) was something of a mentor to Pryce in his early political career, but Gable is a womanizer which makes Pryce uncomfortable with making him the vice-presidential candidate. Nevertheless, Gable's Washington socialite wife Meg (Faye Dunaway) considers Gable to be the best choice and tries to exert pressure over Pryce to make this happen. Pryce's other choices are Senator Mitchell Morris (Bruce McGill), a lobbyist whom Pryce dislikes due to his close ties to Big Business, and Senator Terrence Randall (Bob Gunton), who is disliked by Pryce's shallow Hollywood campaign fundraising manager Shawna Morgan (Teri Hatcher). Having previously been sexually involved with Lauren, Meg, and Shawna before marrying Jennifer makes listening to their advice all that much harder for Pryce. All four women are seemingly more intent on exerting control over Pryce and winning their own personal battles against each other rather than honestly trying to help him make the correct political decision.

== Cast and characters ==
- Tom Selleck — Governor James Pryce
- Laura Linney — Lauren Hartman
- Nancy Travis — Mrs. James "Jennie" Pryce
- Teri Hatcher — Shawna
- Faye Dunaway — Mrs. Parker "Meg" Gable
- Bob Gunton — Senator Terrence Randall
- Bruce McGill — Senator Mitchell Morris
- Robert Culp — Senator Parker Gable
- Caroline Aaron — Jody Daniels
- Wayne Pére — Aide Larry
- Phillip Brock — Aide Fermin
- Matt Malloy — Aide Sam
- Stephen Lang — Ron Noble (Financier) (uncredited)
- Taylor Nichols — Dave
- Rachel Wilson — Heather Gable
- Steffani Brass — Brooke Pryce
- J. P. Manoux — Carl - (Producer #1)
- J. August Richards — Randall's Aide
- Mark Valley — Dick Tracy
- Adria Dawn — Katie Bowles
- Maggie Baird — Newscaster #2
- Andy Berman — Darren - Producer #2
- Jack Betts — Senator
- Bob Clendenin — Bum
- Ryan Cutrona — Reporter #2
- Takayo Fischer — Press #1
- Phil Proctor — Oregon Delegate
- Barbara Roberts — Rhode Island Delegate
- Albert S. Ruddy — Fatcat
- Katelin Petersen — Young Lauren Hartman
- Barbara Tyson — Newscaster #3
- Alberto Vazquez — Puerto Rico Delegate
- Ellis E. Williams — Reverend
- Linda Eder — Vocalist
- Mark Shields — Himself
- Robert D. Novak — Himself
- Kate O'Beirne — Herself
- Arianna Huffington — Herself
- Al Hunt — Himself
- Margaret Carlson — Herself
- Michael Kinsley — Himself
- Richard Nixon — Self (archive footage)

== Production ==
Running Mates was intended to give the viewers a somewhat realistic although humorous and exaggerated insight into politics and decision-making of presidential campaigns, so Gerald Rafshoon was brought on board. Rafshoon was the media manager during Jimmy Carter's presidential campaign, as well as his tenure in the White House. A private screening of the film was held for Carter, after which he agreed the film was, indeed, "realistic". In an interview with Lou Dobbs on CNN Today, Rafshoon admits "intentional" similarities existed between the film's characters and living persons on whom the characters were partially based, even admitting, "they're all public figures so they can sue us". Tom Selleck was picked for the role of Governor Pryce because he is politically independent, having donated money to both the Republican and the Democratic parties, and Rafshoon believed, "[Selleck]'s got the look and the heft" for the role, making it easy for viewers to "buy him as presidential candidate".

== See also ==
- Cinema of the United States
- List of American films of 2000
