= Kate O'Beirne =

American journalist (1949–2017)

- Born: Kate Monica Walsh; September 23, 1949; New York City, U.S.
- Died: April 23, 2017 (aged 67); Washington, D.C., U.S.
- Occupations: President of National Review Institute; Washington editor of National Review
- Known for: Her column, "Bread and Circuses"
- Spouse: James O'Beirne (m. 1976)
- Children: 2

Kate Walsh O'Beirne (September 23, 1949 – April 23, 2017) was the former president of National Review Institute and the Washington, D.C. editor of National Review. Her column, "Bread and Circuses," covered Congress, politics, and U.S. domestic policy.

O'Beirne was a regular contributor on CNN's Saturday night political round-table program, Capital Gang, along with Al Hunt, Mark Shields, Robert Novak, and Margaret Carlson. O'Beirne and Novak typically argued the conservative viewpoint, and Hunt, Shields, and Carlson provided the liberal viewpoint. She also served as a substitute host on CNN's Crossfire, a commentator for NewsHour with Jim Lehrer, and a political analyst for MSNBC's Hardball.

== Early life and education ==
O'Beirne was born Kate Monica Walsh in Brooklyn, New York City. She grew up in Manhasset, New York on Long Island. She was raised in a traditional Irish Catholic family.

O'Beirne's father was Matthew (Matty) Walsh, longtime owner of famed Manhattan saloon Jimmy Ryan's where dozens of jazz legends played, including Sidney Bechet, Ben Webster, and Coleman Hawkins.

She attended St. Mary's High School, graduating in 1967, and then attended Good Counsel College, a Catholic women's school in White Plains, New York, where she majored in English and journalism.

== Career ==
While at Good Counsel College, O'Beirne took a leave of absence to work on the successful 1970 U.S. Senate campaign of Conservative Party of New York State member James Buckley. She returned to his office as an aide after graduation.

In 1976, she graduated from St. John's University School of Law in Queens, and in the same year married James O'Beirne, an infantry officer in the United States Army who served as White House liaison to The Pentagon. For the next ten years, she traveled with him and raised their two sons.

In 1986, the family moved to Washington, D.C., where O'Beirne served as deputy assistant secretary for legislation at the United States Department of Health and Human Services until 1988. She then became deputy director of domestic policy studies at The Heritage Foundation, where she supervised studies in the area of health care, welfare, education, and housing and later served as the foundation's vice president of government relations. She was responsible for keeping Washington policymakers abreast of Heritage proposals and research findings in all areas of the foundation's study. She simultaneously served as a contributing editor for National Review.

In 1992, President of the United States George H. W. Bush named her to the Presidential Commission on Women in the Armed Forces.

In 1995, she began work as a part time contributing editor for National Review, and was soon appointed the magazine's Washington, D.C. editor. Her work on the magazine led to her invitation to join Capital Gang and other television opportunities.

She received an honorary degree from St. John's University in 1997.

O'Beirne was president of National Review Institute, a nonprofit public policy organization.

== Personal ==
O'Beirne was married to Army Lt. Col. James O'Beirne. O'Beirne had two sons, Philip O'Beirne and John O'Beirne. In 2016, O'Beirne was diagnosed with lung cancer. On April 23, 2017, she died at Georgetown University Hospital in Washington, D.C.

== Writings ==
- Women Who Make the World Worse: and How Their Radical Feminist Assault Is Ruining Our Schools, Families, Military, and Sports, Sentinel HC, 2005. ISBN 978-1-59523-009-6
