= Rowland Evans =

American journalist

- Born: Rowland Evans Jr. April 28, 1921; Whitemarsh Township, Pennsylvania, U.S.
- Died: March 23, 2001 (aged 79); Washington, D.C., U.S.
- Education: Yale University
- Occupation: Journalist
- Spouse: Katherine "Kay" Winton Evans

Rowland Evans Jr. (April 28, 1921 – March 23, 2001) was an American journalist. He was known best for his decades-long syndicated column and television partnership with Robert Novak, a partnership that endured, if only by way of a joint subscription newsletter, until Evans's death.

== Life and career ==
=== Early life ===
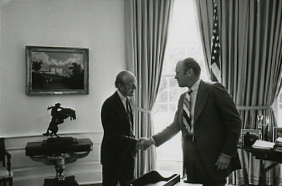
Evans greeting President Gerald Ford in 1975

Born in Whitemarsh Township, Pennsylvania, Evans attended Yale University briefly, but left to join the United States Marines and saw action in the Solomon Islands during World War II. Medically discharged in 1944 after contracting malaria, Evans began his journalism career with the Philadelphia Bulletin before he joining the New York Herald-Tribune and working his way up to becoming the paper's Congressional correspondent. He became a Washington journalist in 1945.

=== 1945–1979 ===
It was in that role that he met his lifelong writing partner, Robert Novak, the Capitol Hill correspondent for The Wall Street Journal. They founded the "Evans-Novak Political Report" in 1967, four years after they had launched their nationally syndicated column. His work landed him on the master list of Nixon political opponents. "Inside Report" became noteworthy among syndicated political columns for being what the trade called "dope pieces" almost exclusively: inside reporting more than polemics, even though the team's conservative inclination gradually became evident.

=== 1980–1990 ===
By 1980, Evans & Novak were among the most widely syndicated columns in the United States as well as frequent guests on news-oriented radio and television talk programs. The team was among the first to join the fledgling CNN, with Evans & Novak becoming one of the cable network's best-watched discussion programs. Al Hunt and Mark Shields later joined the show as Evans scaled back his on-air work, and the title became Evans, Novak, Hunt & Shields. In addition, Evans, on his own and with his writing partner, contributed essays to such magazines as Harper's, The Saturday Evening Post, The New Republic, The Atlantic, and others, not to mention joining his partner as a Reader's Digest contributing editor.

The team also co-wrote several books, including Lyndon B. Johnson: The Exercise of Power (1966); Nixon in the White House: The Frustration of Power (1971); and The Reagan Revolution (1981). They were featured prominently in The Boys on the Bus, Timothy Crouse's memorable best-seller about the workings of the Washington press corps during the 1972 presidential campaigns.

Despite his strong conservative stances, Evans was a close friend of President John F. Kennedy. Novak reported that Kennedy had his first dinner as president-elect with Evans.

=== 1990–2001 ===
Evans retired from the Evans & Novak syndicated column in 1993, but he remained Novak's partner on television and in publishing a bi-weekly newsletter, The Evans & Novak Political Report. He was diagnosed with esophageal cancer in 2000 and died in a Washington, D.C. hospital a month before his 80th birthday.
