= Robert Novak =

American journalist and columnist (1931–2009)

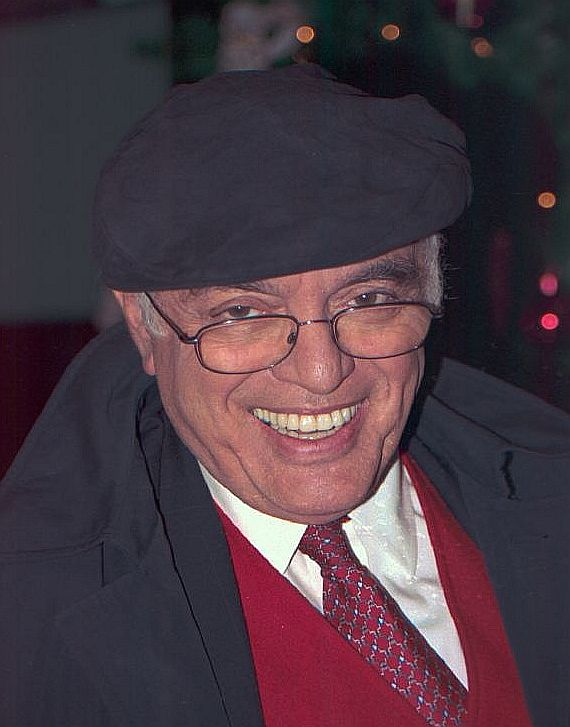
- Novak in 2002
- Born: Robert David Sanders Novak; February 26, 1931; Joliet, Illinois, U.S.
- Died: August 18, 2009 (aged 78); Washington, D.C., U.S.
- Education: University of Illinois Urbana-Champaign
- Occupations: Journalist; columnist; commentator; pundit; author
- Spouses: Rosanna Hall (div.); Geraldine (Williams) Novak (m. 1962)

Robert David Sanders Novak (Note: Pronounced /ˈnoʊvæk/.) (February 26, 1931 – August 18, 2009) was an American syndicated columnist, journalist, television personality, author, and conservative political commentator. After working for two newspapers before serving in the U.S. Army during the Korean War, he became a reporter for the Associated Press and then for The Wall Street Journal. He teamed up with Rowland Evans in 1963 to start Inside Report, which became the longest running syndicated political column in U.S. history and ran in hundreds of papers. They also started the Evans-Novak Political Report, a biweekly newsletter, in 1967.

Novak and Evans played a significant role for CNN after the network's founding. He worked as a television personality in programs such as Capital Gang, Crossfire, and Evans, Novak, Hunt, & Shields. He also wrote for numerous other publications such as Reader's Digest. He died of a brain tumor on August 18, 2009.

His colleagues nicknamed Novak the "Prince of Darkness", a description that he embraced and later used as a title for his autobiography. He started out with moderate or liberal views, but later served as a voice for American conservatism in his writing and television appearances.

== Early life ==
Novak was born on February 26, 1931, in Joliet, Illinois, the son of Jane Sanders and Maurice Novak, a chemical engineer. His paternal grandparents immigrated from Ukraine, and his mother's family was from Lithuania. Novak's parents were secular Jews who had little interaction with their local Jewish community and rarely attended religious services. Novak suffered from chronic bronchitis through his early childhood, which led his mother to drive him to and from school instead of letting him walk. Because of the constant family attention, his cousins mockingly called him "Baby Jesus". Novak also loved to tease, offend, and shock his family from an early age, and he later compared himself to French rebel Bertran de Born.

Novak's journalism career began when he was in high school as a student-writer for the Joliet Herald-News, his hometown newspaper, and he received ten cents per inch. After high school, he attended the University of Illinois at Urbana–Champaign (UI) from 1948 to 1952. His father had attended the college, and he later remarked that "I was an Illini from birth". He became a brother of the Alpha Epsilon Pi fraternity, at the time a mostly Jewish college fraternity, while attending the University of Illinois. Novak would later use the group's 'secret handshake' whenever he met fellow alumnus Wolf Blitzer.

He continued gaining journalism experience as a sports writer for the Daily Illini (DI), the college's student newspaper. Novak wrote how his disappointment about not being named the paper's main sports editor for the 1951–52 school year led him to skip his senior classes and to work full time for the Champaign-Urbana Courier. After four years at the University, Novak left it to become a full-time journalist without a degree, even though he was only one course short of the requirements. In 1993 a college Dean determined that four mandatory physical education classes that Novak had gone through for no credit should constitute enough credit hours, and Novak received his bachelor's degree. Novak later described his academic achievements as "very uneven." He spoke at the university's May 1998 commencement, and in his speech he credited the college for bringing him up from working class immigrant status into the American middle class.

During the Korean War, Novak served in the U.S. Army, and he reached the rank of lieutenant. He later stated that he had fully expected to die in the service.

== Career ==
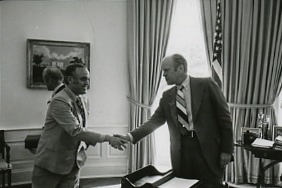
Novak greeting President Gerald Ford in 1975

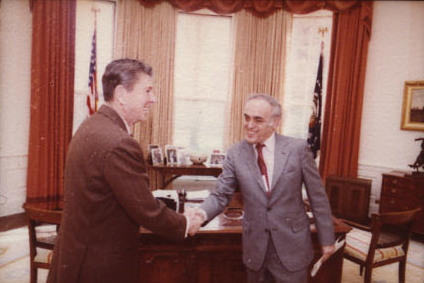
Novak greeting President Ronald Reagan in 1981

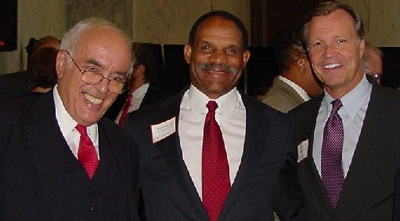
Novak with Mike Garrett and Christopher Cox in 2003

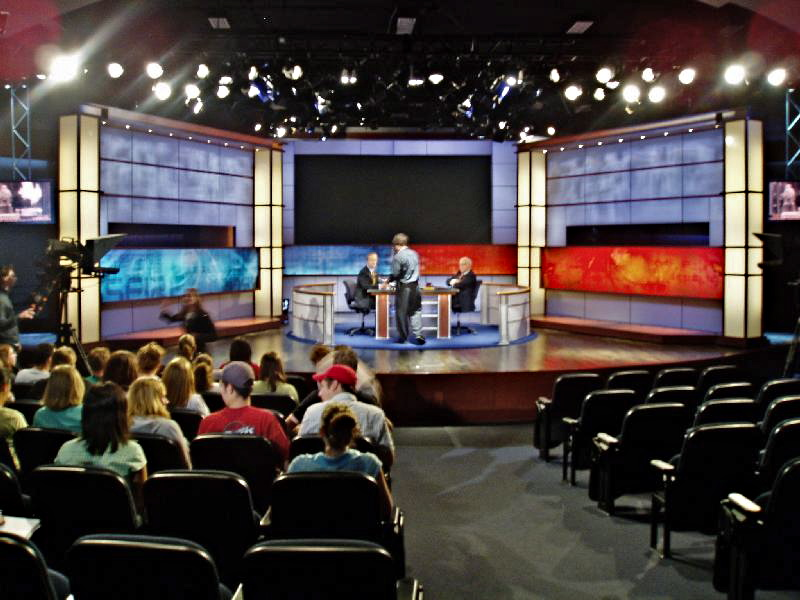
Novak on the set of Crossfire in 2005

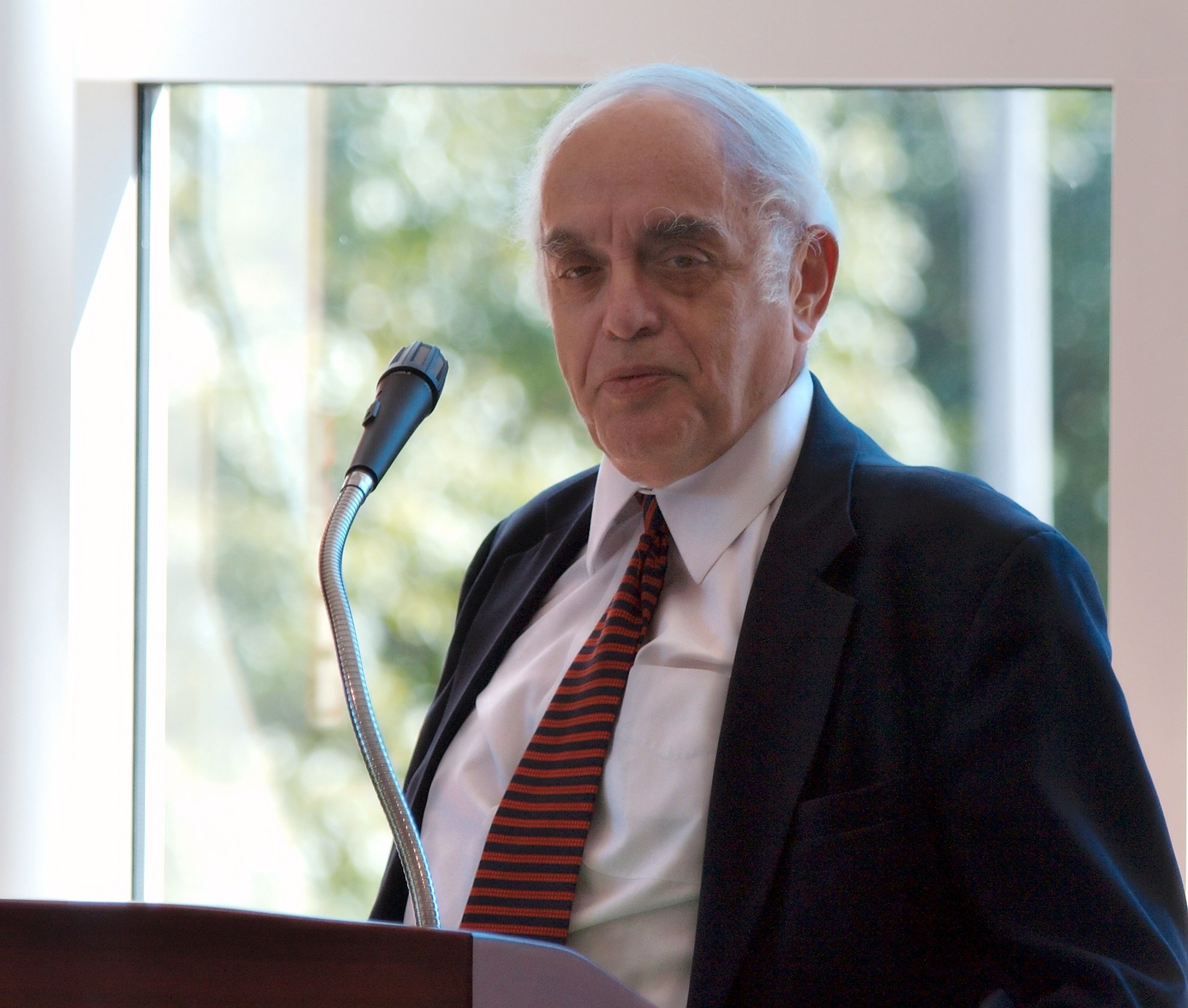
Novak discusses his memoir, Prince of Darkness, at Illini Union Bookstore in Champaign, Illinois on September 13, 2007.

After serving from 1952 to 1954, Novak rejoined his fledgling journalism career, joining the Associated Press (AP) as a political correspondent in Omaha, Nebraska. He was transferred to Lincoln, Nebraska, and then to Indianapolis, Indiana, covering the two state legislatures in his reporting. In 1957, Novak was transferred to Washington, D.C., where he reported on Congress. He left the AP to join the D.C. bureau of The Wall Street Journal in 1958, covering the Senate. He rose to the rank of chief congressional correspondent in 1961. He generally did his work without using tape recordings or paper notes, relying just on his detailed memory. Novak's colleagues at The Wall Street Journal later said that he absorbed himself in his work so completely that he often forgot to shave, left his shoes untied, and even started accidentally placing burning cigarettes into his pockets.

In 1963, Novak teamed up with Rowland Evans, a former Congressional correspondent for the New York Herald Tribune, to create the Inside Report, a newspaper column published six times a week. It was also known as Inside Washington. Evans knew Novak slightly as a fellow Capitol Hill journalist when they started. They had contrasting public images, with Novak dressing sloppily and Evans' appearing like a diplomat with a refined manner. Their column mixed standard reporting with their own editorial opinions. It began with muted, mostly centrist views, but their words drifted rightward over time. Novak's experience covering the Six-Day War in the field influenced his beliefs towards Evans' pro-Palestinian sympathies.

The column's factual accuracy has been called into question. Novak stated in his autobiography, "We were so ravenous for exclusive news that we were susceptible to manipulation by leaks, compromising our credibility." Chicago Sun-Times became the "home" paper for Inside Report from 1966 onward. Novak continued the column after Evans's departure on May 15, 1993. Evans died in 2001, and Inside Report ran in over 150 papers at that time through Creators Syndicate. Publication ended after Novak's cancer diagnosis in July 2008. Bloomberg L.P. has stated that the column was a must-read among political insiders, as did The Washingtonian. It was the longest running syndicated political column in U.S. history.

In 1967 Evans and Novak set up a biweekly political newsletter called the Evans–Novak Political Report (ENPR). They took a more broad approach in this series compared to their column, focusing on forecast elections and predicting socio-political trends rather than on breaking stories. Regnery Publishing eventually bought ENPR from Novak, but it left editorial control and hiring decisions in Novak's hands. In 2006, Timothy P. Carney of Regnery became Novak's partner in the newsletter. On February 4, 2009, Novak announced he was ending ENPR's publication. This last issue described the implications of Barack Obama's election as President, which the authors labeled a political 'paradigm shift'. Conservative writers such as John Fund, who later worked for The Wall Street Journal, Tim Carney (author of "The Big Ripoff," "Obamanomics"), and David Freddoso, who later worked for National Review Online, started off as contributors to the ENPR.

Novak became a regular panel member of the syndicated show The McLaughlin Group in 1982, starring alongside McLaughlin as well as Novak's friend Jack Germond. Novak sparred frequently with McLaughlin despite the fact that they both held similar political views.

Novak appeared on CNN on its opening week in 1980. His status as a well-known print reporter brought a sense of credibility to the fledgling new network, and Novak soon created a weekly interview show that Evans co-hosted. He established a public image as a combative debater on the program. Novak later became the executive producer of Capital Gang on CNN, which also featured him as a panelist on the show and included his friends Al Hunt and Mark Shields. He also took over as the conservative co-host of Crossfire from Pat Buchanan.

On August 4, 2005, Novak walked off the set during a live broadcast of the show Inside Politics, on which he appeared along with Democratic strategist and analyst James Carville. During a heated discussion about Florida Republican Representative Katherine Harris's just-announced 2006 bid for U.S. Senate, Novak uttered "I think that's bullshit!" after Carville remarked that Novak had "to show these right-wingers that he's got a backbone." As anchor Ed Henry was asking Carville a question, Novak threw off his microphone and stormed off the set. Critics later charged that Novak had done so to avoid discussing recent developments in the Valerie Plame affair on-air. In response to the incident, CNN suspended Novak for one day and apologized to its viewers, calling the outburst "inexcusable and unacceptable."

Novak retired from CNN after 25 years on December 23, 2005, stating that his relationship with the network lasted "longer than most marriages." Novak also said he had "no complaints" about CNN. Fox News had confirmed one week earlier that Novak had signed a contract to do unspecified work for the network. Novak stated that he still would have left CNN even if he had not been suspended in the August incident and did not go to Fox News because the network was more friendly to his point of view. Novak said:

In 25 years I was never censored by CNN and I said some fairly outrageous things and some very conservative things. I don't want to give the impression that they were muzzling me and I had to go to a place that wouldn't muzzle me.

His memoirs, entitled Prince of Darkness: Fifty Years Reporting in Washington, were published in July 2007 by Crown Forum, a division of Random House. "Prince of Darkness" was a nickname given to Novak by his friend reporter John Lindsay, because Lindsay "thought for a young man I took a very dim view of the prospects for our civilization," Novak said in an interview. Novak loved the nickname. He once dressed up as Darth Vader to a dinner with the Gridiron Club, and he then sang a song about Dick Cheney as the character. Still, he could be sensitive about his persona; he once asked Democratic Party giant Robert Schwarz Strauss, "Why does everyone take such an instant dislike to me?" Strauss responded, "Saves time."

At his height, Novak was one of the five most read columnists in the U.S. Throughout his career, Novak wrote for numerous other publications, serving notably as a contributing editor for Reader's Digest. He appeared on NBC's program Meet the Press over 200 times. He served as a longtime CNN television personality, and he appeared intermittently on Fox News after his August 2005 departure from CNN. Novak also played a role among many other reporters in Timothy Crouse's seminal nonfiction book The Boys on the Bus that described reporters covering the lead-up to the 1972 Presidential election. In August 2004, The Washington Post stated that Novak might "wince unto this day" at his portrayal in the book.

=== Recognition ===
Novak received an Alumni Achievement Award from the University of Illinois at Urbana–Champaign in 1997. Novak frequently visited his alma mater and interacted with students, establishing a scholarship in his name to support English and rhetoric majors in 1992. He spoke at the college's May 1998 commencement, urging graduates to use their education as a "bulwark against tyranny." Novak also served as a Radford Visiting Professor of Journalism for Baylor University in 1987. He was the 2001 winner of the National Press Club's 'Fourth Estate Award' for lifetime achievement in journalism as well. Novak appears in the 2008 award-winning documentary on political strategist Lee Atwater, Boogie Man: The Lee Atwater Story. In the film, Novak says "He tried to get me to write about Governor Dukakis having psychiatric problems but it really was a slander. He thought my weakness was that if I could get an exclusive story, I would jump at it, bite at it and not be as careful as I should be. That may be true, but I was careful enough not to get involved in that one."

Robert Novak was inducted as a Laureate of The Lincoln Academy of Illinois and awarded the Order of Lincoln (the State's highest honor) by the governor of Illinois in 1999 in the area of communications.

=== Notable events ===
==== Nixon administration ====
Novak pursued a continuous attack upon Richard Nixon's key aide H. R. Haldeman. He later wrote in his autobiography, "Bob Haldeman was treated more harshly because he refused any connection with me. He made himself more of a target than he had to be by refusing to be a source." Novak's partner Rowland Evans ended up on Richard Nixon's "master list" of enemies, although Novak himself was not mentioned. When they had started the column, Novak paid a 'courtesy call' to Nixon, who took the opportunity to admonish them to give Republicans a break.

==== Ford administration ====
Novak, along with collaborator Rowland Evans, learned in 1976 that a high-ranking Ford administration official had privately said that the current Soviet hegemony in Eastern Europe was preferable to the radical nationalism that could otherwise have come about. Novak broke the story in his column, which resulted in a government scandal. The Jewish Telegraphic Agency has stated that the issue significantly hurt Gerald Ford's prospects in the 1976 presidential election.

==== Orlando Letelier assassination ====
During the FBI investigation into Orlando Letelier's assassination, the contents of the briefcase he had with him were copied and leaked to Novak and his partner Rowland Evans as well as Jack Anderson of The New York Times by the FBI before being returned to Letelier's widow. According to Novak and Evans, the documents showed that Letelier was in constant contact with the leadership of the Unidad Popular exiled in East Berlin and supported by the East German Government. The FBI suspected that these leaders had been recruited by the Stasi. According to Novak, Evans and Anderson, documents in the briefcase showed that Letelier had maintained contact with Salvador Allende's daughter, Beatriz Allende, wife of Cuban DGI station chief Luis Fernandez Ona.

According to Novak and Evans, Letelier was able to receive funding of $5,000 a month from the Cuban government and under the supervision of Beatriz Allende, he used his contacts within the Institute for Policy Studies and western human rights groups to organize a campaign within the United Nations as well as the U.S. Congress to isolate Augusto Pinochet's dictatorship. Novak and Evans claimed this was part of an organized campaign to put pressure on Pinochet's government closely coordinated by the Cuban and Soviet governments, using individuals like Letelier to implement these efforts. Letelier's briefcase also allegedly contained his address book, which contained the names of dozens of known and suspected Eastern Bloc intelligence agents. All correspondence between Letelier and individuals in Cuba was supposedly handled via Julian Rizo, who used his diplomatic status to hide his activities.

Fellow IPS member and friend Saul Landau described Evans and Novak as part of an "organized right wing attack". In 1980, Letelier's widow, Isabel, wrote in The New York Times that the money sent to her late husband from Cuba was from western sources, and that Cuba had simply acted as an intermediary. Reporter John Nichols has written in The Nation that observers should "have a hard time forgiving" Novak for his role in the incident.

==== Clinton administration ====
During the Clinton years, Novak published accusations against administration members including Attorney General Janet Reno using sources such as unnamed FBI agents. Later, when in 2001 FBI agent Robert Hanssen was arrested and revealed to have been working for first the Soviets and then the Russians for 22 years, betraying American agents to their deaths, Novak admitted that Hanssen had been a primary source for some of those accusations.

==== CIA leak scandal ====
In 2003, he identified Valerie Plame as a CIA "operative" in his column of July 14. In doing so, he indirectly disclosed the organizational name of the company she used as cover, Brewster Jennings & Associates, the other operatives who worked for Brewster Jennings, and the informants who met with them. Although it is illegal for anyone, government official or otherwise, to knowingly distribute classified information (under US Code, Title 18, Section 793, Paragraph e), Novak was never charged with this crime because there was no evidence that Novak knew that Ms. Plame was a covert agent. Novak reported the information was provided to him by two "senior administration officials." These were eventually revealed to be Richard Armitage, who e-mailed him using the pseudonym "Wildford," with Novak assuming Karl Rove's comments as confirmation. During 2005, there were questions in the press regarding the apparent absence of focus on Novak by the special prosecutor Fitzgerald and the grand jury, specifically questions suggesting he may have already testified about his sources despite insisting publicly that he would not do so.

On July 12, 2006, Novak published a column at Human Events stating:

Special Prosecutor Patrick Fitzgerald has informed my attorneys that, after two and one-half years, his investigation of the CIA leak case concerning matters directly relating to me has been concluded. That frees me to reveal my role in the federal inquiry that, at the request of Fitzgerald, I have kept secret. I have cooperated in the investigation while trying to protect journalistic privileges under the First Amendment and shield sources who have not revealed themselves. I have been subpoenaed by and testified to a federal grand jury. Published reports that I took the Fifth Amendment, made a plea bargain with the prosecutors or was a prosecutorial target were all untrue.

When Richard Armitage admitted to being a source, Novak wrote an op-ed column describing Armitage's self-disclosure as "deceptive."

In 2008, however, an unrepentant Novak said in an interview with Barbara Matusow from the Nation Ledger:

From a personal point of view, I said in the book I probably should have ignored what I'd been told about Mrs. Wilson.

Now I'm much less ambivalent. I'd go full speed ahead because of the hateful and beastly way in which my left-wing critics in the press and Congress tried to make a political affair out of it and tried to ruin me. My response now is this: The hell with you. They didn't ruin me. I have my faith, my family, and a good life. A lot of people love me—or like me. So they failed. I would do the same thing over again because I don't think I hurt Valerie Plame whatsoever.

In a New York Times article in 2010, Valerie Plame said that the disclosure "destroyed (her husband's) international consulting business, wrecked her espionage career and nearly took down their marriage".

In the same interview, Novak also stated:

Journalistically, I thought it was an important story because it explained why the CIA would send Joe Wilson—a former Clinton White House aide with no track record in intelligence and no experience in Niger—on a fact-finding mission to Africa.

After Novak's death, David Frum commented that the whole episode had been ironic given that Richard Armitage, Joe Wilson, Valerie Plame, and Novak all had exactly the same opinions against a potential war in Iraq.

==== Israeli–Palestinian conflict ====
Novak took on a pro-Palestinian stance in the conflict, often criticizing Israel. In his syndicated column, Novak blamed Israel for the plight and mass exodus of Palestinian Christians. He has also met with several Palestinian Authority officials, including former Education Minister and Hamas leader Nasser al-Shaer. Novak praised former president Jimmy Carter for likening Israeli policy toward the Palestinians to apartheid in Israel. Novak once said that his opinions on Israel caused the greatest amount of his hate mail. He viewed this as understandable, saying "Israel is so important to Jewish people and its preservation is so vital".

After the 9/11 attacks, Novak stated that he believed the perpetrators had been largely motivated by revenge over U.S. support for Israel. He also argued that the event brought the nations closer together "in a way that cannot improve long-term U.S. policy objectives." In a November 2001 episode of Capital Gang, Novak said, "I am always amazed how American conservatives can get involved in this absolutely mindless support of the transigent [sic] Israeli policy." He argued that Yasser Arafat would be willing to accept Israel's right to exist, but Ariel Sharon would never recognize a Palestinian state. He also referred to Hamas as "freedom fighters," which prompted Margaret Carlson to remark that he's "the only person who would call Hamas freedom fighters" and Novak to respond that "people all over the world do."

The executive director of the National Jewish Democratic Council, Ira Forman, has called Novak's columns on Israel "awful." David Frum has called his column after the 9/11 attacks an "absurdity." The Jewish Telegraphic Agency has stated that Novak "ran a running battle with pro-Israel groups, claiming they were unduly influential in Washington" and that he "excoriated Jews in public service who were not shy about their faith." Reporter John Nichols, writing for The Nation, has praised Novak's views on Israel specifically and on foreign policy in general. Nichols remarked, "Novak maintained a healthy, and very American, disdain for military adventurism." Activist group Churches for Middle East Peace has also praised Novak's stance.

==== Amnesty, abortion, and acid ====
On April 25, 1972, George McGovern won the Massachusetts primary and Novak phoned Democratic politicians around the country, who agreed with his assessment that traditional blue collar Democratic voters were unaware of McGovern's true beliefs. On April 27, 1972, Novak reported in a column that an unnamed Democratic senator had talked to him about McGovern. "The people don't know McGovern is for amnesty, abortion, and legalization of pot," the senator said. "Once middle America—Catholic middle America, in particular—finds this out, he's dead." The label stuck and McGovern became known as the candidate of "amnesty, abortion, and acid," leading to his defeat that November in a 49-state landslide loss.

Novak was accused of manufacturing the quote. Novak has claimed that, to rebut this criticism, he took the senator to lunch after the campaign and had asked whether he could identify him as the source, but the senator said he would not allow his identity to be revealed. "Oh, he had to run for re-election", said Novak. "The McGovernites would kill him if they knew he had said that," Novak added.

On July 15, 2007, Novak disclosed on Meet the Press that the unnamed senator was Thomas Eagleton. Eagleton went on to become the Democratic vice presidential nominee and McGovern's running mate briefly in the 1972 election, before it was revealed that he suffered from bouts of depression throughout his life, resulting in several hospitalizations, which when revealed, humiliated the McGovern campaign and resulted in Eagleton being forced to quit the race. Political analyst Bob Shrum says that Eagleton would never have been selected as McGovern's running mate if it had been known at the time that Eagleton was the source of the quote. Shrum said:

Boy, do I wish he would have let you publish his name. Then he never would have been picked as vice president. Because the two things ... that happened to George McGovern ... were the label you put on him, number one, and number two, the Eagleton disaster. We had a messy convention, but he could have, I think in the end, carried eight or 10 states, remained politically viable. And Eagleton was one of the great train wrecks of all time.

Eagleton died on March 4, 2007, "relieving me of the need to conceal his identity," Novak wrote. Some of Eagleton's former aides were reportedly angry that Eagleton's name was attached to a quote that made him appear duplicitous. Asked about the story, Novak acknowledged that disclosing Eagleton's identity was "a judgment on my part." If there is any disagreement, Eagleton could settle it with him in heaven "or wherever we end up," Novak added.

== Political views ==
Novak was a registered Democrat, despite his conservative political views. He held more centrist views in his early career, and he supported the Democratic presidential candidacies of John F. Kennedy and Lyndon B. Johnson, of whom he was a friend. In later years, he said that he maintained his registered Democratic status so he could vote in District of Columbia Democratic primaries where victory would be tantamount to election. He was also close friends with Everett Dirksen. Novak later stated that reading Whittaker Chambers' book Witness changed his views from moderate-to-liberal to a strident anticommunism. Reading Chambers' message as a U.S. Army lieutenant in the Korean War gave him a feeling of moral absolutism in his cause. Novak's views turned further rightward through the 1970s, but Novak remained strongly critical toward Ronald Reagan and his supply side economics in the early 1980s. Novak changed his mind after debating economics with Reagan face to face, and he later wrote that Reagan was one of the very few politicians that he ever respected.

Novak strongly supported wars in Korea, Vietnam, and Grenada, but he took an anti-interventionist stance after that. He was a hard-line social conservative as well, holding anti-abortion and anti-divorce views. He also generally tended toward low-tax, small-government libertarian views, but he did not always agree with mainstream Republicans; in particular, he opposed the Iraq War. For this reason he has been called a paleoconservative, although this label has been disputed. Novak's political column once stated that he considered every single president in his lifetime to be a failure, with the lone exception of Reagan. After Novak's death on August 18, 2009, Chicago Sun-Times described him as an independent voice. The Daily Telegraph stated that Novak felt "glee" at starting interparty fighting.

In July 2007, Novak expressed support for Ron Paul's bid for the presidency. In the same year, and shortly after the summer publication of Novak's memoirs, he was interviewed by former columnist Bill Steigerwald. Asked of the future of the country, Novak said:

From my standpoint, I see the long Republican realignment ending and going into a period of Democratic supremacy. I think there will be a lot of mistakes and a lot of bad things done. But I do believe the American people are really up to making the best of their politicians. ... When I am given a chance to address college students, I always tell them, "Always love your country but never trust your government." I believe that.

David Frum, writing for National Review, essentially dismissed Novak as a contributor to the modern conservative movement in March 2003. His statement prompted a rejoinder from Novak and defenses by other commentators. Frum then wrote his book The Right Man motivated by what he called "Novak's disregard for truth." Novak attacked Frum again in his autobiography, labeling Frum a "liar" and a "cheat". After Novak's death, Frum wrote on his blog criticizing Novak while also reflecting that "Novak and I were fated always to misunderstand one another."

== Religious views ==
Raised in secular Jewish culture, Novak lived seven decades as an agnostic. He briefly attended Unitarian and then Methodist services at the behest of his first and second wives, but he was not interested in either faith. He particularly disliked the Methodists' anti-Vietnam War position. Novak was introduced to Catholic Christianity in the early 1980s when his friend Jeffrey Bell, a Republican political consultant and former Reagan aide, gave him some books on the Catholic faith. At that time, Novak had nearly died from spinal meningitis.

Novak's wife, Geraldine, began regular churchgoing in the early 1990s and eventually settled on St Patrick's Catholic Church, Washington, D.C. One day she persuaded Novak, who had not attended religious services for nearly 30 years, to join her at Mass. The celebrant was Fr. Peter Vaghi, whom he had known before Vaghi switched from politics to the priesthood. Novak then started to go to Mass regularly and decided to convert a few years later. According to Novak, the turning point came when he visited Syracuse University to lecture. Before he spoke, he was seated at a dinner table near a female student who wore a cross necklace. Novak asked her if she was Catholic and she asked him the same. Novak said he had been going to Mass each Sunday for the last four years, but had not converted. "Mr Novak," the young woman replied, "life is short, but eternity is forever." That brief sentence chilled Novak, who felt the student had channeled the Holy Spirit. When he got home and told Geraldine, they decided it was time to convert. In May 1998, Novak was received into the Roman Catholic Church at the age of 67 and became a Traditionalist Catholic. Geraldine was already a Catholic. Al Hunt, Judy Woodruff, Fred Barnes, Margaret Carlson, Daniel Patrick Moynihan, Henry Hyde, and Rick Santorum attended Novak's baptism.

McCloskey was one of the two priests—the other was Vaghi—from whom Novak received instruction in the Catholic faith. Andrew Sullivan claimed that Novak was a member of Opus Dei. John L. Allen Jr., however, in his authoritative study, Opus Dei, wrote that Novak was not a member. Novak felt that his new faith did not influence his personal behavior or his political views, saying, "I'm a Christian now, but I still have some bad traits."

== Final years ==
On July 23, 2008, Novak received a police citation for failing to yield a right of way to an 86-year-old pedestrian, Don Clifford Liljenquist, who was struck by Novak in slow-moving traffic and taken to a hospital, where he was treated for minor injuries. Novak left the scene of the crash, driving approximately one block from the scene before being flagged down by a cyclist who had witnessed the collision and then called police. He said that he was unaware that a collision had occurred until being informed by eyewitnesses. This is likely to be accurate, as it is typical in patients with nondominant (usually right-sided) brain tumors that cause left-sided visual problems (including visual neglect), which Novak had ("I have lost not only left peripheral vision but nearly all my left vision"). The pedestrian was taken to George Washington University Hospital and treated for a dislocated shoulder. There were numerous reports from D.C.-area residents that Novak was prone to road rage and had a habit of flipping off motorists; however, he denied that these complaints were true. "I'm 77 years old. I'm not an aggressive driver anymore." he said shortly after the July 23 incident. When asked about his Corvette, Novak replied, "I've been driving them since 1961."

On July 27, 2008, four days after the car accident, Novak was admitted to Brigham and Women's Hospital in Boston, where he was diagnosed with brain cancer. In a written statement given to his publisher, Novak said: "Doctors will soon begin appropriate treatment. I will be suspending my journalistic work for an indefinite but, God willing, not too lengthy period." Physicians often check for brain tumors in patients who did not realize they struck something in a car accident, as this can be a focal neurologic sign. Novak tendered his resignation from his column on August 4, 2008, after revealing that the prognosis on his tumor was considered "dire". Later that month, he began writing new opinion columns for Creators Syndicate.

On February 4, 2009, Novak announced in his newsletter, the Evans-Novak Political Report, that the biweekly newsletter would be coming to an end due to his illness. The newsletter, started four years after the column, had been published continuously since 1967.

== Personal life ==
Novak's first wife was Rosanna Hall; they divorced. In 1962, he married Geraldine Williams, who was a secretary for President Lyndon B. Johnson. Their daughter, Zelda, worked for Ronald Reagan's presidential campaign and for Vice President Dan Quayle. They have a son, Alex, who works as an editor at Regnery Publishing. Although friends with social commentator Michael Novak, Robert Novak was not related.

Novak converted to Catholicism in May 1998 after his wife, Geraldine, did so. He had two children, a daughter and a son.

In his later life, Novak drove a 2002 black Corvette and he had his license suspended several times for speeding. He also participated in a charity car race in Sebring, Florida, which he won. Washingtonian magazine labeled him a "speed freak." Novak was also a passionate fan of basketball, particularly of the Washington Bullets (now Wizards), and the Maryland Terrapins men's basketball team. He was a member of the Terrapins Club booster organization. Wolf Blitzer remarked in August 2009, "I always used to see him ... Redskins games, Wizards games, always there."

Novak died on August 18, 2009, at the age of 78, due to complications from a brain tumor. He had returned home to spend his last days with his family after being hospitalized from July 10 to 24. He is interred at Gate of Heaven Cemetery in Silver Spring, Maryland.

== Publications ==
External videos
- Booknotes interview with Novak on Completing the Revolution, January 30, 2000, C-SPAN
- Interview with Novak on The Prince of Darkness, June 25, 2007, C-SPAN
- Q&A interview with Novak about The Prince of Darkness, July 15, 2007, C-SPAN

- Robert D. Novak (1965). The Agony of the G.O.P., 1964. New York: The Macmillan Company.
- Rowland Evans; Robert D. Novak (1966). Lyndon B. Johnson: The Exercise of Power. New York: New American Library.
- Rowland Evans; Robert D. Novak (1971). Nixon in the White House: The Frustration of Power. New York: Random House. ISBN 978-0-394-46273-8.
- Rowland Evans; Robert D. Novak (1981). The Reagan Revolution. New York: E. P. Dutton. ISBN 978-0-525-18970-1.
- Robert D. Novak (2000). Completing the Revolution: A Vision for Victory in 2000. New York: The Free Press. ISBN 0-7432-4271-8.
- Robert D. Novak (2007). The Prince of Darkness: 50 Years Reporting in Washington. New York: Crown Forum. ISBN 978-1-4000-5199-1.

== See also ==
- Conservatism in the US
- Plame affair grand jury investigation
