= Conniff =

Conniff is a surname. Notable people with the surname include:

- Frank Conniff (born 1956), American writer, actor, comedian, and producer
- Frank Conniff (journalist) (1914–1971), American journalist
- Ray Conniff (1916–2002), American musician
- Richard Conniff (born 1951), American writer
- Ruth Conniff, American journalist
