= Mona Charen =

American journalist, author, and political commentator (born 1957)

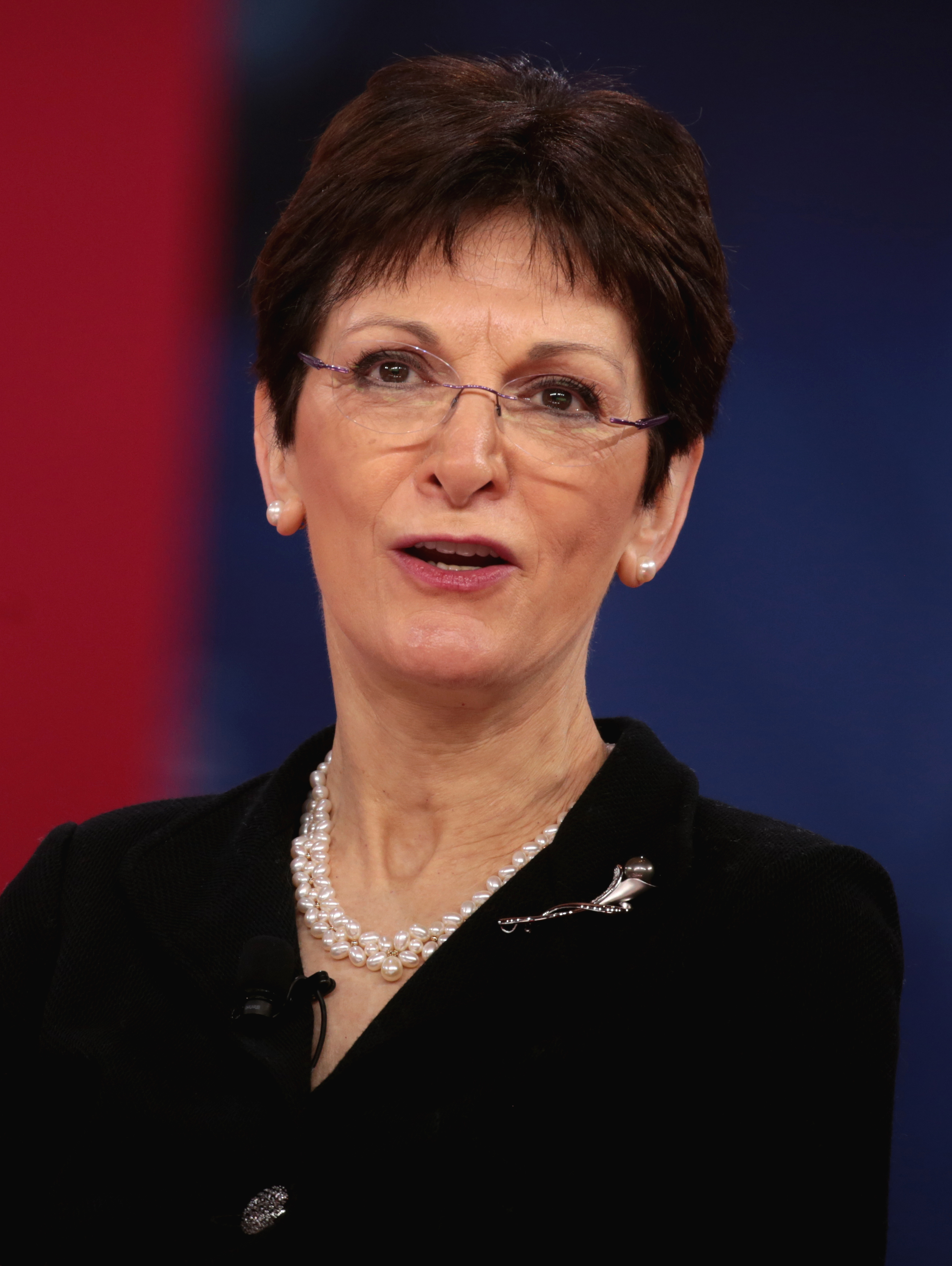
- Charen in 2018
- Born: Mona Elaine Charen; February 25, 1957 (age 69); New York City, U.S.
- Education: Barnard College (BA); George Washington University (JD)
- Occupations: Columnist, writer, political commentator, journalist
- Spouse: Robert Parker
- Children: 3

Mona Charen Parker (née Charen /ˈʃɛərən/ SHAIR-ən; born February 25, 1957) is an American conservative columnist, journalist, and political commentator. Charen has written four books, and is an outspoken critic of the Trump administration.

== Early life and education ==
Charen was born in New York City and raised in Livingston, New Jersey, where she went to school with fellow journalist Ruth Marcus, starting "in fourth grade." She is Jewish. She received her B.A. degree with honors from Barnard College in 1979 and a J.D. degree from George Washington University Law School in 1984.

== Career ==
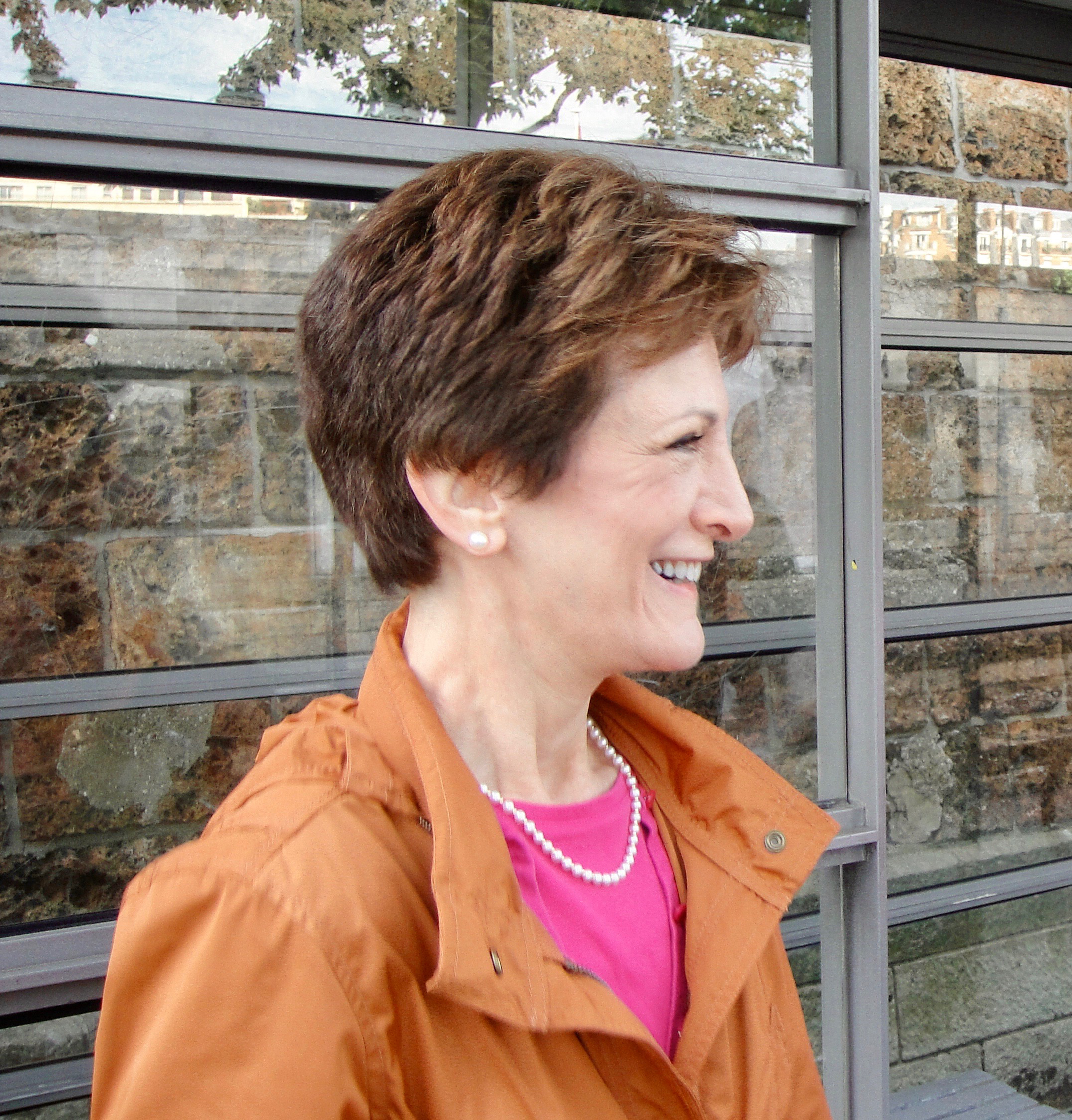
Charen in Paris in 2010

Charen wrote for National Review, where she was an editorial assistant starting in 1979. She later joined the staff of First Lady Nancy Reagan as a speechwriter. Charen then worked on President Ronald Reagan's staff, in the White House Office of Public Liaison and in the Office of Communications.

Charen served as Jack Kemp's speechwriter in his unsuccessful 1988 presidential bid. She launched her syndicated column in 1987. It is syndicated by Creators Syndicate and has been featured in more than 200 papers, including the Boston Globe, Baltimore Sun, St. Louis Post-Dispatch, Atlanta Journal-Constitution, and The Washington Times.

Charen was a regular weekly commentator on CNN's The Capital Gang, which appeared on Saturdays. Following an on-air heated exchange with fellow panelist Al Hunt, the two of them did not appear on the same panel for several weeks. Charen switched to Capital Gang Sunday when that program was launched, appearing until the program was cancelled.

In 2010, Charen won the Eric Breindel Journalism Award. In 2014, she became a senior fellow at the Ethics and Public Policy Center.

In 2016, Charen was a member of the "Never Trump" movement, although she did not support Hillary Clinton's presidential campaign.

In 2018, Charen was invited to participate in a CPAC panel discussion. Her comments, which elicited boos and jeers from the audience, included the following:

I am disappointed in people on our side for being hypocrites about sexual harassers and abusers of women, who are in our party, who are sitting in the White House, who brag about their extramarital affairs, who brag about mistreating women—and because he happens to have an 'R' after his name we look the other way ... This is a party that endorsed Roy Moore for the Senate in the state of Alabama even though he was a credibly accused child molester. You cannot claim that you stand for women and put up with that.

Charen subsequently wrote a New York Times op-ed entitled "I'm Glad I Got Booed at CPAC". She has written four books: Useful Idiots: How Liberals Got it Wrong in the Cold War and Still Blame America First (2003), Do-Gooders: How Liberals Hurt Those They Claim to Help (and the Rest of Us) (2005), Sex Matters: How Modern Feminism Lost Touch with Science, Love, and Common Sense (2018), and Hard Right: The GOP's Drift Toward Extremism (2023). Two of her books are New York Times bestsellers.

In 2020, Charen supported Joe Biden's presidential campaign, writing that “I want the Republican Party to feel spanked." In 2024 she voted for Kamala Harris.

Charen was policy editor of The Bulwark website and hosted the Beg to Differ podcast before it ended in 2024. Charen hosts The Mona Charen Show, as of 2025.

== Personal life ==
Charen is married to Robert P. Parker, a Washington, D.C., lawyer. They have three sons.

== Bibliography ==
External videos
- Booknotes interview with Charen on Useful Idiots, March 30, 2003, C-SPAN
- Presentation by Charen on Useful Idiots, April 9, 2003, C-SPAN
- Presentation by Charen on Do-Gooders, March 17, 2005, C-SPAN
- Q&A interview with Charen on Sex Matters, July 1, 2018, C-SPAN
- Presentation by Charen on Sex Matters, July 10, 2018, C-SPAN
- Washington Journal interview with Charen on Sex Matters, July 22, 2018, C-SPAN
- Washington Journal interview with Charen on Sex Matters, December 28, 2018, C-SPAN

- Useful Idiots: How Liberals Got It Wrong in the Cold War and Still Blame America First. Regnery Publishing. 2003. ISBN 0-89526-139-1.
- Do-Gooders: How Liberals Hurt Those They Claim to Help (and the Rest of Us). Sentinel. 2005. ISBN 1-59523-003-3.
- Charen, Mona (2018). Sex Matters: How Modern Feminism Lost Touch With Science, Love and Common Sense. Crown Publishing. ISBN 978-0451498397.
- Charen, Mona (2023). Hard Right: The GOP's Drift Toward Extremism. Creators. ISBN 978-1949673944.

== See also ==
- 2017–18 United States political sexual scandals
- Donald Trump sexual misconduct allegations
