= Evans, Novak, Hunt & Shields =

Evans, Novak, Hunt & Shields is an interview/political discussion show on CNN hosted by Rowland Evans and Robert Novak. The weekly program featured four rotating panelists, including Evans, Novak, Al Hunt and Mark Shields. It debuted on the network in 1982.

Originally, the program was called Evans & Novak. After Evans retired, he stopped appearing on the show regularly and was largely replaced by liberal columnists Shields and Hunt, who alternated weekly in co-hosting with Novak, who appeared every week. The addition of Shields and Hunt resulted in the change in title. Evans still appeared occasionally, however, until his 2001 death, when the show was renamed Novak, Hunt & Shields. The show was cancelled in November 2002.
