= Capital Gang =

- Starring: Pat Buchanan; Robert Novak; Al Hunt; Mark Shields; Mona Charen; Margaret Warner; Margaret Carlson; Kate O'Beirne
- Country of origin: United States
- Original language: English

Original release
- Network: CNN

Capital Gang is an American weekly political talk show on CNN which aired on Saturday evenings at 7 p.m. ET. The show debuted in the fall of 1988 and ran until CNN cancelled it in 2005.

The original panel was Pat Buchanan, Robert Novak, Al Hunt, and Mark Shields. Mona Charen and Margaret Warner joined the panel in 1992, when Buchanan left the show to run for president in 1992. In 1993, Warner left the program to join PBS and was replaced by Margaret Carlson, and Kate O'Beirne replaced Charen when she moved to Capital Gang Sunday in 1995. Typically four of the commentators were featured along with a prominent public official from either party. Buchanan, O'Beirne, Charen and Novak were the conservative panelists, while Shields, Hunt, Warner and Carlson were the liberal commentators.

Capital Gang Sunday was hosted by James Glassman in the mid-1990s. It featured panelists Juan Williams, Howard Fineman, Ruth Conniff, James Warren, and Mona Charen. The show did not feature any guests and was more cerebral than combative, in contrast to the Saturday version. In 1998, it was canceled, along with CNN's Sunday edition of Crossfire.

In 2005, after overall declining ratings at the network, CNN attempted to shake up its programming by cancelling several of its politically oriented shows, including the Capital Gang and Crossfire.

The Capital Gang panelists appeared together again on NBC's Meet the Press with Tim Russert on February 17, 2008. With the Democratic presidential nomination race still very much undecided, and the role of the superdelegates in question, Hunt, Carlson, Shields, Novak and O'Beirne gathered to discuss the issues.
