= Adria Dawn =

American actress

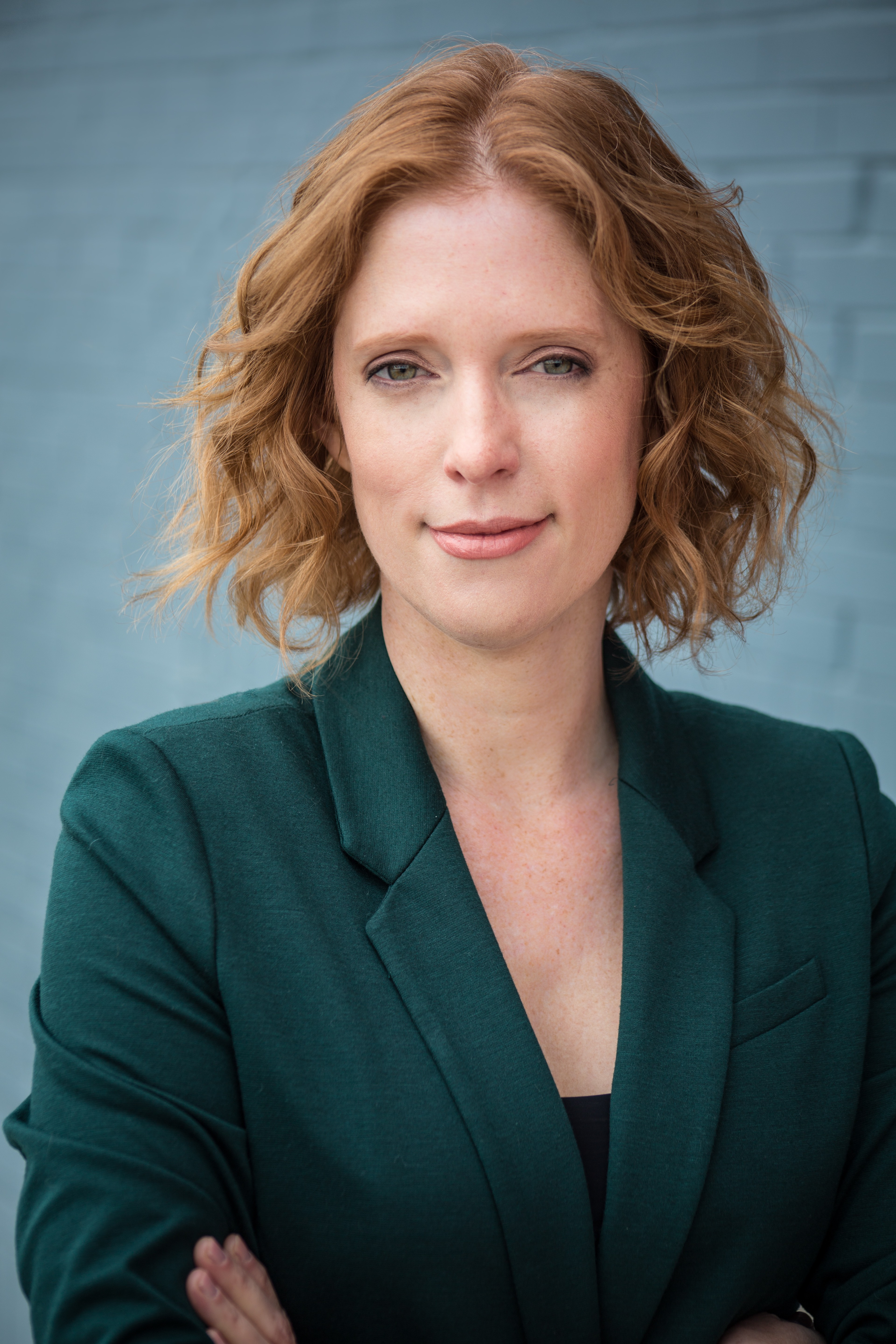
Adria Dawn

Adria Dawn (born May 24, 1974 in Champaign, Illinois) is an American actress, filmmaker and educator. She is most known for her work on Ryan Murphy's cult hit Popular (1999–2001). She was nominated by Jane Magazine as "one of the gustiest women on television" for her portrayal of April Tuna. She continued working with Murphy in Nip/Tuck (2006) as Parker the Scientologist expert appearing in three episodes. Dawn's other notable television appearances include recurring roles in 7th Heaven (1999), Felicity (2002) and NCIS (2006–2008) as well as a supporting role in the made-for-TV movie Running Mates (2000) and appearances on Judging Amy (2002), Boston Public (2003), Medium (2005), My Name Is Earl (2006), Campus Ladies (2006), Help Me Help You (2006), Ned's Declassified School Survival Guide (2007), Easy Abby (2013–2015), Chicago Fire (2014), and Chicago Med (2020)

Dawn's film work includes Beneath Loch Ness (2001), the all improvisational movie Man of the Year (2002), the late Stephen J. Cannell's Dead Above Ground (2002), Dimples (2008), Teenage Ghost Punk (2014), The Drunk (2014), Uncle John (2015), Hunter (2019) and An Ideal Candidate (2020). Her notable short film performances include Golden Showers (2004), Lucy (2013), In The Paint (2014), #nofilter (2016), Bozonova (2017), Breathing Above the Tree Line (2018), Vince: The Punctual Vagrant (2020), Town Hall (2019) and Starfield Tectonics (2019)

As a writer, director, and producer, Dawn has made several films for social change with Revealing Media Group including Bystander (2014), Excluded (2015), Viral (2016), Pressure (2016), Help (2017), Blackout (2018) and Unsafe (2019).

As executive producer and star, Dawn has also created Dorkumentary. This award-winning, improv-based comedy series was made through Tarleton/Dawn Productions. There are a total of seven episodes released from 2008 to 2018. In November 2017, Adria Dawn and David Tarleton presented DorkumentaryLIVE! at Stage 773 in Chicago, IL turning this web series into a live variety format.

Dawn also works as an on-camera acting teacher, having taught at Acting Studio Chicago, The Performers School, Tarleton/Dawn Productions, The Actors Centre in London and Columbia College Chicago.

== Filmography ==
=== Acting ===
- Alexis Ronan (TV Movie) 2020
- An Ideal Candidate 2020
- Town Hall (Short) 2019
- No Better Lot 2020
- Chicago Med (TV Series) 2020
- Vince: The Punctual Vagrant (Short) 2020
- Breathing above the Treeline (Short) 2019
- Starfield Tectonics (Short) 2019
- Dorkumentary (TV Series) 2008–2018
- Hunter 2018/I
- Bozonova (Short) 2018
- Easy Abby (TV Series) 2013–2018
- Dark Tales 2017
- nofilter (Short) 2016
- In the Paint (Short) 2015
- Uncle John 2015
- Sin Verite 2014
- Teenage Ghost Punk 2014
- The Drunk 2014
- Chicago Fire (TV Series) 2014
- Lucy (Short) 2013/II
- Dimples 2008
- NCIS (TV Series) 2006–2008
- Ned's Declassified School Survival Guide (TV Series) 2007
- Help Me Help You (TV Series) 2006
- Nip/Tuck (TV Series) 2006
- Campus Ladies (TV Series) 2006
- Monday 2006/I
- My Name Is Earl (TV Series) 2006
- Medium (TV Series) 2005
- Golden Showers (Short) 2004
- Boston Public (TV Series) 2003
- Dead Above Ground 2002
- Judging Amy (TV Series) 2002
- Felicity (TV Series) 2002
- Man of the Year 2002
- Beneath Loch Ness 2001
- Popular (TV Series) 1999–2001
- Running Mates (TV Movie) 2000
- Blessings from the Food Court 1999
- 7th Heaven (TV Series) 1999

=== Director ===
- Unsafe 2019
- Architecture (Short) 2020
- Ozark Mountain Christmas (Short) 2020
- Hustle (Short) 2019/IIThe
- Academia (Short) 2019
- The Fulbright (Short) 2019
- Blackout (Short) 2019
- Help (Short) 2018
- Pressure (Short) 2016
- Viral (Short) 2016
- Excluded (Short) 2015
- Bystander (Short) 2014
