= The Progressive =

American political magazine and website

- October 2002 cover
- Acting Managing Editor: David Boddiger
- Categories: Politics, culture
- Frequency: Monthly
- Founder: Robert M. La Follette, Sr.
- Founded: 1909; 117 years ago (as La Follette's Weekly)
- First issue: 1929; 97 years ago (as The Progressive)
- Company: Progressive, Inc. (a non-profit corporation)
- Country: United States
- Based in: Madison, Wisconsin
- Language: English
- Website: progressive.org
- ISSN: 0033-0736
- OCLC: 531780706

The Progressive is a left-leaning American magazine and website covering politics and culture. Founded in 1909 by U.S. senator Robert M. La Follette Sr. and co-edited with his wife Belle Case La Follette, it was originally called La Follette's Weekly and then La Follette's. In 1929, it was recapitalized and had its name changed to The Progressive.

From 1928 until June 1940, The Progressive was co-owned by La Follette family and William Evjue's daily newspaper The Capital Times, after which time full ownership and control was obtained by the La Follettes and Morris H. Rubin, publicity director of Philip La Follette's National Progressives of America political organization, was installed as editor.

The magazine's headquarters remain in Madison, Wisconsin.

The publication covers civil rights and civil liberties-related topics, immigrant issues, environmentalism, criminal justice reform, and democratic reform. Its current acting and managing editor is David Boddiger. Previous editors included La Follette Sr., Belle Case La Follette, their son Robert Jr., William Evjue, Morris Rubin, Erwin Knoll, Matthew Rothschild, Bill Lueders and Ruth Conniff.

== History ==
=== La Follette's Weekly ===
On the first page of its first issue, La Follette wrote this introduction to the magazine:

In the course of every attempt to establish or develop free government, a struggle between Special Privilege and Equal Rights is inevitable. Our great industrial organizations [are] in control of politics, government, and natural resources. They manage conventions, make platforms, [and] dictate legislation. They rule through the very men elected to represent them. The battle is just on. It is young yet. It will be the longest and hardest [battle] ever fought for Democracy. In other lands, the people have lost. Here we shall win. It is a glorious privilege to live in this time, and have a free hand in this fight for government by the people.

Some of the campaigns La Follette's Weekly engaged in were non-intervention in World War I, opposition to the Palmer Raids in the early 1920s, and calling for action against unemployment during the Depression. La Follette's wife, Belle, edited the publication's women's section, and also wrote articles for the publication condemning racial segregation. An early associate editor was the writer Herbert Quick.

=== The Progressive ===
During the 1940s, The Progressive adopted an anti-Stalinist view of the Soviet Union.

During the early 1940s, the magazine argued that the United States should stay out of World War II. Following the attack on Pearl Harbor, The Progressive declared its support for the American war effort. However, The Progressive also condemned the dropping of the atom bomb on Hiroshima, in contrast to both The Nation and The New Republic's support for the bombing. The Progressive reprinted an essay from The Christian Science Monitor by Richard Lee Strout, arguing that by using the bombs, "The United States has incurred a terrible responsibility to history which now, unfortunately, can never be withdrawn".

In 1947, The Progressive's editors announced they were suspending publication. However, after readers raised $40,000 to save the magazine, The Progressive returned as a monthly magazine issued as a non-profit venture.

In the 1950s, The Progressive criticized McCarthyism, although the magazine agreed that the U.S. government had the right to blacklist members of the Communist Party. The Progressive issued a special issue criticizing McCarthy, McCarthy: A Documented Record in 1954; sections from the issue were read aloud in the U.S. Senate, and it became the magazine's best-selling issue. The Progressive also criticized U.S. nuclear policy and clandestine CIA activity in this period.

In the 1960s, the magazine published five articles by Martin Luther King Jr. and James Baldwin's open letter, "My Dungeon Shook - Letter to my Nephew on the One Hundredth Anniversary of Emancipation", the first section of The Fire Next Time. The Progressive also denounced U.S. involvement in Indochina.

In 1984, The Progressive published "Behind the Death Squads" by Allan Nairn, a critique of U.S. policy in El Salvador.

The Progressive opposed the Persian Gulf War, accusing the George H. W. Bush administration of rejecting any options for peaceful negotiation of the crisis. While condemning Saddam Hussein's government for its abuse of human rights, it accused the Bush administration of hypocrisy for not taking action against other governments that also abused human rights. The magazine also opposed the second Iraq War.

=== United States v. Progressive, Inc. ===
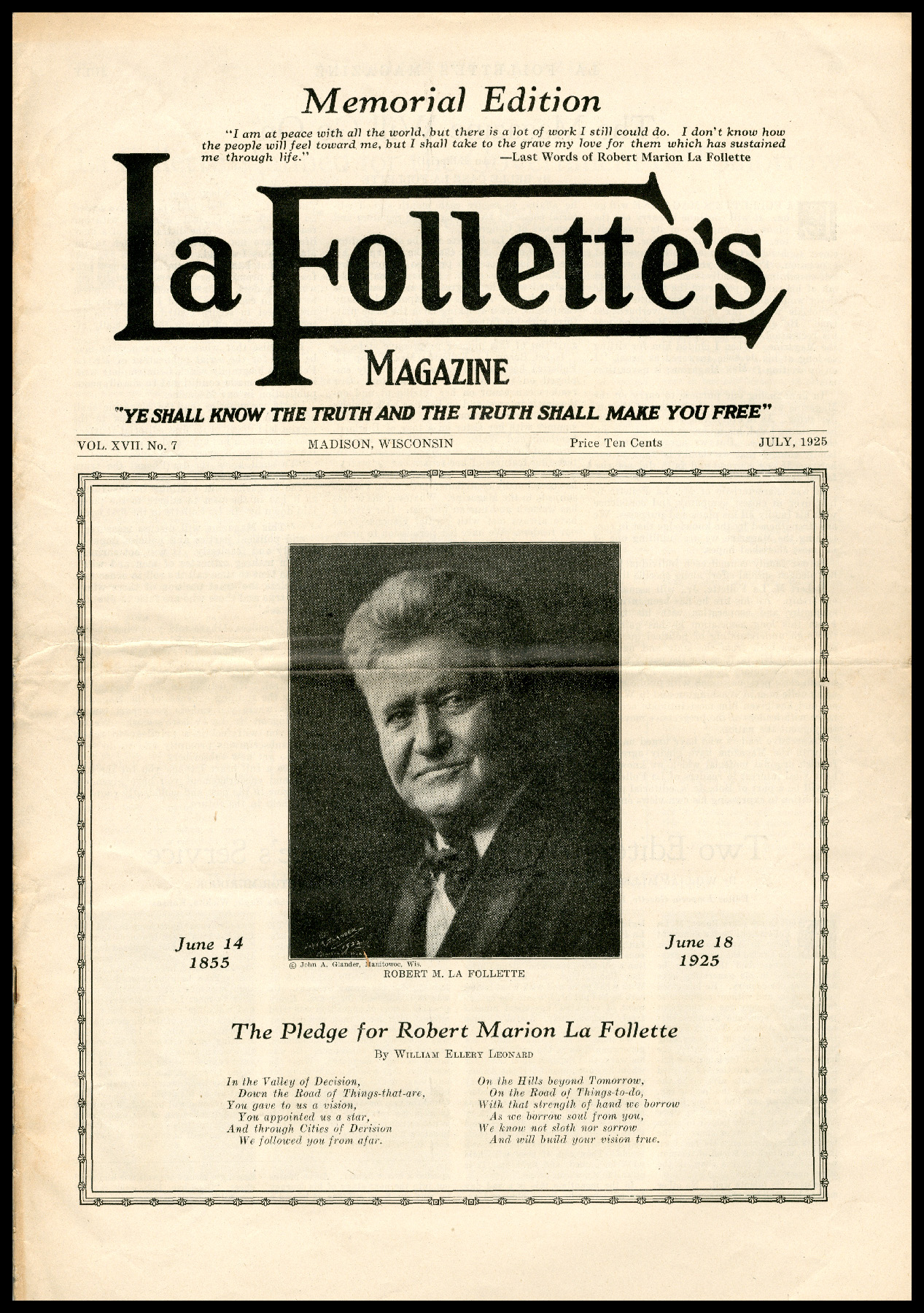
The forerunner of The Progressive was LaFollette's Magazine, established in Madison, Wisconsin in 1909.

In 1979, The Progressive gained national attention for its article by Howard Morland, "The H-bomb Secret: How we got it and why we're telling it", which the U.S. government suppressed for six months because it contained classified information. The magazine prevailed in a landmark First Amendment case of prior restraint, United States v. Progressive, Inc..

=== 2011 Wisconsin protests ===
Located a few blocks from the Wisconsin State Capitol, The Progressive covered the protests that began in February 2011 in response to Governor Scott Walker's Wisconsin budget repair bill. Madison Magazine named The Progressive's political editor Ruth Conniff as one of its Editors' Choice in 2011 for her "frontline dispatches from inside and outside the State Capitol and the courtroom across the street".

=== 100th anniversary ===
For its 100th year in print, the magazine published a book featuring "some of the best writing in The Progressive from 1909 to 2009" titled Democracy in Print, published by the University of Wisconsin Press.

=== Circulation ===
With a fall to 27,000 subscribers in 1999, in April 2004, following the Iraq War, The Progressive's circulation reached a record 65,000. By 2010, circulation had settled near 47,000.

The Progressive solicits gifts, grants, and sponsorships, publicizing donors who give a total of $5,000 or more per calendar year, according to its website.

== Notable contributors ==
Throughout the years, The Progressive has published articles by Jane Addams, James Baldwin, Louis Brandeis, Noam Chomsky, Clarence Darrow, John Kenneth Galbraith, Charles V. Hamilton, Nat Hentoff, Seymour Hersh, Molly Ivins, June Jordan, Helen Keller, Martin Luther King Jr., Sidney Lens, Jack London, Milton Mayer, A.J. Muste, George Orwell, Marcus Raskin, Bertrand Russell, Edward Said, Carl Sandburg, Upton Sinclair, Lincoln Steffens, I.F. Stone, Norman Thomas, George Wald, James Wechsler and Howard Zinn.

It has also published liberal politicians such as Russ Feingold, J. William Fulbright, Dennis Kucinich, George McGovern, Bernie Sanders, Adlai Stevenson, and Paul Wellstone.
