= Ruth Conniff =

American journalist

- Born: Madison, Wisconsin, U.S.
- Education: Yale University (BA)
- Occupation: Journalist

Ruth Conniff is an American progressive journalist who served as editor-at-large of The Progressive. and is now the editor-in-chief of the Wisconsin Examiner. Conniff has also written for The Nation and the New York Times among other publications.

== Early life ==
Conniff was born and raised in Madison, Wisconsin. She attended Yale University, where she ran track and edited the campus magazine, The New Journal. She completed a B.A. in philosophy cum laude in 1990. She resides in Maple Bluff, Wisconsin.

== Career ==
Previously the political editor of The Progressive, Conniff was named editor-in-chief in 2013. According to her byline at The Progressive: "Ruth Conniff covers national politics for The Progressive and is a voice of The Progressive on many TV and radio programs. Conniff was a regular on CNN’s Capital Gang Sunday and is now a regular on PBS’s To the Contrary. She also has appeared frequently on C-SPAN’s Washington Journal and on NPR and Pacifica."

Conniff is editor-in-chief of the Wisconsin Examiner. Shortly after Donald Trump took office she moved with her family to Oaxaca and covered Mexico–United States relations, the migrant caravan, and Mexico’s efforts to grapple with Trump. Conniff is a frequent guest on MSNBC and has appeared on Good Morning America, Democracy Now!, Wisconsin Public Radio, CNN, Fox News and many other radio and television outlets. She has also written for The Nation, The New York Times, The Washington Post, and The Los Angeles Times, among other publications.

In 2022 Conniff Published her first book, Milked: How an American Crisis Brought Together Midwestern Dairy Farmers and Mexican Workers, described by critics as "A compelling portrayal by the veteran journalist of the lives of farming communities on either side of the U.S.-Mexico border and the surprising connections between them"

== Personal life ==
Conniff resides in Maple Bluff, Wisconsin.
