= Crossfire (American TV program) =

American debate television program

- Genre: Talk show; News program
- Presented by: Tom Braden; Pat Buchanan; Robert Novak; Michael Kinsley; John Sununu; Bob Beckel; Tony Snow; Lynne Cheney; Geraldine Ferraro; Bill Press; Mary Matalin; Tucker Carlson; Paul Begala; James Carville; Newt Gingrich; S. E. Cupp; Stephanie Cutter; Van Jones; Wolf Blitzer
- Country of origin: United States

Production
- Camera setup: Multi-camera
- Running time: 30 minutes; 60 minutes (2002)

Original release
- Network: CNN
- Release: June 25, 1982 – June 3, 2005
- Release: September 9, 2013 – August 6, 2014

Related
- The Situation Room

Crossfire is an American nightly current event debate television program that aired on CNN from June 25, 1982, to June 3, 2005, and again from September 9, 2013, to August 6, 2014. The format was designed to present and challenge the opinions of a politically liberal pundit and a conservative pundit.

After eight years off the air, a revival of Crossfire launched on September 9, 2013. The panelists for the new edition of Crossfire were former House speaker Newt Gingrich and political commentator S. E. Cupp representing the right with political consultant Stephanie Cutter and advocate Van Jones representing the left. The program was last broadcast in July 2014 and officially cancelled later that year.

== Format ==
The show is hosted by two pundits, one of whom is presented as being "on the left" and one "on the right," to provide two sides of the political spectrum. The show usually features two additional "left and right" guests on each topic of discussion. On some occasions only one guest is featured. Occasionally, when the co-hosts agree on the featured topic, two guests of the opposing view appear. More rarely, when hosts disagree with the prevailing view of their side, they debate someone from their own camp who agrees with it.

== History ==
=== Braden–Buchanan years ===
The concept began in 1978 when Tom Braden and Pat Buchanan co-hosted a radio show on then-NBC-owned WRC radio in Washington. The program, on which the two men debated political issues, was highly praised, but its ratings were low and, in 1982, it was cancelled. At the time, Reese Schonfeld, then President and CEO of CNN, was searching for a replacement for his 10pm program. The program put the day's most important newsmaker in the spotlight, caught between a conservative and a liberal journalist. Their ratings, which were low by radio standards, were better than CNN's. Schonfeld signed the pair to a CNN contract for $75,000 each.

CNN's owner, Ted Turner, objected to their hiring but Braden and Buchanan, with a signed contract, threatened a lawsuit. Turner backed down and agreed to give them a half hour at 11:30pm.

The program's original producer was Randy Douthit. It was executive produced by CNN's leading female executive, Gail Evans. The show soon gained ratings and was elevated to a 7:30pm time slot. In 1985, Buchanan left the show for a job as communications director in the Reagan White House. His replacement was conservative columnist Robert Novak, who already had a talk show on CNN and was at the time also a regular on The McLaughlin Group. In 1987, Buchanan returned to the show, replacing Novak. In 1989, Braden was replaced by Michael Kinsley, a liberal columnist for Time magazine, and editor of The New Republic.

=== Later years ===
In late 1991, Buchanan left the program to pursue the 1992 Republican Party nomination for the presidency, and was replaced by John Sununu in the conservative seat. Buchanan returned in 1993 and alternated with Sununu. In 1995, Buchanan again left the show to pursue an unsuccessful bid for the 1996 Republican nomination for president. Novak returned to the show alternating with Sununu on the right. At about the same time, CNN began a weekend edition of the show, Crossfire Sunday. The initial hosts were Bob Beckel on the left and Tony Snow on the right. After a few months Snow left for the newly formed Fox News Channel, to be replaced by Lynne Cheney.

Kinsley left the show at the end of 1995 and in early 1996, CNN selected two hosts to alternate on the left: Geraldine Ferraro and Bill Press. In 1997, Buchanan again returned to the program, replacing Novak on the right. At the end of the year Ferraro left the program and Press became the full-time representative of the left. A month later Sununu left the show, and Novak returned alternating with Buchanan. In February 1998, Crossfire Sunday was cancelled.

In 1999, Buchanan left the show for the last time and Mary Matalin was his replacement, alternating with Novak on the right. However, the show began to lose its audience, with the increasing popularity of alternatives like Hannity and Colmes on the Fox News Channel and Hardball on MSNBC. In 2001, Matalin left the program to join the White House staff and she was replaced by Tucker Carlson.

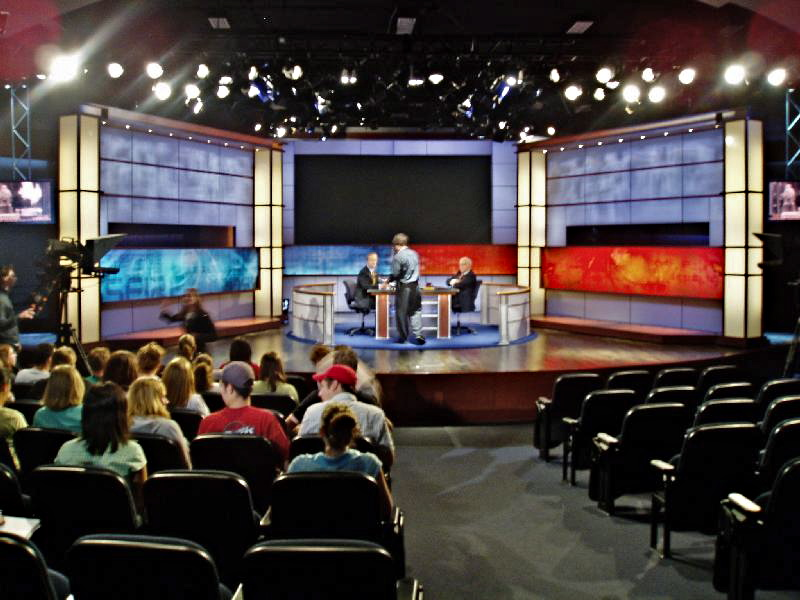
Crossfire studio at the George Washington University in 2005

In 2002, the length of the program was increased to an hour. The show was presented live from George Washington University in Washington, D.C., and featured a live studio audience. Novak and Carlson retained their slots as alternating hosts on the right. Paul Begala and James Carville replaced Press on the left. The new style did not rate well, and in April 2003, Crossfire was reduced back to just half an hour and moved from prime-time to an afternoon slot.

=== Jon Stewart's appearance ===
On October 15, 2004, Jon Stewart, then host of The Daily Show, appeared on the program to promote his book America (The Book): A Citizen's Guide to Democracy Inaction. He used his appearance on the show to raise criticisms of the format of Crossfire and the style of arguments presented on the show. He said the program failed its responsibility to the public discourse and indulged in partisan hackery, reducing news coverage of important issues to a series of talking points from both extremes of the political spectrum: "It's hurting America. Here is what I wanted to tell you guys: Stop."

Carlson attempted to counter Stewart's criticisms by reading examples of softball questions Stewart had asked of then-presidential candidate John Kerry during his recent interview on The Daily Show, such as "How are you holding up?" and "Is it hard not to take [the attacks] personally?" Stewart argued that unlike Carlson and Begala he was a comedian, not a journalist, and therefore it was not his role to conduct hard-hitting interviews. Begala defended the show on the basis that it was intended as a forum for debate, to which Stewart responded that calling Crossfire a debate show was "like saying pro wrestling is a show about athletic competition." During the exchange, Carlson told Stewart, "I do think you're more fun on your show. Just my opinion," to which Stewart replied, "You know what's interesting, though? You're as big a dick on your show as you are on any show."

Following his appearance, transcripts and live stream footage were released on the Internet and widely watched and discussed. At a time when the average number of viewers of the show was about 615,000, the episode drew 867,000 viewers. Stewart later stated "It really was not my intent to be disruptive. I truly thought we'd have a goof about how terrible the program is at the top, and move on, but . . . the combination of their obstinance and my low blood sugar led to no bueno."

=== Cancellation ===
An older logo of the series

In January 2005, the new president and CEO of CNN Jonathan Klein announced the cancellation of Crossfire. Klein also announced that they would not be renewing Carlson's contract. Carlson claimed it was he who had chosen to leave, to take a job at MSNBC. In the news release containing the announcement, Klein indicated that he wanted to change the tone of shows on the network, and in interviews said he sympathized with Jon Stewart's criticisms of Crossfire. Klein claimed he "wanted to move CNN away from what he called 'head-butting debate shows'." The last episode aired on June 3, 2005 and the Crossfire pundits began appearing on Inside Politics the following Monday before relocating to that show's successor, The Situation Room. However, the GWU Crossfire set remained in use for the CNN weekend program On the Story, which had an audience interaction format.

=== Revival ===
A revival of Crossfire was announced on June 26, 2013, for a premiere in late 2013, with panelists Newt Gingrich, S. E. Cupp, Stephanie Cutter, and Van Jones. CNN announced a launch of September 9, at the end of the Congressional recess and probable proposal by the White House to take some action against Syria.

The new version differed from the original version in that the final segment, called "Cease Fire," will offer "an opportunity for hosts to look for common ground at the end of the program." There is also no audience, putting aside the format in the first version's iteration in the last few years to prevent the panelists from "playing for the audience".

Due to CNN's coverage of the Malaysia Airlines Flight 370 disappearance, Crossfire was placed on "temporary hiatus" on March 11, 2014; an additional half-hour of The Situation Room was aired in its place. Crossfire returned to CNN's lineup on May 1, 2014. Following the Malaysia Airlines Flight 17 incident in mid-July 2014, Crossfire was placed on hiatus again. On October 15, 2014, which coincidentally was the ten-year anniversary of Stewart's appearance, the show was officially cancelled for a second time.

== See also ==
- Crossballs
- Firing Line
- The McLaughlin Group

== Sources ==
- Bauder, David (January 5, 2005). "CNN Lets 'Crossfire' Host Carlson Go". USA Today. Associated Press. Archived from the original on December 24, 2005.
