= Margaret Carlson =

American journalist

- Born: Margaret Bresnahan; November 29
- Education: Bishop McDevitt High School; Pennsylvania State University, B.A.; George Washington University Law School, J.D.
- Spouse: Eugene Carlson (m. 1972, divorced)
- Children: 1
- Parents: James Francis Xavier Bresnahan; Mary Catherine McCreary
- Awards: Belva Ann Lockwood Award (2011)

Margaret Carlson is an American journalist, political pundit, and an opinion columnist for Bloomberg News. She is known for being the first female columnist for Time magazine. She was a regular panelist for CNN's Capital Gang from 1992 until its cancellation in 2005.

== Early life, family and education ==
Margaret Carlson was born Margaret Bresnahan to James Francis Xavier Bresnahan and Mary Catherine McCreary Bresnahan. She graduated from Bishop McDevitt High School in Harrisburg, Pennsylvania.

Carlson earned a B.A. degree in English from Penn State University, then worked for several years before earning a J.D. degree from George Washington University Law School in Washington, D.C.

Carlson has one daughter, Courtney Anne Carlson. She also has 3 grandchildren.

== Career ==
Carlson spent a year after college working at the U.S. Department of Labor and three other agencies. She subsequently taught third grade in Watts, Los Angeles, California, before joining Nader's raiders. After law school, she was briefly a Federal Trade Commission lawyer under Michael Pertschuk, until the Carter administration ended.

Her journalism career has included stints as Washington bureau chief for Esquire, editor of the short-lived Washington Weekly, and was a reporter and member of the editorial staff for the Washington-based national weekly newspaper "Legal Times." She was managing editor at The New Republic until January 1988, when she joined Time magazine. In 1994, she became the first female columnist in the magazine's history. Carlson covered four presidential elections for Time, but in 2005 she left for Bloomberg News where she writes a column.

At CNN she was a commentator on Inside Politics and, for 15 years, a panelist on The Capital Gang. She writes a weekly column for The Daily Beast.

== Bibliography ==
- Carlson, Margaret (2003). Anyone Can Grow Up: How George Bush and I Made It to the White House. Simon & Schuster. ISBN 0-684-80890-0. LCCN 2003042461.
- Carlson, Margaret. Anyone Can Grow Up: How George Bush and I Made it to the White House.
- Carlson, Margaret Bresnahan; Shafer, Ronald G. (1973). How to Get Your Car Repaired without Getting Gypped. Harrow books. New York: Harper & Row. ISBN 0-06-087035-4.
