= Al Hunt =

American journalist

- Al Hunt in 2026 at Politics and Prose bookstore
- Born: Albert Reinold Hunt Jr. December 4, 1942 (age 83); Charlottesville, Virginia, U.S.
- Education: Wake Forest University (BA)
- Occupations: Executive editor, news anchor
- Notable credit(s): Bloomberg News's Washington editor, anchor of Political Capital on Bloomberg Television
- Spouse: Judy Woodruff (m. 1980)
- Children: 3

Albert Reinold Hunt Jr. (born December 4, 1942) is an American journalist. He was a columnist for Bloomberg View, the editorial arm of Bloomberg News. Hunt hosted the Sunday morning talk show Political Capital on Bloomberg Television and was also a weekly panelist on CNN's Capital Gang and Evans, Novak, Hunt & Shields. For decades, he worked in the Washington, D.C. bureau, reporting for the Wall Street Journal.

== Early life ==
Hunt was born in Charlottesville, Virginia. He graduated from the Haverford School in Haverford, Pennsylvania, in 1960. He attended Wake Forest University, where he earned a bachelor's degree in political science in 1965 and worked for the Old Gold & Black.

== Career ==
Before graduating from Wake Forest University, Hunt worked for the Philadelphia Bulletin and the Winston-Salem Journal. In 1965, he became a reporter for The Wall Street Journal in New York, before transferring to its Boston bureau in 1967, then to the Washington, D.C., bureau in 1969.

Before joining Bloomberg News in January 2005, Hunt worked for The Wall Street Journal. During his 35 years in its Washington bureau, he was a congressional and national political reporter, a bureau chief and, most recently, executive Washington editor. For 11 years, Hunt wrote the weekly column "Politics & People." He also directed the paper's political polls for 20 years and served as president of the Dow Jones Newspaper Fund and a board member of Ottaway Newspapers Inc., a Dow Jones subsidiary.

In October 2014, Charlie Rose introduced a segment called "Al Hunt on the Story" as a "regular feature interview"; Hunt's first interview under this banner was with Secretary of State John Kerry.

Hunt is a member of Wake Forest University's board of trustees and the board of the Children's Charities in Washington, and has been an advisory board member of the Joan Shorenstein Center on the Press, Politics and Public Policy at Harvard University. He teaches a course on the press and politics at the University of Pennsylvania's Annenberg School of Communications. On June 18, 2008, Hunt was one of 10 people chosen to remember journalist Tim Russert, who had died days before, at his memorial service at Kennedy Center for the Performing Arts.

== Appearances ==
Hunt has also served as a periodic panelist on NBC's Meet the Press and PBS's Washington Week in Review, as well as a political analyst on CBS Morning News and a weekly panelist on CNN's Capital Gang. He was also a panelist on Evans, Novak, Hunt & Shields. He is co-author of a series of books published by the American Enterprise Institute, including The American Elections of 1980, The American Elections of 1982, and The American Elections of 1984. In 1987, he co-authored Elections American Style for the Brookings Institution.

== Awards ==
In 1999, Hunt received the William Allen White Foundation's national citation, one of the highest honors in journalism. In 1995, he and his wife, Judy Woodruff, received the Allen H. Neuharth Award for Excellence in Journalism from the University of South Dakota. In 1976, Hunt received a Raymond Clapper Award for Washington reporting.

== Personal life ==
Hunt has been married twice. He was first married to Margaret O'Toole of Pittsburgh. In 1980, he married Judy Woodruff of PBS. Together they have three children, including a son born with spina bifida.

== See also ==
- 1980 United States presidential election
- United States elections, 1982
- 1984 United States presidential election

== Notes ==
1. "1986: A Life-Changing Year", The Washington Post, July 25, 1999
