= Mark Shields =

American political columnist and commentator (1937–2022)

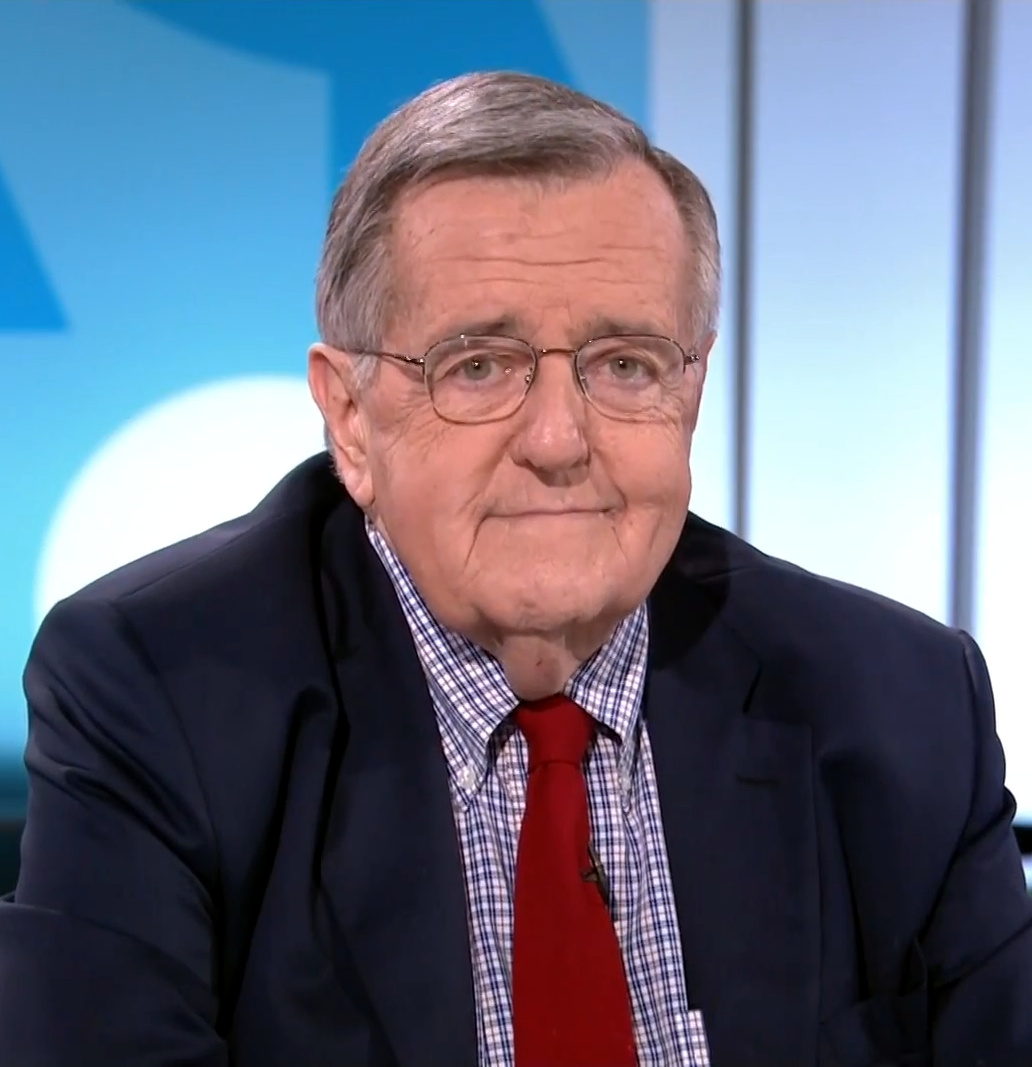
- Shields in 2016
- Born: Mark Stephen Shields; May 25, 1937; Weymouth, Massachusetts, U.S.
- Died: June 18, 2022 (aged 85); Chevy Chase, Maryland, U.S.
- Education: University of Notre Dame (BA)
- Occupations: Political analyst, journalist
- Years active: 1962–2020
- Political party: Democratic
- Spouse: Anne Hudson (m. 1966)
- Children: 1
- Military career
- Allegiance: United States
- Branch: United States Marine Corps
- Service years: 1960–1962
- Rank: Lance corporal

Mark Stephen Shields (May 25, 1937 – June 18, 2022) was an American political columnist, advisor, and commentator. He worked in leadership positions for many Democratic candidates' electoral campaigns.

Shields provided weekly political analysis and commentary for the PBS NewsHour from 1988 to 2020. His on-screen counterpart from 2001 to 2020 was David Brooks of The New York Times. Previous counterparts were William Safire, Paul Gigot of The Wall Street Journal, and David Gergen. Shields was also a regular panelist on Inside Washington, a weekly public affairs show that was seen on both PBS and ABC until it ceased production in December 2013. Shields was moderator and panelist on CNN's Capital Gang for 17 years.

== Early life and education ==
Mark Shields on PBS NewsHour on April 29, 2016

Shields was born on May 25, 1937, and raised in Weymouth, Massachusetts, in an Irish Catholic family, the son of Mary (Fallon), a schoolteacher, and William Shields, a paper salesman, who was involved in local politics. He graduated from the University of Notre Dame in 1959 with a bachelor's degree in philosophy.

== Career ==
In the early 1960s, Shields enlisted in the United States Marine Corps in Florida. He was a lance corporal before he was discharged in 1962.

Shields was based in Washington D.C. from 1965, initially working as an aide to Wisconsin Senator William Proxmire. Shields joined Robert F. Kennedy's presidential campaign in 1968. He later held leadership positions in the presidential campaigns of Edmund Muskie and Morris Udall, and was political director for Sargent Shriver when he ran for Vice President of the United States on the Democratic ticket in 1972. Over more than a decade, he helped manage state and local campaigns in some 38 states, including incumbent Boston mayor Kevin White's successful re-election campaign in 1975.

In 1979, Shields became an editorial writer for The Washington Post. The same year, he began writing a column which was distributed nationally by Creators Syndicate. He covered 12 presidential campaigns and attended 24 national party conventions. He taught U.S. politics and the press at the University of Pennsylvania's Wharton School and Georgetown University's McCourt School of Public Policy. In addition he was a fellow at the Harvard Institute of Politics at Harvard Kennedy School.

Shields was a regular political commentator on the PBS NewsHour from 1988 to 2020. Anchorwoman Judy Woodruff announced on the December 14, 2020, edition of the NewsHour that Shields would be leaving the show as a regular analyst after its December 18 edition. During Shields's last regular appearance on December 18, Woodruff added that he would remain an occasional contributor to the NewsHour during important political news and events.

Shields was the author of On the Campaign Trail, about the 1984 presidential campaign.

== Personal life ==
Shields married Anne Hudson, who is a lawyer and former civil service official at the United States Department of the Interior, in 1966. The couple have a daughter, Amy Shields Doyle, and two grandchildren.

He was on the board of directors of SOME (So Others Might Eat) and he established the William and Mary Shields Scholarship Program in honor of his parents at the University of Notre Dame for students who are the first members of their families to go to college.

Shields was a Catholic.

== Death ==
Shields died from kidney failure at his home in Chevy Chase, Maryland, on June 18, 2022, aged 85.
