= Cuomo =

Cuomo (/ˈkwoʊmoʊ/ KWOH-moh, Italian: [ˈkwɔːmo]) is an Italian surname. Notable people with the surname include:

- Politically involved Cuomo family, in the United States
  - Mario Cuomo (1932–2015), governor of New York (1983–1995)
  - Matilda Cuomo (born 1931), first lady of New York (1983–1995)
    - Margaret Cuomo (born 1955), American radiologist and author
    - Andrew Cuomo (born 1957), governor of New York (2011–2021)
    - Chris Cuomo (born 1970), American journalist
- Chris Cuomo (philosopher), American philosopher
- Domenico Cuomo (born 2004), Italian actor
- Donna Cuomo (born 1947), member of the Massachusetts House of Representatives (1993–1999)
- Douglas J. Cuomo (born 1958), American composer
- Franco Cuomo (1938–2007), Italian journalist
- George Michael Cuomo (1929–2015), American author
- Gianluca Cuomo (born 1993), American soccer player
- Giovanni Cuomo (1874–1948), Italian politician, lawyer and educator
- Giuseppe Cuomo (born 1998), Italian footballer
- Jerry Cuomo (born 1962), American software engineer
- Leandro Cuomo (born 1996), Argentine footballer
- Luigi Cuomo (1905–1993), Italian fencer
- Nancy Cuomo (born 1946), Italian singer
- Rivers Cuomo (born 1970), American musician and frontman of the band Weezer
- Salvatore Cuomo (born 1972), Italian-Japanese chef
- Sandro Cuomo (born 1962), Italian fencer
- Serafina Cuomo (born 1966), Italian historian
- Yolanda Cuomo (born 1957), American artist

== See also ==
- Cuomo (disambiguation)
- Governor Cuomo (disambiguation)
