= National Organization of Italian American Women =

The National Organization of Italian American Women (NOIAW) was founded in 1980 to develop a national network of Italian American women of diverse professional backgrounds.

== History ==
Through the invitation of Dr. Aileen Riotto Sirey and the encouragement of Geraldine A Ferraro a small group of Italian American women met at Dr. Sirey's home on July 14, 1980 to start the group. The founding members included Aileen Riotto Sirey, then-U.S. Representative from New York Geraldine Ferraro, Matilda Cuomo (wife of Mario Cuomo, then Lieutenant Governor of New York), Donna deMatteo, Bonnie Mandina and Roseanne Colletti. The group sought to create a national network to support the educational and professional aspirations of its members, and to combat ethnic stereotypes by promoting positive role models. Riotto Sirey was the first President for 7 years and Chairwoman for 25 years retiring on May 5, 2012 with the title Founder and Chair Emerita.

By 1986, the organization had more than 400 members across 10 states, with 1500 people on its mailing list.

== Programs ==
NOIAW-sponsored events are educational, cultural and social in nature and focus on issues of interest to Italian American women. The programs recognize and promote the accomplishments and contributions of women of Italian ancestry as well as acknowledge women as keepers of the culture.

The group awards scholarships. In 2007 the NOIAW joined with the Italian Foreign Ministry, to establish an Exchange Program. Under this program Italian students spend two weeks as guests of the organization and on alternate years Italian American College students go to Italy. The organization awards scholarships each year to Italian American women for pursuit of higher education. NOIAW is committed to preserving Italian heritage, language, and culture while simultaneously promoting and supporting the advancement of women of Italian ancestry. Through its mentor program, NOIAW matches graduate and undergraduate students and women returning to the work force, with NOIAW members in the same field who provide guidance and ongoing support.

NOIAW has evolved into an international organization bringing together women of Italian ancestry throughout the United States with women in Italy, Argentina and Australia through international events and conferences.

== Notable board members ==
- Lidia Matticchio Bastianich
- Margaret I. Cuomo
- Matilda Raffa Cuomo
- Geraldine Ferraro
- Rosa L. DeLauro
- Nancy Pelosi
