= Maria Cuomo =

Maria Cuomo may refer to:

- Maria "Nancy" Cuomo (born 1946), Italian singer
- Maria Cuomo Cole (born 1960), American film producer and philanthropist

== See also ==
- Maria (given name)
- Cuomo (surname)
