= A Tale of Two Cities (speech) =

1984 speech by New York Governor Mario Cuomo

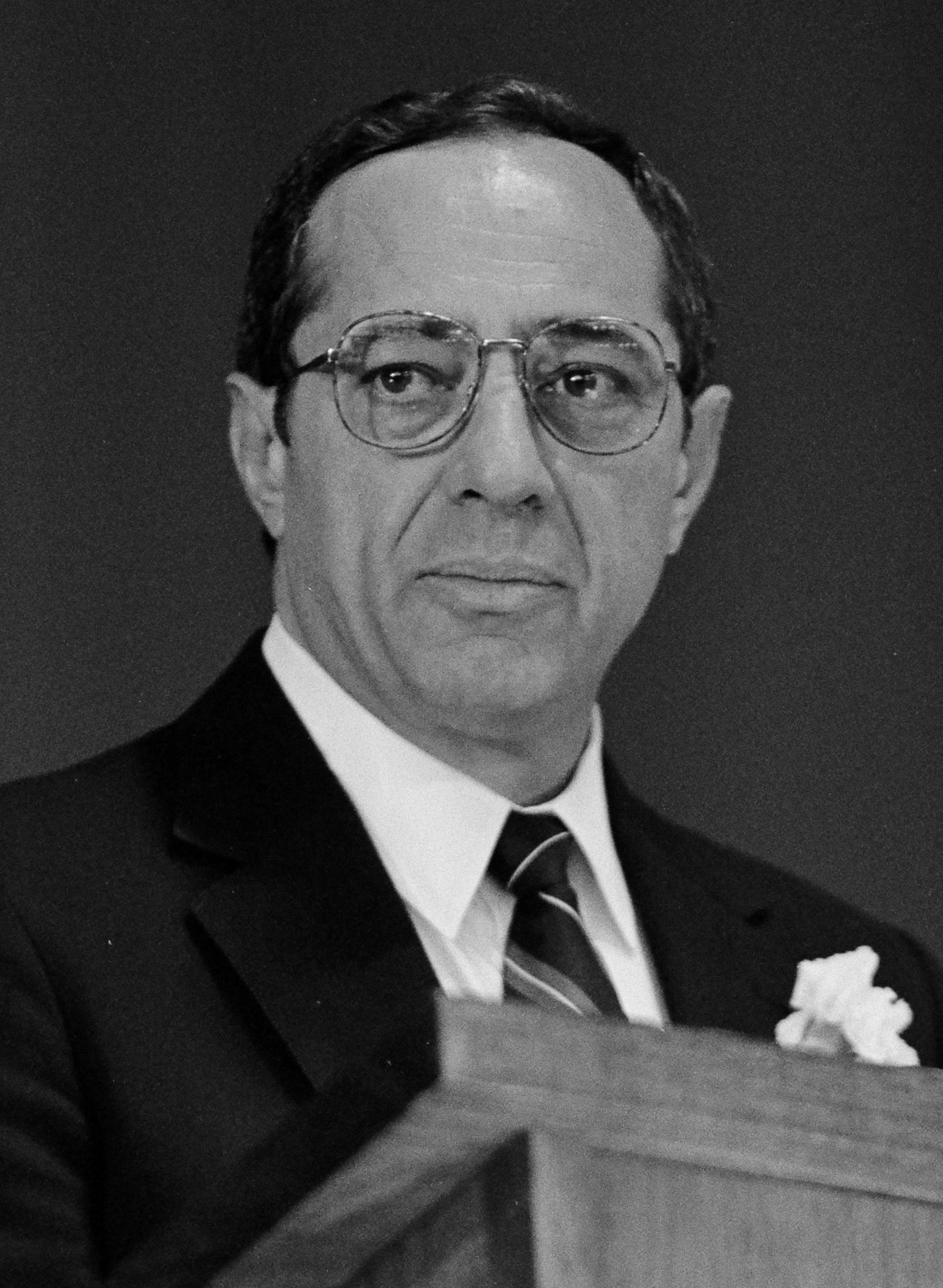
New York Governor Mario Cuomo (pictured in 1987) delivered A Tale of Two Cities.

A Tale of Two Cities is a speech given by New York Governor Mario Cuomo on July 16, 1984, at the Democratic National Convention in San Francisco, California. The speech captured widespread attention and was viewed by nearly 80 million people on television. It boosted Cuomo's reputation and he became a national leader of the Democratic party. It was delivered as the keynote address of the convention.

== Background ==
Mario Cuomo was elected Governor of New York on a Democratic Party ticket in 1982. In his inaugural address, he constructed Democratic values metaphorically as caring for a family. The speech was well received by members of both the Democratic and Republican parties, and displayed Cuomo's skill as an orator. Throughout his first year as Governor, Cuomo supported numerous liberal policies even as conservatism was growing in popularity, garnering him national attention. A presidential election was scheduled to take place in the United States in November 1984. President Ronald Reagan was a popular conservative and was widely projected to win reelection. Though the country had endured economic hardship early on in his term, by 1984 the situation had begun to improve.

In March 1984 Gary Hart, a senator seeking the Democratic Party's nomination for the presidential election, openly citing inspiration from Cuomo, stated, "I'd like to talk about the family of America." The governor, however, had endorsed leading candidate Walter Mondale. Mondale inquired as Cuomo's interest in joining his campaign to seek the Vice Presidency. Cuomo stated that he had promised to finish his four-year term as governor, but indicated that he would not be opposed to delivering the keynote address at the 1984 Democratic National Convention (DNC) in San Francisco, California. Mondale thought he was the best choice for the role, as he believed Cuomo could win him the support of Italian Americans as well as the so-called "Cuomo majority", a coalition of black, Hispanic, white liberal, and labor unionist voters that supported his gubernatorial campaign. Others hoped Cuomo could win over Democrats who had voted for Reagan in 1980 as well as independent voters. The governor had promised former President Jimmy Carter that he would assist Mondale (Carter's vice president) any way he could, and Mondale told him, "If you want to help me, you'll give the speech."

Cuomo did not believe he had a high enough national profile for such an event and felt that Senator Ted Kennedy would make for a better speaker. Mondale expressed disdain towards the suggestion. Michael Del Giudice, the governor's chief of staff, urged Cuomo to accept the offer, believing it was a good opportunity for him to express his beliefs and a chance to bolster Mondale's support. Del Giudice felt that even if the speech had an unimpressive reception, it would not cause Mondale's campaign significant harm. David W. Burke thought delivering the keynote was a bad idea and cautioned against it. Cuomo's son, Andrew, and his communications director, Tim Russert, shared the governor's anxieties that a bad performance would reflect poorly on him and damage his own political prospects. Nevertheless, they encouraged him to take up the role of keynote speaker.

Kennedy was upset that Mondale did not want him to be the keynote speaker and stated that the person chosen for the role should be among the Democrats who had remained neutral during the presidential primaries. Cuomo agreed in principle, and told Mondale's staff that if he were ultimately made keynote speaker it would have to be made clear to Kennedy that Cuomo had thought he was a better fit and that he had been chosen at the behest of Mondale. On the evening of June 20, Kennedy called Cuomo over the phone. Cuomo stated that he had turned down Mondale's offer and tried to convince him to select the senator instead. Kennedy said he had heard from Mondale's aides that Mondale wanted Cuomo to give the speech, and said "I am calling, Mario, to say I think you should say yes. I can't think of anyone better...if they get back to you, you ought to say yes. I will do whatever they want me to do." By the end of the conversation, Cuomo was persuaded to accept the role of keynote speaker. An hour later he received a phone call from Mondale and DNC Chairman Charles Manatt. According to Cuomo, he then realized they had coordinated with Kennedy to try and convince him to deliver the keynote. The governor wrote in his diary, "They tried very hard to sound warm, sincere, and endearing, and none of it worked." Cuomo accepted Mondale's renewed offer, though he voiced his belief that the candidate had made a mistake. Cuomo was officially announced as the DNC keynote speaker on June 21. He was the first New Yorker to be designated the role since Martin H. Glynn in 1916.

Andrew Cuomo and Russert reviewed footage of past convention keynote addresses to devise a strategy for maximizing the speech's resonance with the audience. Mario Cuomo spent several days sifting through various ideas and determining his argument. He penned a draft on July 7. Lawyer Mark Green and journalist Jack Newfield both offered suggestions for the language. Cuomo read numerous versions aloud in the dining room of the New York State Executive Mansion to his advisers and went through up to 60 different drafts before he was "comfortable" with the work. When he felt it was nearly finished, he presented it to his staff in the press room of the governor's office in 2 World Trade Center. They were unmoved, so he revised his argument by moving his criticism of Reagan's policies from the middle of the speech to the beginning. Cuomo delivered it again, but Andrew voiced his concern that the ending was not rhetorically potent. Cuomo's chief speechwriter, Peter Quinn, then read through the governor's diaries to find a life event he could write about. Quinn settled on incorporating a story of Cuomo's father, an Italian immigrant, working long shifts at his grocery store until his feet bled.

== Prelude ==
Cuomo arrived in San Francisco around 12:00 am on July 15. Later in the morning he went to the George R. Moscone Convention Center, the venue for the DNC, to rehearse his speech. He sat in the empty convention hall and made several late edits to the transcript—the copy supplied for the teleprompter was marked with numerous hand-written revisions. The governor told the press "It won't be a tub-thumper but rather a methodical attempt to deal with the issues. I'm not good at bringing people to their feet. I'm going to try to bring people to their senses."

The address was scheduled for July 16, and it would be Cuomo's first major appearance on national television. He was introduced in a fashion unusual for the time: before he took the stage, a six-minute film about his upbringing in New York was played. Andrew Cuomo and Russert, having observed the ambivalence of the crowds in past convention footage and fearing it would impact television viewers' reception, believed the video would make the audience more attentive to the governor's speech. Following the introduction, the lights in the convention center darkened and a single spotlight tracked Cuomo as he walked over to the podium. This was also designed to capture the audience's focus, as well as to force the television news cameras to follow the governor instead of panning over the crowd. The Secret Service agents providing security thought dimming the lights would leave the convention more vulnerable to a gunman and objected. Andrew Cuomo argued with them by the control room operator to have the action carried out. The governor later said that he was "not happy about being there" and "very eager to get it over with".

== The speech ==
Cuomo's address was entitled A Tale of Two Cities. It was 4,308 words in length. Cuomo opened by invoking his family rhetoric, emphasizing the inclusiveness and openness of his message. He dismissed "the stories and the poetry" for which he was well known and declared his intent to be forthright:

On behalf of the great Empire State and the whole family of New York, let me thank you for the great privilege of being able to address this convention. Please allow me to skip the stories and the poetry and the temptation to deal in nice but vague rhetoric. Let me instead use this valuable opportunity to deal immediately with the questions that should determine this election and that we all know are vital to the American people.

Cuomo proceeded to bring his audience's attention to a recent statement by Reagan at a campaign event and aimed to highlight a contradiction he saw in the president's use of the phrase "shining city on a hill": (Note: "Shining city on a hill" was one of President Reagan's favorite phrases and he used it frequently. It was derived from a statement written by John Winthrop in 1630 concerning the founding of the Massachusetts Bay Colony: "For we must consider that we shall be as a City upon a Hill. The eyes of all people are upon us." Winthrop was alluding to Matthew 5:13–16 in the Bible, which read "Ye are the light of the world. A city that is set on a hill cannot be hid." President John F. Kennedy, a Democrat, had employed the "city on a hill" metaphor in 1961, but Reagan popularized it.)

Ten days ago, President Reagan admitted that although some people in this country seemed to be doing well nowadays, others were unhappy, even worried, about themselves, their families, and their futures. The President said that he didn't understand that fear. He said, "Why, this country is a shining city on a hill." And the President is right. In many ways we are a shining city on a hill. But the hard truth is that not everyone is sharing in this city's splendor and glory.

Cuomo then attacked Reagan's rhetoric by using imagery to craft an actuality in stark contrast to his vision. He listed specific, dramatic examples of exceptions to the president's notions:

A shining city is perhaps all the President sees from the portico of the White House and the veranda of his ranch, where everyone seems to be doing well. But there's another city; there's another part to the shining the city; the part where some people can't pay their mortgages, and most young people can't afford one; where students can't afford the education they need, and middle-class parents watch the dreams they hold for their children evaporate. In this part of the city there are more poor than ever, more families in trouble, more and more people who need help but can't find it. Even worse: There are elderly people who tremble in the basements of the houses there. And there are people who sleep in the city streets, in the gutter, where the glitter doesn't show. There are ghettos where thousands of young people, without a job or an education, give their lives away to drug dealers every day.

He subsequently addressed Reagan directly, sardonically calling him "Mr. President", and encapsulating his own message of vast inequality in America in a metaphorical allusion to Charles Dickens's novel, A Tale of Two Cities:

There is despair, Mr. President, in the faces that you don't see, in the places that you don't visit in your shining city. In fact, Mr. President, this is a nation—Mr. President you ought to know that this nation is more "A Tale of Two Cities" than it is just a "Shining City on a Hill."

Cuomo followed by suggesting that Reagan was unfamiliar with the realities of most Americans' lives and listing places—locations where people had not benefited from economic recovery—he could go to view such realities. This undermined the president's credibility and conjured up a series of emotional images. He utilized anaphora for emphasis:

Maybe, maybe, Mr. President, if you visited some more places; maybe if you went to Appalachia where some people still live in sheds; maybe if you went to Lackawanna where thousands of unemployed steel workers wonder why we subsidized foreign steel. Maybe—Maybe, Mr. President, if you stopped in at a shelter in Chicago and spoke to the homeless there; maybe, Mr. President, if you asked a woman who had been denied the help she needed to feed her children because you said you needed the money for a tax break for a millionaire or for a missile we couldn't afford to use.

Cuomo paused as the audience applauded. He sarcastically utilized spin to accuse Reagan of explicitly endorsing the philosophy of Social Darwinism:

Maybe—Maybe, Mr. President. But I'm afraid not. Because the truth is, ladies and gentlemen, that this is how we were warned it would be. President Reagan told us from the very beginning that he believed in a kind of Social Darwinism. Survival of the fittest. "Government can't do everything," we were told, so it should settle for taking care of the strong and hope that economic ambition and charity will do the rest. Make the rich richer, and what falls from the table will be enough for the middle class and those who are trying desperately to work their way into the middle class.

Cuomo proceeded to compare Republicans to President Herbert Hoover, whose tenure was marked by the Great Depression and who was widely perceived as having done little to assist those struggling economically. By drawing a parallel, the governor was suggesting the Republican Party—and by extension, Reagan—would do just as much:

You know, the Republicans called it "trickle-down" when Hoover tried it. Now they call it "supply side." But it's the same shining city for those relative few who are lucky enough to live in its good neighborhoods. But for the people who are excluded, for the people who are locked out, all they can do is stare from a distance at that city's glimmering towers.

He then brought the Democratic Party into his discussion and asserted—using extensive imagery with an analogy of a wagon train—that it more genuinely upheld family values. He also alluded to the biblical phrase, "The meek shall inherit the earth", to further attack Republican philosophy:

It's an old story. It's as old as our history. The difference between Democrats and Republicans has always been measured in courage and confidence. The Republicans—The Republicans believe that the wagon train will not make it to the frontier unless some of the old, some of the young, some of the weak are left behind by the side of the trail. "The strong—The strong," they tell us, "will inherit the land."

Enunciating his claim that Democrats supported family values, Cuomo invoked Franklin D. Roosevelt—widely admired by Democrats—highlighting his efforts as president and suggesting that his physical disability would make him a victim of Republican policy. He also emotionally celebrated Democratic social accomplishments:

We Democrats believe in something else. We Democrats believe that we can make it all the way with the whole family intact, and we have more than once. Ever since Franklin Roosevelt lifted himself from his wheelchair to lift this nation from its knees—wagon train after wagon train—to new frontiers of education, housing, peace; the whole family aboard, constantly reaching out to extend and enlarge that family; lifting them up into the wagon on the way; blacks and Hispanics, and people of every ethnic group, and native Americans—all those struggling to build their families and claim some small share of America. For nearly 50 years we carried them all to new levels of comfort, and security, and dignity, even affluence. And remember this, some of us in this room today are here only because this nation had that kind of confidence. And it would be wrong to forget that. So, here we are at this convention to remind ourselves where we come from and to claim the future for ourselves and for our children. Today our great Democratic Party, which has saved this nation from depression, from fascism, from racism, from corruption, is called upon to do it again—this time to save the nation from confusion and division, from the threat of eventual fiscal disaster, and most of all from the fear of a nuclear holocaust.

Conceding Reagan's strengths as a communicator, the governor provided a plan for Democrats to garner electoral support and returned to the "Tale of Two Cities" theme:

That's not going to be easy. Mo Udall is exactly right—it won't be easy. And in order to succeed, we must answer our opponent's polished and appealing rhetoric with a more telling reasonableness and rationality. We must win this case on the merits. We must get the American public to look past the glitter, beyond the showmanship to the reality, the hard substance of things. And we'll do it not so much with speeches that sound good as with speeches that are good and sound; not so much with speeches that will bring people to their feet as with speeches that will bring people to their senses. We must make—We must make the American people hear our "Tale of Two Cities." We must convince them that we don't have to settle for two cities, that we can have one city, indivisible, shining for all of its people.

Next Cuomo, invoking the biblical Tower of Babel, warned against factitious disagreement and urged Democrats to support party unity. He used alliteration for emphasis:

Now, we will have no chance to do that if what comes out of this convention is a babel of arguing voices. If that's what's heard throughout the campaign, dissident sounds from all sides, we will have no chance to tell our message. To succeed we will have to surrender some small parts of our individual interests, to build a platform that we can all stand on, at once, and comfortably—proudly singing out. We need—We need a platform we can all agree to so that we can sing out the truth for the nation to hear, in chorus, its logic so clear and commanding that no slick Madison Avenue commercial, no amount of geniality, no martial music will be able to muffle the sound of the truth.

The address was interrupted 52 times by applause.

== Aftermath and reception ==
The audience enthusiastically applauded the address. As Cuomo descended from the stage, he asked his son, "How'd it go?" Andrew grabbed his shoulders and responded, "They love you!" Though many journalists attempted to interview him, Cuomo departed in the evening and flew back to the Executive Mansion in Albany, New York. He later attributed the apparent success of the speech to the audience, saying that while they had "devastated" the speakers before him, when he took to the podium "they were all looking at me silently. It wasn't that I captured them. They were ready."

"Cuomo...manages in his oratory to achieve just the optimum temperature for both convention hall and living room. The impact of Cuomo's keynote address was much greater than either he or even the most sanguine of his advisers could have hoped for. The television ratings were extraordinary...It instantly turned Mario Cuomo into a truly national figure."

— Robert S. McElvaine, 1988

An estimated 79 million people saw the address on television. Cuomo received hundreds of letters of praise for his convention performance. James Reston wrote that it was "brilliant...with every word, gesture, expression and pause in harmony." In a July 21 analysis of the DNC, Dudley Clendinen of The New York Times wrote "Governor Cuomo's speech showed it was possible for a Democrat to combat President Reagan on television with philosophy and metaphor, that passion could be the party's engine and oratory its modern weapon." Murray Kempton of Newsday remarked that "For a little less time than it takes a subway from Far Rockaway to Manhattan, Mario Cuomo had taken all the broken promises and put them together shining and renewed, and he had restored the Democratic Party to virginity." Arkansas Governor Bill Clinton, expressing disappointment over the substance of the speech, asked Colorado Governor Dick Lamm, "C’mon, what did it really say about the issues we’re trying to raise?"

Conservative reception of the speech was much less positive. William Safire remarked that it was "the best-delivered keynote address since the days of Alben Barkley—devoid only of humor...[Cuomo] almost succeeded in giving compassion a good name." Robert Reno of Newsday labeled it "standard bleeding heart doctrine." Columnist George Will wrote that Cuomo deserved a "C for substance, A for delivery," adding, "Cuomo did what a keynote speaker is supposed to do...style being ten times more important than content on such occasions, he convinces the conventioneers that they are the children of light, destined to push back the darkness."

A spokesman for the Reagan presidential campaign stated that the speech was "a well-crafted litany of cheap shots and half-truths." Nevertheless, Reagan deemed Cuomo's rhetorical appeals to working-class voters to be of threatening strength and re-orientated his campaign to ensure their support. Reagan defeated Mondale in a landslide in the November election. Richard Greene opined that due to this fact and that many of the issues Cuomo highlighted were not subsequently addressed, the speech failed in its immediate goal.

== Legacy ==
According to Walter Shapiro, Cuomo's address "defined—for then and now—what it means to be a liberal." Michael Waldman said it was "as powerful a statement of core, traditional, liberal Democratic philosophy as you'll ever get." Representative Nancy Pelosi called it "one of the top ten speeches in history." Andrei Cherny wrote, "A hundred years from now, if there is one speech that people will study and remember from a Democratic politician in the last quarter of the 20th century, it will rightly be Cuomo's 1984 address. It is hard to overstate the impact it had on a generation of the party's speechwriters, strategists and policy thinkers." He opined that the address was wholly lacking in actionable promises and was too focused on the Democratic Party's past accomplishments. Likening it to William Jennings Bryan's 1896 Cross of Gold speech which, though well received, was not conscious of impending modernization and did not lead to political success, he concluded that "The lengthened shadow of Cuomo's address has contributed to inhibiting the growth of a new, unifying, positive appeal that puts progress back at the heart of progressivism." Michael A. Cohen wrote in 2015, "[D]on’t call it a great 'political' speech...what's often forgotten about Cuomo's speech is that in reflecting the core beliefs of the Democratic Party he was decidedly out of tune with the tenor of the times." He added, "[H]owever...there is an increasing sense that the two cities of which Cuomo spoke are the defining construct of American life, circa 2015. His unapologetic liberalism might have fallen flat politically in 1984, but it might be even more relevant today."

Jeff Shesol called the oration "Mario Cuomo's finest moment". Quinn said "[I]f Mondale had given that speech, no one would have ever remembered it." Cuomo died on January 1, 2015. Most of his obituaries mentioned the address. Hundreds of people subsequently shared YouTube video of it over social media.

Musician Wax Tailor sampled portions of the speech for his song "Misery," from his 2021 album The Shadow of Their Suns.
