= Cuomo (disambiguation) =

Cuomo may refer to:

- Cuomo, a surname of Italian origin
- Governor Cuomo (disambiguation), several governors named "Cuomo" (belonging to the Cuomo family)
- Cuomo family, a U.S. political family based in New York State
- The Cuomo Mag, a.k.a. "The Cuomo", a 3-D printed AR-15 gun ammunition clip magazine

== See also ==
- Cuomo Prime Time, a primetime TV news magazine on CNN
