= Governor Cuomo =

Governor Cuomo may refer to one of the following Governors of New York:

- Mario Cuomo (1932–2015), 52nd Governor (1983–1994)
- Andrew Cuomo (born 1957), 56th Governor (2011–2021); son of Mario Cuomo

== See also ==
- Cuomo, surname
- Cuomo (disambiguation)
