= Matilda's Law =

New York State law

New York State Governor
- Territorial extent: New York (state)
- Enacted by: New York State Governor
- Signed by: Andrew Cuomo
- Signed: March 20, 2020
- Effective: March 22, 2020
- Status: In force

Matilda's Law is an executive order in New York State that was issued on March 20, 2020 (effective March 22, 2020) to protect public health during the COVID-19 pandemic.

It directs vulnerable populations including those 70 years old and older, those with compromised immune systems, and those with underlying conditions to take specific precautions. These included limiting and screening visitors, and staying at home unless obtaining supplies, medical care, emergency services, or practicing solitary outdoor exercise.

The directive was named in honor of Matilda Cuomo, the former First Lady of New York state and mother of Governor Andrew Cuomo.
