= Inside with Chris Cuomo =

American documentary series

Inside with Chris Cuomo is an American documentary series hosted by Chris Cuomo. The series documents Chris in social issues in U.S. cities from an insider perspective. Announced in March 2017 under the working title Inside Secret Places with Chris Cuomo, the series' five-episode first season premiered on HLN on October 20, 2017.

== Episodes ==
No.	Title	Original release date	U.S. viewers
1	"SOS New Hampshire"	October 20, 2017	219,000
The effects of the Opioid epidemic in New Hampshire.
2	"The Talking Dead"	October 27, 2017	N/A
Dr. Corrine Stern, the chief medical examiner of Webb County, Texas, investigates migrants who die whilst trying to cross the Mexico-U.S. border in Laredo.
3	"Secret Lives, Secret Places"	November 3, 2017	N/A
Custody battles in the Fundamentalist Church of Jesus Christ of Latter-Day Saints.
4	"Anyone's Daughter"	November 10, 2017	N/A
Cuomo investigates child sex trafficking in Los Angeles.
5	"Green is the New Black"	November 17, 2017	N/A
Cuomo explores the Bedford Hills Correctional Facility for Women in New York, the state's only maximum security prison for women.
