= The Italian Language Foundation =

US non-profit organization

The Italian Language Foundation (ILF) was established on July 3, 2008, to promote and support Italian language education in the United States and specifically to reinstate the Advanced Placement program (AP) of the College Board for AP Italian Language and Culture.

The foundation was founded by Margaret I. Cuomo, M.D., currently the ILF's president, and Louis A. Tallarini, its chairman. Cuomo, working with her mother, Matilda Raffa Cuomo, former First Lady of the State of New York, had successfully advocated for the College Board to develop and implement the AP program in Italian Language and Culture, which was launched in 2005, but discontinued after the 2008–2009 academic year due to budgetary reasons.

The ILF has worked with major Italian-American non-profit groups and educators interested in Italian language and culture, such as the American Association of Teachers of Italian (AATI) and the American Council on the Teaching of Foreign Languages (ACTFL), as well as with the Republic of Italy, in order to raise awareness and funds in support of its mission. In addition to a pledge of $1,500,000 by the Republic of Italy, the Columbus Citizens Foundation, organizers of New York City's annual Columbus Day Parade, pledged over $500,000 in support of reinstatement of the AP Italian program.

On November 10, 2010, the College Board announced that the AP Italian program would be reinstated beginning in the fall of 2011, with the first AP Italian exam scheduled for May 2012.

== See also ==
- Advanced Placement Italian Language and Culture
