= AP Italian Language and Culture =

Advanced Placement course

Advanced Placement (AP) Italian Language and Culture (also known as AP Italian Language or AP Italian) is a course offered by the American College Board as part of the Advanced Placement Program. It is intended to give students a thorough background in the Italian language and Italian culture equivalent to a college-level course.

Due to low numbers of students taking AP Italian, it was temporarily discontinued after the 2008–2009 year. On July 3, 2008, The Italian Language Foundation was established to support Italian language education and the AP Italian program. On November 10, 2010, the College Board announced that the program would be reinstated in the fall of 2011, with the first AP Italian Exam scheduled for May 2012.

== Course content ==
The AP Italian Language and Culture course focuses on developing students' reading, writing, listening, and speaking skills, all framed in order to reflect the richness of Italian language and culture. Teachers of the course will interweave the language structure with cultural content.

== The examination ==
The examination tests students' abilities to successfully use three modes of communication: interpersonal, interpretive, and presentational. The five ultimate goals of the exam are communication, culture, connections, comparisons, and community.

== Grade distribution ==
Score	2007	2009	2012	2013	2014	2015	2016	2017	2018	2019	2020	2021	2022	2023	2024	2025	2026
5	15.3%	17.9%	22.6%	20.4%	20.7%	20.8%	22.4%	18.4%	18.5%	13.6%	18.5%	20.6%	22.6%	23.2%	20%	21%	19%
4	12.7%	14.1%	23.7%	20.9%	20.6%	20.1%	18.8%	19.1%	18.1%	18.1%	16.8%	22.6%	20.6%	22.8%	22%	24%	22%
3	23.9%	23.9%	28.1%	28.8%	28.3%	27.4%	30.9%	34.0%	32.0%	34.4%	40.1%	29.2%	27.3%	26.9%	29%	28%	28%
2	20.0%	20.3%	19.5%	22.9%	22.0%	22.7%	19.9%	22.4%	21.4%	24.6%	19.5%	18.6%	18.6%	17.1%	18%	19%	20%
1	28.0%	23.8%	6.1%	6.9%	8.4%	9.1%	8.1%	6.1%	10.0%	9.3%	5.1%	9.0%	10.8%	10.1%	11%	8%	55%
% of scores 3 or higher	52.0%	55.9%	74.4%	70.2%	69.6%	68.2%	72.1%	71.5%	68.6%	66.1%	75.4%	72.4%	70.5%	72.9%	71%	73%	69%
Mean	2.67	2.82	3.37	3.25	3.23	3.21	3.27	3.21	3.14	3.02	3.24	3.27	3.26	3.22	3.22		
Standard deviation	1.40	1.41	1.20	1.21	1.24	1.26	1.24	1.16	1.23	1.16	1.12	1.23	1.29	1.28	1.26		
Number of Students	1,642	2,282	1,806	1,980	2,331	2,573	2,774	2,571	2,926	2,658	2,518	2,102	2,194	2,034	2,246	2,241	2,500
