= Shelley Ross =

American TV executive producer

Shelley Ross is an American television executive producer, best known for her work on ABC News' Good Morning America and PrimeTime Live.

== Career ==
Ross began her career in network TV as segment producer for NBC's The Tomorrow Show in 1981. Three weeks into her first job, she booked and produced the first-ever interview with convicted mass cult murderer Charles Manson. It was a ratings success, attracting 22.2 million viewers instead of its usual 6.9.

Following her stint at NBC, Ross became a producer at ABC News, working primarily on PrimeTime Live. In 1990, she produced the Emmy Award-winning documentary "Murder in Beverly Hills" about the Menendez murders, hosted by Diane Sawyer. While she and Sawyer worked for over two decades, Ross also produced stories for Sam Donaldson, exposing Hollywood's manipulation of blockbuster profits and sexual harassment in the military. Their groundbreaking report on the Navy Tailhook convention revealed years of harassment and led to President George H. W. Bush demanding the Secretary of the Navy's resignation and new policies.

In 1994, Ross also produced the first TV interview with Paula Jones, the first woman to sue former President Bill Clinton for sexual harassment. ABC bosses challenged the newsworthiness of letting “just anyone” who wants to accuse the president of wrongdoing to go on camera. Ross’ booking letter was their best argument: “Dear Paula, If you want to be believed, don’t sit down with Katie, Connie, Leslie, Diane or Barbara. Sit in the hot seat across from the toughest interviewer in Washington, D.C., Sam Donaldson, and show you’re not afraid to answer any questions.”

In 1998, Good Morning America was experiencing a significant ratings decline, trailing behind The Today Show, which was drawing over 5 million viewers compared to GMA's 3 million. To reverse this trend, ABC appointed Ross as the executive producer by the end of the year.

In January 1999, a revamped Good Morning America debuted under Ross' leadership. Her first major move was to pair Charles Gibson with Diane Sawyer, along with making changes to the show's content and pacing. The adjustments quickly paid off, with ratings surging 34% compared to the previous year's fourth-quarter averages.

In 2005, she won a shared Gerald Loeb Award for Television Deadline. Ross was a producer of The Early Show.

In 2016, she accused her boss on the show, Roger Ailes, of sexual harassment shortly after she was hired in 1981; he allegedly insisted on having a "sexual alliance."

In September 2021, she accused her previous employee, Chris Cuomo, of sexually harassing her in 2005 during an employee's farewell party at a bar in Manhattan. Stopping short of asking him to be fired from CNN, she said she would "like to see him journalistically repent." Cuomo admitted to the incident and apologized in a statement: "As Shelley acknowledges, our interaction was not sexual in nature. It happened 16 years ago in a public setting when she was a top executive at ABC. I apologized to her then, and I meant it."
