= Charles Raffa =

Italian-American businessman (1904–1988)

Carmelo "Charles" Raffa (July 11, 1904 – October 19, 1988) was an Italian emigrant to New York City who became a successful businessman. He was the father of Matilda Cuomo, and the maternal grandfather of Andrew, Chris and Margaret Cuomo.

== Early life ==
Although his birthplace is often reported as Messina, Italy, Raffa was born in the United States in 1904. As a kid, he followed his family back to Messina, and only returned to the United States in 1927.

== Career ==
Raffa initially worked as a laborer when he immigrated from Italy. He later founded his own business Ideal Fixture Company, which became highly successful building supermarket shelves and refrigeration units. According to Lori Zabar, he was "known for providing ... affordable payment terms." Zabar reports that Raffa recommended to Louis Zabar the original location for his eponymous grocery store Zabar's.

He used the proceeds from this company to invest in real estate, buying up dozens of residential and commercial properties in New York.

== Personal life ==
He was married to Mary Gitto, and had five children: Frank, Matilda, Sam, Joseph and Nancy. He maintained homes in East Flatbush, New York and New Jersey.

== Death ==
In 1984, Raffa was assaulted in an abandoned grocery store he owned. He was badly beaten and later received plastic surgery. Despite medical intervention, he never fully recovered and used a wheelchair for the remainder of his life. He succumbed to his illness at the Jewish Center for Geriatric Care in New Hyde Park, Long Island in 1988. Following his death, his descendants feuded over who should receive shares of his estate, valued at between $5 million and $13 million.
