= Muckety =

2007 website

Muckety, launched in 2007, used interactive maps to show relationships between people, businesses and organizations. The site also published news stories about influential people and their connections to government, business and one another. Muckety ceased operations in 2017 without explanation

Muckety won the award for "Outstanding Use of Digital Technologies, Small Site" at 2009 Online Journalism Awards presented by the Online News Association.
