= Margaret Cuomo =

American radiologist (born 1955)

- Born: March 29, 1955 (age 71); New York City, U.S.
- Education: St. John's University (BS); SUNY Downstate Medical Center (MD)
- Occupations: Physician; radiologist
- Spouses: Peter Perpignano (m. 1982; div. 19??); Howard Simon Maier (m. 1994)
- Children: 2
- Parents: Mario Cuomo; Matilda Raffa
- Relatives: Cuomo family

Margaret I. Cuomo (born March 29, 1955) is an American radiologist and author on health issues, especially those related to cancer prevention. She is the oldest child of former New York Governor Mario Cuomo and Matilda Cuomo, and sister to former New York Governor Andrew Cuomo and journalist Chris Cuomo. She resides in New York.

== Early life and education ==
Cuomo was born in New York City to former New York Governor Mario Cuomo and former New York First Lady Matilda Cuomo. She grew up in Albany and Holliswood, Queens, New York with her four siblings, Andrew, Maria, Madeline, and Chris.

She attended High School in Jamaica Estates and graduated from The Mary Louis Academy in the class of 1973. She graduated from St. John's University and received an M.D. degree from the SUNY Downstate Medical Center in Brooklyn, New York, in 1981.

== Professional career ==
Cuomo is a board-certified radiologist who practiced at North Shore University Hospital in Manhasset, New York. She has specialized in body imaging, involving CT, ultrasound, MRI, and interventional procedures, much of her practice was dedicated to the diagnosis of cancer and AIDS.

Cuomo gave the commencement speech at Dowling College on May 18, 2013, where she was also awarded an honorary Doctor of Science degree.

== Authorships ==
Cuomo's book, A World Without Cancer: The Making of a New World and the Real Promise of Prevention, was published in October 2012 by Rodale.

Cuomo contributes blog posts focusing on cancer prevention, the economic impact of cancer, and the need for reform. She also contributes to WebMD. Cuomo has a Muckety score of 60.

== Philanthropy ==
In addition to her cancer prevention-related work, Cuomo has supported multiple initiatives to support Italian language education in the United States. She is the founder of The Italian Language Foundation.

== Honors ==
Cuomo is an honoree of the Association of Italian American Educators (2003, 2005) and the National Organization of Italian American Women (2004). In 2011, Cuomo was awarded the "Commendatore dell’Ordine della Stella della Solidarietà Italiana," the "Order of the Star of Italian Solidarity," by Giorgio Napolitano, president of Italy.

== Memberships ==
Cuomo is a member of the Medical Review Board of Huffington Post. She is also a member of the Princeton University Advisory Council, French & Italian. In 2007, she was listed as a member of the National Advisory Board of Concordia Language Villages. Cuomo was a member of the board of LessCancer.org 2013–2016.

== Personal life ==
Cuomo married Peter Perpignano on October 10, 1982. The couple later divorced. They have one daughter, Christina Cuomo Perpignano.

On February 20, 1994, Cuomo married Howard Simon Maier. The couple has one daughter, Marianna Cuomo Maier.

== See also ==
- The Italian Language Foundation
