= Luigi Cuomo =

Italian fencer (1901–1993)

Personal information
- Born: 18 February 1901
- Died: 22 June 1993 (aged 92)

Sport
- Sport: Fencing

Luigi Cuomo (18 February 1901 – 22 June 1993) was an Italian fencer. He competed in the team foil competition at the 1924 Summer Olympics.
