= David W. Burke =

American business executive (1936–2014)

David Warren Burke (April 3, 1936 – April 18, 2014) was an American news executive and political administrator. He was Vice President ABC News, where he worked with Peter Jennings and Barbara Walters, among others. President of CBS News (1988–90)

Born on April 3, 1936 in Brookline, Massachusetts. Burke was the son of a police officer and grandson of a firefighter. He graduated from Tufts University with a degree in economics. Following Tufts University he began working at Lever Brothers factory mixing soap and loading freight cars. After a year the plant was closed and Burke moved on to the University of Chicago Booth School of Business, where he earned his MBA, he worked for United States Senator Edward M. Kennedy (D-MA) as well as for New York Governor Hugh Carey (D-NY), as secretary. One of his college professors, George P. Shultz, helped him get a job at the White House under President John F. Kennedy as executive secretary of the Advisory Committee on Labor-Management Policy. In 1965, Burke joined Senator Kennedy's staff as a legislative assistant. Within three weeks he was shepherding legislation to abolish the poll tax and liberalize immigration. The next year, he became administrative assistant, the top job in a Senate office.

In 1995, Burke was appointed by then President Bill Clinton to the Broadcasting Board of Governors as its first chairman. The David Burke Distinguished Journalism Award is named after him. The award recognizes courage, integrity, and professionalism of journalists who work for media networks under the U.S. Agency for Global Media. Burke left the board in 1998.

== Death ==
Burke died at a hospital in Medford, Massachusetts on April 18, 2014, aged 78. He had vascular dementia. He was survived by his wife of more than a half century, Beatrice C. "Trixie" (née Pollock) Burke, their five children, his sister Constance, and a large extended family.
