= Salvatore Cuomo =

Italian restaurateur (born 1972)

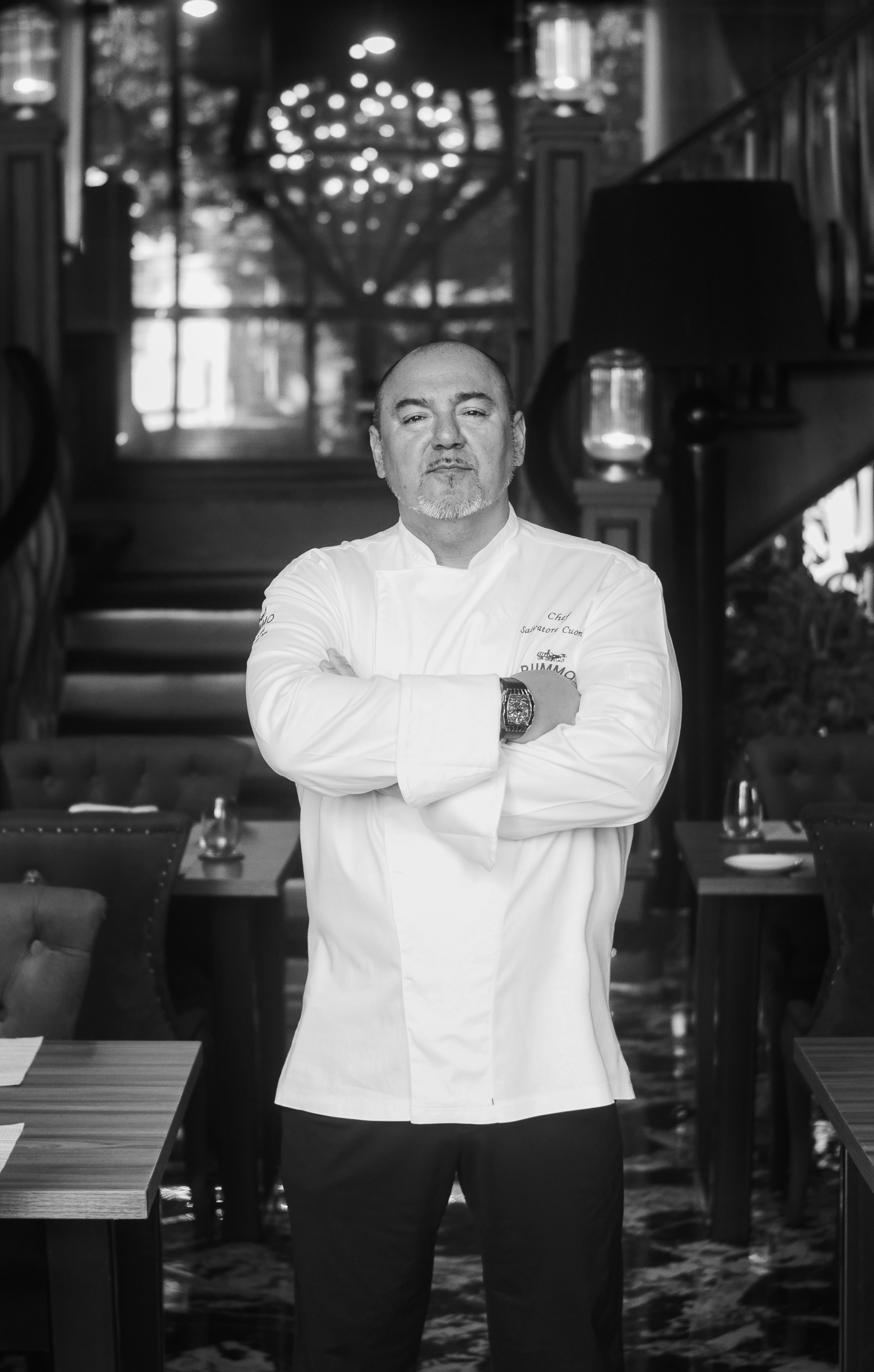
- Born: 14 July 1972 (age 54); Naples, Italy
- Other name: Salvatore Shigeta
- Education: Culinary School
- Occupations: Chef; Founder and CEO of Salvatore Cuomo International Ltd. Hong Kong; Chairman of Salvatore Cuomo International Japan; Chairman of LAB3680 Japan
- Years active: 1984–present
- Television: Japanese and international television
- Spouse: Pia Schallenberger (m. 2014)
- Children: 10
- Website: www.salvatorecuomo.net

Signature
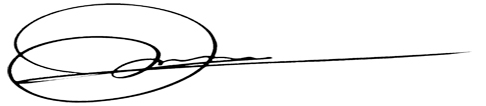

Salvatore Cuomo Career
- Culinary career
- Cooking style: Italian cuisine (pizzaiolo), fresh and organic
- Ratings
- Yahoo Travel; Trip Advisor; Australia; Trip Advisor; France; Trip Advisor; Japan; Trip Advisor; Tableog; Time Out; Restaurant Iku
- Current restaurants
- Over 100 Restaurants Casa Cuomo by Salvatore Cuomo Expo Osaka Open April 2025 Casa Cuomo Pizzeria BLOSSOM Hibiya Open March 2025 Casa Cuomo Cafe Ukiha Open December 2024 Casa Cuomo Cafe Oyama Open February 2024 Casa Cuomo Jakarta Open 2023 Gelateria LAB3680 Hita Open 2022 Salvatore Cuomo Cafe Manila Open 2020 77 Pizza Salvatore Cuomo (chain); Salvatore Cuomo Restaurant (chain); Salvatore Cuomo & Bar (chain); Salvatore Cuomo Grill (chain); Mohri Salvatore; Presto Salvatore Cuomo (chain); 6 The Kitchen Salvatore Cuomo (Tokyo, Nagoya, Kyoto, Seoul, Shanghai); 5 XEX; AG (teppanyaki restaurant) Other restaurants The Bar (chain); Italian Ichiban & Bar Salvatore; Cristal Jade; Paul Bassett; Les Chocolat De H Soba & Bar An Yakiniku An
- Television show
- Over 100 Asian television show appearances

Salvatore Shigeta (né Cuomo; born 14 July 1972) is an Italian-born Japanese chef, restaurateur and media personality, known for his food-focused television shows and cookbooks, and his restaurants across Asia.

He is known in Japan as "The Pizza Man" and "The Grand Chef". He owns and operates Ystable Corporation, owned together with Seizaburo Kanayama.

== Early life ==
Salvatore Cuomo was born in Naples, Italy, in 1972, the son of an Italian father and Japanese mother.

Cuomo was first inspired by his father who also was an Italian Chef in Naples. He began at the young age of 11, where he trained himself in the kitchen and traveled frequently between Italy and Japan. He gradually learned how to blend the traditional Italian art of cooking with the Japanese art of perfection.

A few years later he travelled to Japan with his father who opened an Italian restaurant in Chiba in 1984. About those early years Salvatore told the press that it wasn't a good starting experience: "I didn’t like Japan at all, so after one year, I went back to Italy and spent 2–3 years studying at a culinary school. When I was 18, I returned to Japan after my father became terminally ill and I have been here ever since." Cuomo said that Italian Cuisine was just starting to get popular in those days. He and his two brothers decided that in order to succeed in the restaurant business in Japan they would have to understand the Japanese food mentality. They spent a couple of years researching the market before opening a new restaurant in Tokyo with what Cuomo calls "Original Neapolitan pizza."

According to Chris Betros, writing for Japan Today, Cuomo "has been credited with catapulting Neapolitan pizza to fame in Japan".

== Career ==
His first job was as a pizzaiolo in Naples, where he first gained experience with preparing pizzas and Italian dishes, and developed a relationship with his mentor, his father.

According to Chris Betros, writing for Japan Today, Cuomo "has been credited with catapulting Neapolitan pizza to fame in Japan".

He operates more than 70 Pizza Salvatore restaurants, multiple The Kitchen Salvatore Cuomo restaurants (in Kyoto, Nagoya and Shanghai, Seoul Korea), as well as Salvatore Cuomo Bros (under the umbrella of XEX), BOTTEGA casual dining, Café al Grazie, and Italiaichiba Bar establishments.

Cuomo has made numerous guest appearances on TV programs such as Iron Chef and Buona Sera, an Italian cooking program on WOWOW.

He has written three books: Welcome to Neapolitan Dining Table (1995), Happy Pasta (1997), Sun’s Dining Table (1999), One Life (2010), #PIZZAUNESCO 2016 (2016), #PIZZAUNESCO 2017 (2017).

In 2010, the Yucasee Newspaper reported Salvatore Cuomo collaborating with 辻口博啓氏 Tsujikuchi Hiroshi Akira, Japanese chef patissier-chocolatier. In March 2014, ANA (All Nippon Airways) joins Salvatore Cuomo Chef Cuomo said numerous times to be very careful that all his outside activities do not take him out of the kitchen for too long. "It's very important to stay in my chef's uniform. I may be a CEO but the kitchen is my second home. You can only understand the feelings of your customers by being there, not just by asking staff."

In December 2013, Tsujikuchi Hiroshi chef at Le Chocolat de H (Japan), owned by Salvatore Cuomo, wins the highest award for a Pastry Chef at the Salon Du Chocolat, International Pastry Competition held in Paris.

In February 2014, Salvatore Cuomo opened his first restaurant in Taiwan. TVBS reported that the chef's move would help the country with an injection of $70 million in the economy.

Paul Huaug, pizzaiolo working for Chef Cuomo won the Caputo Cup (Taipei) in May 2014. Paul Huang is the first officially recognised Taiwanese pizzaiolo by the Italian Neapolitan Pizzaiolo Association). Always the same month Salvatore Cuomo appears on Vogue Taiwan and Taiwanese Television storm the restaurant for the weeks after the competition as first Taiwanese Pizza Maker wins an international competition for the first time in the history of the country.

In June 2014, Taiwanese magazine Bazar named Cuomo the best thing that landed in Taiwan in 2014.

== TV and media ==
Salvatore started doing TV in Japan, hosting a TV cooking program on major television and smaller channels.

His restaurant openings continued to receive coverage from Japanese media.

In June 2010, Chinese Magazine Sina Fashion called Salvatore "a gift from Naples" after the success of the first VPN Accredited Neapolitan Restaurant in mainland China.

In February 2013 South Korean editor Ju Younguk describes the moment Pizza first arrived in the country in 1985 as if history repeated itself with the first Salvatore Cuomo Restaurant opening in Korea. The food critic talks about Salvatore visiting local artisans in order to reproduce the authentic wood oven to bake pizza in Korea too, titleing him "a treat Precious in taste"

In 2013 XEX Tokyo Restaurant owned by Salvatore Cuomo was described by Anthony Bourdain during his show Anthony Bourdain: No Reservations Tokyo, on the Travel Channel as the final destination for the Japanese elite. In 2019 Arirang TV Documentary about Chef Salvatore Cuomo In Busan Korea Travel Channel.

== Awards and honours ==
In June 2004 awarded by the ICF Worldwide Italian Cuisine Ambassador. A proponent of fresh italian cuisine, Cuomo was named the most influential Italian person in Japan.

In 2006, 2007 and 2008, Chef Cuomo placed in the first 3 positions at the International Pizza Festival held in Naples World Pizza Championship.

In 2009, he was honored Chevallier by the ORDRE DES COTEAUX DE CHAMPAGNE in recognition to his economic help to the wine industry and expansion of Italian and French products in Asia.

In 2010, he was named World Wide 1st. Ambassador of Mozzarella Bufala Campana.

In 2013 was awarded Parma Ham Specialist by the Parma Ham Prosciutto for his high quality restaurants where Parma Ham is used and his contribution to the industry.

In 2016 GUINNESS World Record for the longest Pizza in the world, 1855,88 meters (Leader Asia Pacific Section)

In 2017 UNESCO Committee Member of the Neapolitan Pizza Association: Listing of the Art of Neapolitan Pizza Making on UNESCO'S Intangible Cultural

2020-2025 San Pellegrino-Acqua Panna Brand Ambassador in Japan

=== Other ===
- 2022-2025 Albergo Diffuso World Ambassador
- 2024-2025 Casa Cuomo by Salvatore Cuomo Ranked n.27 Best Italian Restaurant in The World Top 50 ITALY
- 2023-2024 Casa Cuomo by Salvatore Cuomo Ranked n.29 Best Italian Restaurant in The World Top 50 ITALY
- 2022-2025 Pasta Rummo Brand Ambassador
- 2020-2025 San Pellegrino-Acqua Panna Brand Ambassador in Japan
- 2017 UNESCO'S Committee Member of the Neapolitan Pizza Association: Listing of the Art of Neapolitan Pizza Making on UNESCO'S Intangible Cultural Heritage Loist in Cheju Iland Korea
- 2016 Asia Team Leader - Longest Pizza in the World in Naples, Italy, Guinness World Records 2014 Parma Ham Specialist
- 2013 APN Ambassador in Asia
  2012 Ordre des Coteaux de Champagne (Officier)
  2010 Shanghai EXPO EXECUTIVE CHEF Casa Italia
- 2009 Verace Pizza Napoletana Ambassador in the world. Pizza World Championship 3rd Classified PIZZA FEST NAPLES
- 2008 Pizza World Championship 2nd. Classified PIZZA FEST NAPLES
- 2007 Pizza World Championship 1st. Classified PIZZA FEST NAPLES

== Books ==
- Welcome to Neapolitan Dining Table (1995) (in Japanese)
- Happy Pasta (1997) – Japanese Only (in Japanese)
- Sun’s Dining Table (1999) (in Japanese)
- One Life (2010) (in Japanese)
- #PizzaUnesco (2016-2017) (in Italian)
