= Michael A. Cohen =

American academic in international affairs

Michael A. Cohen is an American academic who is the director of the International Affairs Program at The New School. He also works as Advisor to the Dean of the Faculty of Architecture, Design, and Urban Planning of the University of Buenos Aires.

== Education ==
Cohen received his Ph.D. in 1971 in Political Economy from the University of Chicago.

== Career ==
From 1972 to 1999, Cohen worked at the World Bank. He was responsible for much of the urban policy development of the Bank over that period and, from 1994-1998, he served as the Senior Advisor to the Bank's Vice-President for Environmentally Sustainable Development. Cohen has worked in over fifty countries and was heavily involved in the Bank's work on infrastructure, environment, and sustainable development.

Before coming to the New School in 2001, Cohen was a Visiting Fellow of the International Center for Advanced Studies at New York University.

Cohen is a member of the U.S. National Academy of Sciences Panel on Urban Dynamics, and is currently completing a study of urban inequality in Buenos Aires. He has taught at the University of California at Berkeley, The Johns Hopkins University, and the School of Architecture, Design, and Urban Planning of the University of Buenos Aires.

== Works ==
Cohen is the author or editor of several books, including most recently Preparing the Urban Future: Global Pressures and Local Forces (ed. with A. Garland, B. Ruble, and J. Tulchin), The Human Face of the Urban Environment (ed. with I. Serageldin), and Urban Policy and Economic Development: An Agenda for the 1990s. Other recent publications include articles in 25 Years of Urban Development (Amersfoort, The Netherlands, 1998), Cities Fit for People (Kirdar, ed., 1996), The Brookings Review, Journal of the Society for the Study of Traditional Environments, International Social Science Review, Habitat International, and Finance and Development.
