= Cuomo family =

American political family

Cuomo
- Political family
- Current region: New York, U.S.
- Origin: Salerno and Messina, Italy
- Titles: List: United States Secretary of Housing and Urban Development; Governor of New York (52 & 56); First Lady of New York; Lieutenant Governor of New York; Second Lady of New York; Attorney General of New York; Secretary of State of New York; Assistant Secretary of Housing and Urban Development for Community Planning and Development; Chair of the National Governors Association; Vice Chair of the National Governors Association
- Connected families: Kennedy family

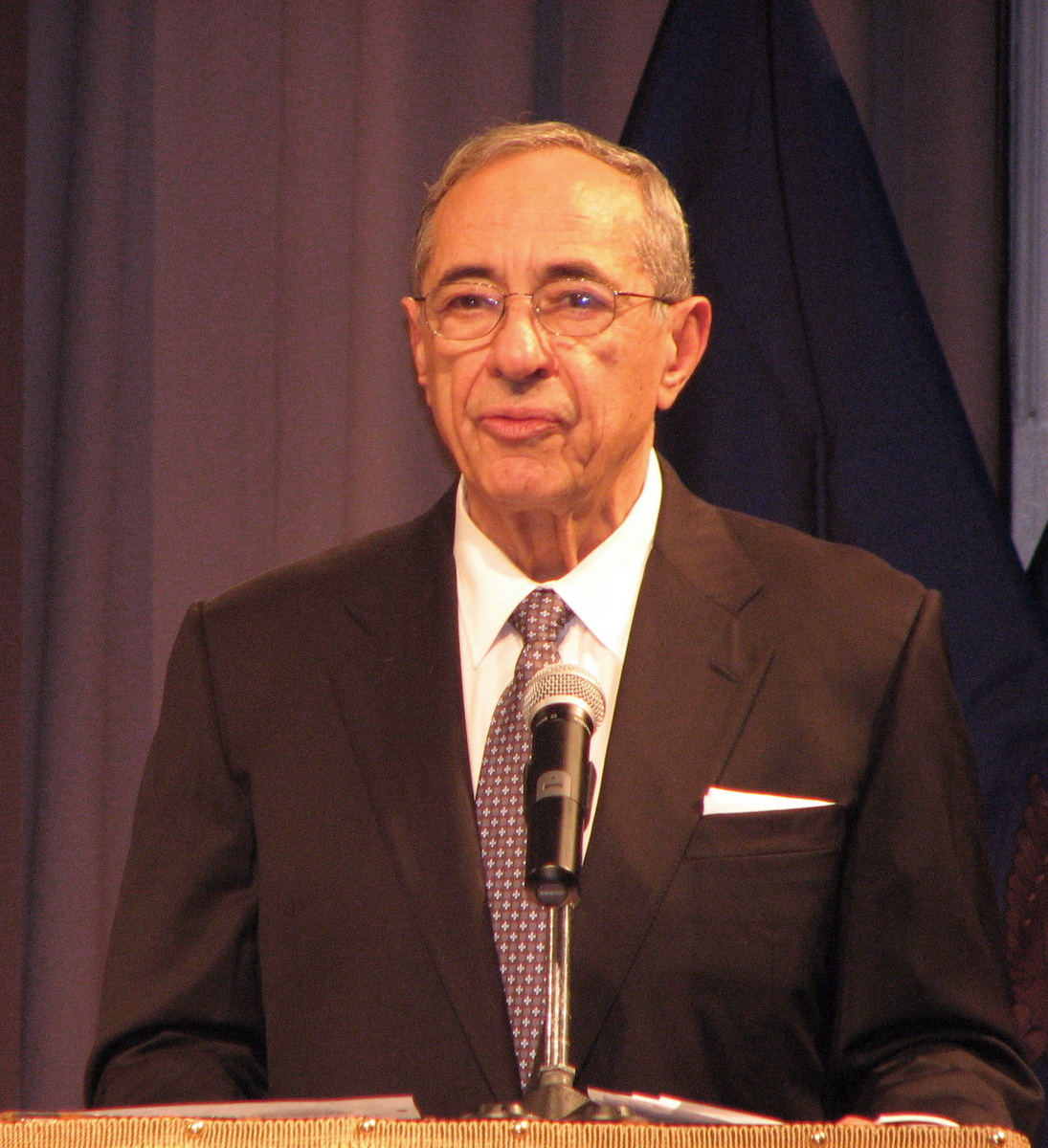
Mario Cuomo giving a speech in 2007

The Cuomo family (/ˈkwoʊmoʊ/ KWOH-moh, Italian: [ˈkwɔːmo]) is an American political family. It includes Mario Cuomo and Matilda Cuomo (née Raffa) and their five children: Margaret, Andrew, Maria, Madeline, and Christopher. Mario Cuomo and his son Andrew Cuomo both have served as governor of New York.

Mario Cuomo's parents, Andrea and Immacolata Cuomo, immigrated to the United States from Nocera Superiore and Tramonti, both in Campania, Italy; Andrea in 1926 and Immacolata in 1927. Matilda Raffa Cuomo's parents both immigrated to the United States from the area of Messina, in Sicily; Carmelo "Charles" Raffa arrived in New York in 1927, and Mary Raffa (née Gitto) in 1928.

- Mario Cuomo (June 15, 1932 – January 1, 2015), unsuccessful candidate for Lieutenant Governor of New York (1974); appointed New York Secretary of State by Governor Hugh Carey (1975–1978); unsuccessful candidate in 1977 Democratic primary for mayor of New York City (lost to Ed Koch); unsuccessful Liberal Party of New York candidate in general election for mayor of New York City (1977), again losing to Ed Koch; Lieutenant Governor of New York 1979–1982; Governor of New York (1983–1994); keynote speaker at the 1984 Democratic National Convention in San Francisco.
- Matilda Cuomo (born September 16, 1931), First Lady of New York (1983–1994); educator, proponent of New York State Mentoring Program, founder of Mentoring USA nonprofit organization, inducted into National Women's Hall of Fame in 2017. Daughter of Charles Raffa.
- Margaret Cuomo (born March 29, 1955) daughter of Matilda and Mario Cuomo, is a physician and radiologist; author and advocate of cancer prevention; co-founder of the Italian Language Foundation.
- Andrew Cuomo (born December 6, 1957), son of Mario and Matilda Cuomo; United States Secretary of Housing and Urban Development (1997–2001); New York State Attorney General (2007–2010); governor of New York (2011–2021). From 1990 to 2003, Andrew Cuomo was married to Kerry Kennedy, daughter of Robert F. Kennedy and Ethel Skakel. After Cuomo and Kennedy divorced, Cuomo dated Food Network host Sandra Lee from 2005 until September 2019. Andrew resigned as governor on August 24, 2021, in response to sexual harassment allegations. Unsuccessful independent candidate in 2025 election for mayor of New York City, having lost the Democratic primary and the general election to Zohran Mamdani.
- Maria Cuomo Cole (born 1960), daughter of Matilda and Mario Cuomo, producer of social impact films at Cuomo Cole Productions, chairwoman of the charitable foundation Help USA, married to Kenneth Cole, a New York fashion designer.
- Madeline Cuomo (born 1964), daughter of Matilda and Mario Cuomo, attorney, specializing in matrimonial law, graduate of Albany Law School.
- Christopher Cuomo (born August 9, 1970), son of Mario Cuomo and Matilda Cuomo; anchor and host of Cuomo on NewsNation; former CNN anchor; former host of Cuomo Prime Time evening news program; former ABC News chief law and justice correspondent; former news anchor for Good Morning America; co-anchor for ABC's 20/20; winner of six national Emmys. On December 4, 2021, Chris was fired from CNN due to violations of journalism ethics and standards involving his brother Andrew's political position in addition to allegations of sexual misconduct.
