= Chris Cuomo =

American news broadcaster (born 1970)

- Cuomo in 2016
- Born: Christopher Charles Cuomo; August 9, 1970 (age 56); New York City, U.S.
- Education: Yale University (BA); Fordham University (JD)
- Occupation: News broadcaster
- Employer(s): NewsNation (2022–present); CNN (2013–2021); ABC News (1999–2013)
- Known for: Cuomo Prime Time; New Day
- Spouse: Cristina Greeven (m. 2001)
- Children: 3
- Parents: Mario Cuomo (father); Matilda Raffa (mother)
- Relatives: Cuomo family

Christopher Charles Cuomo (/ˈkwoʊmoʊ/ KWOH-moh; born August 9, 1970) is an American news broadcaster and journalist for NewsNation. He previously worked as the ABC News chief law and justice correspondent and the co-anchor for ABC's 20/20, news anchor for Good Morning America from 2006 to 2009, and an anchor at CNN, where he co-hosted its morning show New Day from 2013 through May 2018, before moving to Cuomo Prime Time in June 2018.

Cuomo is the brother of Andrew Cuomo, who was the 56th governor of New York from 2011 to 2021, and the son of Mario Cuomo, who was the 52nd governor of New York from 1983 until 1994. In December 2021, Chris Cuomo was fired by CNN after reports alleged that he helped his brother defend himself against the sexual harassment allegations that led him to resign his gubernatorial post. Cuomo subsequently joined Nexstar Media Group, hosting Cuomo for NewsNation.

== Early life and education ==
Cuomo was born in the New York City borough of Queens. He is the youngest child of Mario Cuomo, the former governor of New York, and Matilda Cuomo (née Raffa), and the brother of Andrew Cuomo, a former governor of New York. His parents were both of Italian descent; his paternal grandparents were from Nocera Inferiore and Tramonti in the Campania region of southern Italy, while his maternal grandparents were from Sicily (his grandfather from Messina).

Cuomo was educated at Immaculate Conception School in Jamaica, Queens; and then at The Albany Academy, a private university preparatory day school in Albany, New York, followed by Yale University, where he earned an undergraduate degree, and the Fordham University School of Law, where he earned his Juris Doctor in 1995. He is a licensed attorney.

== Career ==
Cuomo's early career in journalism included appearances related to social and political issues on CNBC, MSNBC, and CNN. He was a correspondent and political policy analyst for Fox News and Fox Broadcast Network's Fox Files, where he covered a wide range of stories focusing on controversial social issues. When asked if he should be considered a journalist on his show, Cuomo said, "I don't know how that's relevant. I don't care what they classify me as. I'm not forwarding my agenda. That's not my thing. My opinion is irrelevant." When hired for Fox Files Roger Ailes, the Fox News chairman, called Cuomo "fearless".

At ABC and as co-anchor of 20/20, his year-long coverage of heroin addiction revealed the extent to which it was affecting suburban families. His other work has included coverage of the Haiti earthquake, child custody, bullying, and homeless teens. Policy changes followed his undercover look at for-profit school recruiters, including an industry-wide cleanup. Cuomo's tip from a BMW owner led to a recall of over 150,000 affected vehicles.

From September 2006 to December 2009, he was the news anchor for Good Morning America. He was the primary reporter on breaking news stories, both in the U.S. and around the world, including dozens of assignments in some ten countries. He covered the war on terrorism, embedded on multiple occasions in Pakistan, Afghanistan, and Iraq (where his convoy was hit by an IED). In the U.S., he covered the Virginia Tech shooting, the 2009 Fort Hood shooting, and the Pennsylvania Amish school shootings. He did live broadcasts of Hurricanes Katrina and Rita, the Sago Mine collapse, and the Minneapolis bridge collapse in August 2007. He anchored morning and evening coverage.

During his period at ABC, he had a website, "Cuomo on the Case," as well as two weekly digital programs: The Real Deal and Focus on Faith. He also appeared with Father Edward Beck on ABC News Now, the network's 24-hour digital outlet.

=== Move to CNN ===
In February 2013, Cuomo moved to CNN to co-host its morning show. He made his debut on CNN as field anchor on the February 8, 2013, episode of Piers Morgan Tonight, covering the February 2013 North American blizzard. In March 2018, while serving as the co-anchor of CNN's morning show New Day, CNN announced that Cuomo would move to prime time to host Cuomo Prime Time.

In October 2017, sister network HLN premiered a new documentary series hosted by the anchor, Inside with Chris Cuomo, which focused on "stories affecting real people, in real towns and cities across America." In September 2018, he began hosting a two-hour weekday radio show "Let's Get After It" on the P.O.T.U.S. channel on SiriusXM.

==== "Fredo" incident ====
On August 13, 2019, in Shelter Island, New York, Cuomo threatened to throw a heckler down a flight of stairs at a bar and chastised him with profanity-laced insults after the man called him Fredo, in reference to the unglamorous fictional character from The Godfather novel and films. Cuomo told the man that the use of the name "Fredo" was equivalent to "the n-word" for Italian-Americans, which caused debate on Twitter about the assertion. Cuomo addressed the incident publicly, tweeting his appreciation to his supporters but acknowledging that he "should be better than what [he] oppose[s]."

==== Andrew Cuomo coverage and suspension from CNN ====
While recovering from COVID-19 in early 2020, Chris Cuomo interviewed his brother, New York Governor Andrew Cuomo, on his CNN program. After reports about sexual harassment allegations against his brother surfaced, Cuomo said on his program in March 2021 that he could not cover any issues regarding the allegations on the program, acknowledging his obvious conflict of interest.

In May 2021, Cuomo was reported to have participated in strategic discussions to advise his brother on how to respond to the allegations. CNN called Cuomo's engagement in the conversations "inappropriate" but said that it would not take any disciplinary action against him. Multiple CNN staffers said they were "vexed" by Cuomo's conduct and the violation of journalism ethics and standards. Cuomo subsequently issued an apology and stated that advising his brother was a "mistake" that would "never happen again". In August, Cuomo addressed his brother's impending resignation, reiterating he was not an adviser to Andrew and noting he had persuaded his brother to step down as governor.

On November 29, 2021, the New York attorney general's office released documents that show Cuomo used his media sources to uncover information about his brother's known accusers and inquire about the possibility of new accusers who had yet to come forward publicly. The documents also show that Cuomo helped formulate statements for Andrew and that Cuomo was actively in touch with a top aide to Andrew about future reports about Andrew's alleged misconduct. The following day, Cuomo was suspended indefinitely from CNN. Cuomo called his suspension "embarrassing" but said he understood "why some people feel the way they do about what I did". Following his suspension, several conservative commentators defended Cuomo. These supporters include Sean Hannity, Tucker Carlson, and Greg Gutfeld.

On December 4, after an internal review conducted by a law firm, CNN terminated Cuomo's employment and said they would investigate Cuomo's "involvement with his brother's defense". Cuomo stated he never tried to influence his own network's coverage of his brother's sexual allegation problems. In February 2022, Cuomo mentioned in a recorded interview that he "was going to kill everybody including myself" after his firing.

==== Sexual misconduct allegations ====
In September 1, 2020, on an episode of Tucker Carlson Tonight, Tucker Carlson played audio recording between Cuomo and former Trump lawyer Michael Cohen. In the interview, Cuomo stated that ABC reporters had contacted him regarding allegations that he had engaged in sexual harassment. In the recording, Cuomo tells Cohen that the allegations are false.

In September 2021, Cuomo's former boss, Shelley Ross, accused him of sexual harassment in a New York Times op-ed. Stopping short of asking him to be fired from CNN, she said she would "like to see him journalistically repent". Cuomo admitted to the incident, describing it as "not sexual in nature". He said he "apologized to her then, and I meant it".

In December 2021, Debra Katz, the attorney for another former colleague of Cuomo's, informed CNN that her client had accused Cuomo of sexual misconduct. The woman stated that after she rejected Cuomo's sexual advances, he assaulted her. Katz has since claimed that this accusation precipitated Cuomo's termination.

In January 2024, CNN contributor Angela Rye alleged that in response to a bikini picture she posted on Instagram, Cuomo privately sent her a screenshot of the post with the comment, “Happy New Year, tinsel crotch".

==== Termination fallout ====
On December 6, 2021, Cuomo announced he would be leaving his program on SiriusXM. On the same day, it was reported that Cuomo threatened to file a lawsuit against CNN to recover the $18 million of his remaining contract because network president Jeff Zucker understood the details of Cuomo's involvement with his brother's defense. Zucker has denied this was the case, and subsequently claimed in a virtual meeting with employees that he had reprimanded Cuomo in May, and that "Chris had gone further than he had told me and told other members of our senior executive team". On December 7, 2021, HarperCollins announced they would not be going forward in publishing Cuomo's book, originally titled Deep Denial in the fall of 2022. The book was to be an analysis of the COVID-19 pandemic and the first presidency of Donald Trump. On March 16, 2022, Cuomo filed a demand for arbitration claiming $125 million in damages against Turner Services and CNN America. The filing claimed Cuomo's "journalistic integrity" was "unjustifiably smeared", making the chance to find similar work impossible. He was looking to recover his remaining salary and future wages forfeited for his reputation being damaged.

=== NewsNation ===
On July 26, 2022, during an interview with Dan Abrams on NewsNation, Cuomo announced that he would be hosting a new primetime program on the Nexstar Media Group-owned channel later that year.

The new series, Cuomo, premiered on October 3, 2022. During the premiere, Cuomo stated that he had "learned lessons good and bad" since his firing from CNN. He added that his new show would not be "typical", and would (like the remainder of NewsNation's programming) aim to be neutral and nonpartisan in its commentary and content. Cuomo argued that "extremes are not America's majority", and that "In politics what you ignore you often empower. And the right has made a mistake in its silence for too long. Our election was not stolen. Your Republican leaders know this." In his first month with NewsNation, Cuomo interviewed Kanye West, clashing with him over his recent antisemitic comments.

At the end of 2025, NewsNation noted that Cuomo was the network's "highest-rated show."

=== Podcast ===
Cuomo began a podcast, The Chris Cuomo Project, on July 21, 2022.

== Awards ==
Cuomo has received multiple Emmy Award nominations. His Good Morning America profile of the 12-year-old poet Mattie Stepanek was recognized with a News Emmy, making him one of the youngest correspondents to receive the award.

He has been awarded Polk and Peabody Awards for team coverage. His work has been recognized in the areas of breaking news, business news, and legal news, with the Edward R. Murrow Award for breaking news coverage, the 2005 Gerald Loeb Award for Television Deadline business reporting for "Money for Nothing?", and the American Bar Association Silver Gavel Award for investigating juvenile justice.

== Personal life ==
In 2001, Cuomo married Gotham magazine editor Cristina Greeven in a Roman Catholic ceremony in Southampton, New York. They reside in Manhattan with their three children. Cuomo also owns a home in Southampton.

During the COVID-19 pandemic, Cuomo announced on March 31, 2020, that he had been diagnosed with COVID-19. During his quarantine, he broadcast his usual weekday program from his home. Cuomo later said he had a hallucination of his late father, former New York Governor Mario Cuomo, as a result of symptoms from the virus. In 2024, Cuomo stated he has had long COVID since his infection in 2020.

== See also ==
- Cuomo family
- New Yorkers in journalism
