= Matilda Cuomo =

Former First Lady of New York State (born 1931)

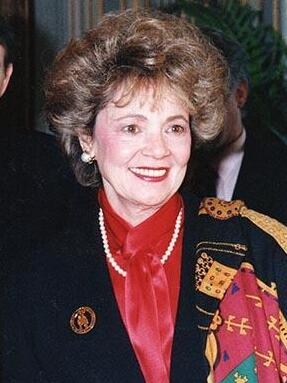
- Cuomo in 1992

First Lady of New York
- In role January 1, 1983 – December 31, 1994
- Governor: Mario Cuomo
- Preceded by: Evangeline Gouletas
- Succeeded by: Libby Pataki

Second Lady of New York
- In role January 1, 1979 – December 31, 1982
- Lieutenant Governor: Mario Cuomo
- Preceded by: Katherine Wilson Carey
- Succeeded by: Mary Anne Krupsak

Personal details
- Born: Mattia Raffa; September 16, 1931 (age 95) New York City, U.S.
- Spouse: Mario Cuomo (m. 1954; died 2015)
- Children: 5, including Margaret, Andrew, and Christopher
- Parent: Charles Raffa (father)
- Education: St. John's University 1954
- Occupation: Advocate for women, children, and families

Matilda Cuomo (/ˈkwoʊmoʊ/ KWOH-moh; born Mattia Raffa, September 16, 1931) is an American advocate for women and children, former First Lady of New York from 1983 to 1994, and matriarch of the Cuomo family. She is the widow of Governor of New York Mario Cuomo and the mother of Andrew Cuomo – who also served as Governor of New York before resigning in August 2021 – and former CNN presenter Chris Cuomo. The founder of the child advocacy group Mentoring USA, Cuomo was inducted to the National Women's Hall of Fame in 2017.

== Early life and education ==
Cuomo was born Mattia Raffa in New York to parents, Mary (née Gitto; 1903–1995) and Carmelo "Charles" Raffa (1904–1988), who had immigrated to the United States from Messina, Sicily, Italy. After arriving in the United States in 1927, her father Charles worked to establish his own firm, making supermarket shelves and refrigeration units and later invested in real estate. Cuomo is the third of five children, with older brothers Frank and Sam and younger brother Joseph and sister Nancy.

Cuomo's mother attempted to register her daughter for kindergarten at a Brooklyn elementary school. However, the principal and school registrar threw both out of the registration because her mother could only speak Italian at the time. Years later, Cuomo recalled the registrar yelling, "Get Mrs. Raffa out of here and tell her she can come back when she can speak English," at her mother. During elementary school, Raffa's teachers called her Matilda, rather than her birth name, which was Mattia. She accepted "Matilda" initially out of fear, but the name stuck and she has used Matilda ever since.

Cuomo attended Midwood High School. A capable student who was accepted at Columbia Teachers College, Brooklyn College, and Hunter, she was persuaded by family to attend school closer to home out of concerns for her safety. She further pursued her studies in teaching at St. John's University in Queens, graduating in 1954 from St. John's Teachers College.

Matilda Raffa Cuomo met Mario Cuomo in 1951 in the cafeteria at St. John's University in Queens where they were both enrolled in school. The couple married on June 5, 1954. Cuomo worked as a teacher and supported her husband while he completed law school at St. John's, graduating with a Juris Doctor degree in 1956. Reported as "one of the great love stories," their close public and private partnership lasted 61 years until her husband's death in 2015.

== Notable achievements ==
Cuomo served as First Lady of New York State, where she was highly active in advocating for women, children, and families. She created initiatives that mentored children at-risk, facilitated finding long-term homes for foster children, and strengthened families through providing education, as well as nutrition and immunization programs. Cuomo founded the New York State Mentoring Program in 1984 with the aim of creating one-on-one mentoring opportunities for children and young adults. The state-run program served over 10,000 students and was active with Cuomo as chair until 1995. After the New York State program was discontinued, she transitioned the initiative into Mentoring USA, an international nonprofit child advocacy organization creating mentor relationships for youth ages 7–21. The New York State Mentoring Program was reinstated in 2015. She also chaired the New York State Decade of the Child initiative.

To help support her efforts to advocate for mentoring, Cuomo compiled and edited the book The Person Who Changed My Life: Prominent People Recall Their Mentors, with proceeds going to the Mentoring USA nonprofit organization. Her mentorship book, first published in 1999, was reprinted in 2002 and 2012 featuring a foreword by Hillary Clinton, and in 2016 was recorded as an audio book. Personal essays on mentoring by Joe Torre, Rosie O'Donnell, Dr. Mehmet Oz, Nora Ephron, General Colin Powell, and Cory Booker are included in her book. Cuomo has appeared on the Oprah Winfrey Show to discuss her work in support of mentoring programs.

Cuomo co-chaired the Governor's Commission on Child Care and chaired the NY Citizens' Task Force on the Prevention of Child Abuse and Neglect. She led New York's role in the UN's World Summit for Children in 1990 and the USA's ratification of the UN Convention on the Rights of the Child.

== Awards and recognition ==
Cuomo has received numerous honors for her lifelong work as an educator and advocate for women, children, and families. In 1994, she was presented with the International Fellowship Hall of Fame award by the Coalition for Italo-American Associations in honor of her humanitarian efforts as an advocate for children.

In 2010, she received the Lewis Avenue Alumni Legacy Award from St. John's University.

Cuomo was honored in 2011 with the Champion for New York's Children and Families Award by the Maternity and Early Childhood Foundation in Albany, New York.

She was the distinguished honoree in 2016 at the 75th Anniversary Jubilee for Midwood High School.

Cuomo was the recipient of the first Liberty Partnerships Program Lifetime Achievement Award in 2017 for her work to improve the lives of New York's children through education and mentorship. In 2017, she was inducted into the National Women's Hall of Fame.

== "Matilda's Law" ==
On March 20, 2020, her son, New York Governor Andrew Cuomo, announced a protective order for people over 70 in the state in response to the COVID-19 outbreak. He called it "Matilda's Law" in honor of his mother, and appealed to all citizens to think of their mothers in abiding by the restrictions.

== Personal life ==
Cuomo and her late husband Mario had five children together: daughters Margaret, Maria, and Madeline, and sons Andrew and Christopher. Her elder son, Andrew Cuomo, was New York's 56th governor until his resignation in 2021. Cuomo's daughter Maria Cuomo Cole is a film producer whose projects include Newtown and The Invisible War. Her younger son is journalist Chris Cuomo, and her daughter Margaret Cuomo is a radiologist.
