= Mario Cuomo =

Governor of New York from 1983 to 1994

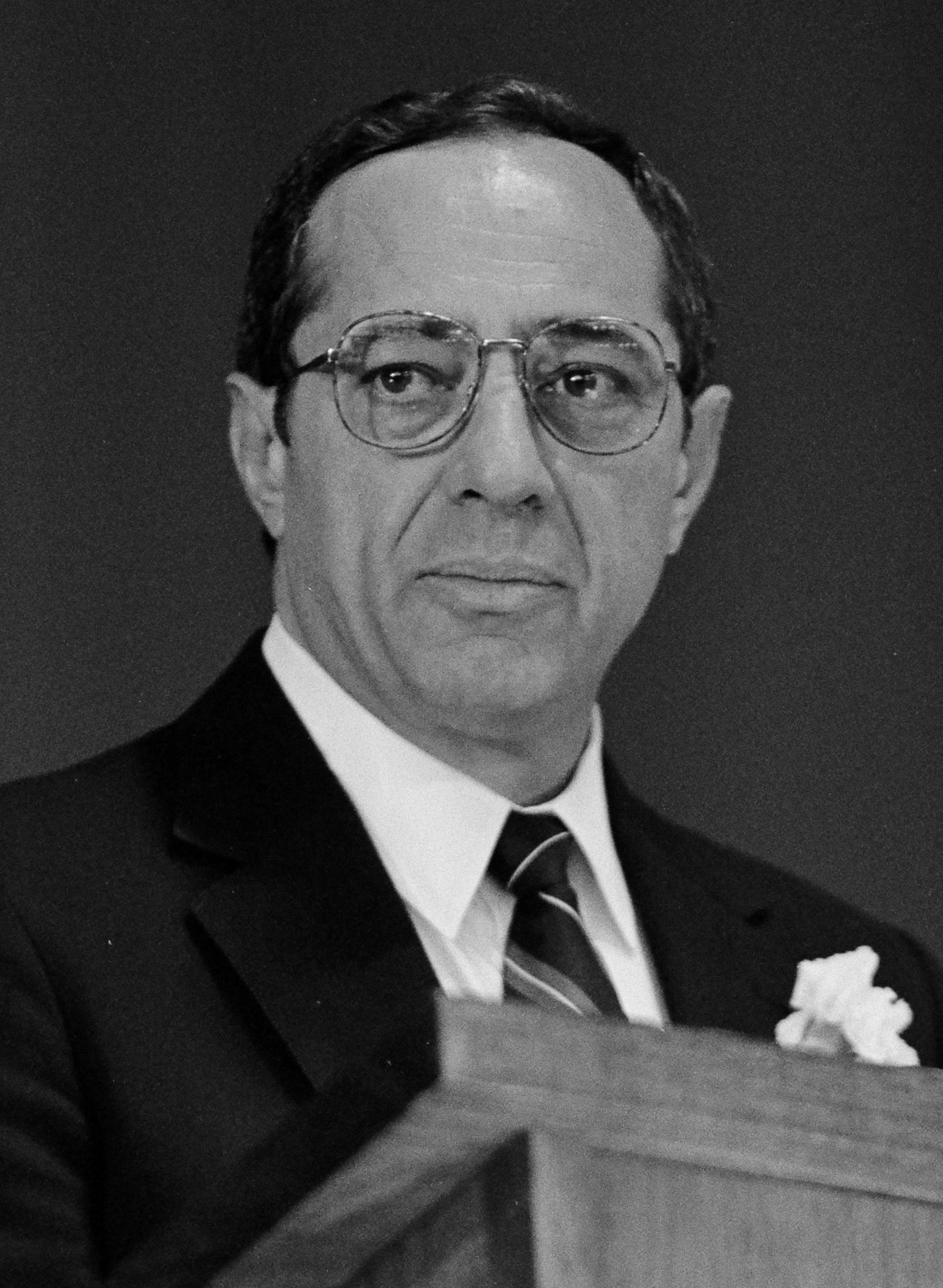
- Cuomo in 1987

52nd Governor of New York
- In office January 1, 1983 – December 31, 1994
- Lieutenant: Alfred DelBello; Warren Anderson (acting); Stan Lundine
- Preceded by: Hugh Carey
- Succeeded by: George Pataki

Lieutenant Governor of New York
- In office January 1, 1979 – December 31, 1982
- Governor: Hugh Carey
- Preceded by: Mary Anne Krupsak
- Succeeded by: Alfred DelBello

57th Secretary of State of New York
- In office January 1, 1975 – December 31, 1978
- Governor: Hugh Carey
- Preceded by: John Ghezzi
- Succeeded by: Basil Paterson

Personal details
- Born: Mario Matthew Cuomo; June 15, 1932 New York City, U.S.
- Died: January 1, 2015 (aged 82) New York City, U.S.
- Resting place: St. John Cemetery
- Party: Democratic
- Other political affiliations: Liberal Party of New York
- Spouse: Matilda Raffa (m. 1954)
- Children: 5, including Margaret, Andrew, and Chris
- Relatives: Cuomo family
- Education: St. John's University (BA, LLB)

Mario Matthew Cuomo (/ˈkwoʊmoʊ/ KWOH-moh, Italian: [ˈmaːrjo ˈkwɔːmo]; June 15, 1932 – January 1, 2015) was an American lawyer and politician who served as the 52nd governor of New York from 1983 to 1995. A member of the Democratic Party, Cuomo previously served as the lieutenant governor of New York from 1979 to 1982 and the secretary of state of New York from 1975 to 1978. He was the father of former New York governor Andrew Cuomo and broadcaster Chris Cuomo.

Cuomo was known for his liberal views and public speeches, particularly his keynote speech address at the 1984 Democratic National Convention in which he sharply criticized the policies of the Reagan administration, saying, "Mr. President, you ought to know that this nation is more a 'Tale of Two Cities' than it is just a shining 'city on a hill.'" He was widely considered a frontrunner for the Democratic nomination for president in both 1988 and 1992, but he ultimately declined to seek the nomination in both instances. His indecisiveness about entering the race led to his being dubbed "Hamlet on the Hudson".

Cuomo was defeated for a fourth term as governor by George Pataki in the Republican Revolution of 1994. He subsequently retired from politics and joined the New York City law firm of Willkie Farr & Gallagher.

== Early life and education ==
Cuomo was born in the Briarwood section of the New York City borough of Queens to a family of Italian origin. His grandfather Donato came to the U.S. in 1896. Mario Cuomo's father, Andrea Cuomo, was born in New York City in 1901 but in 1904, aged two or three, was taken back to a mountain village outside Salerno, Campania, returning to the United States on his U.S. passport more than two decades later. Andrea Cuomo was from Nocera Inferiore, Campania, and his mother—Immacolata Giordano—was from Tramonti, Campania. The family ran Kessler's Grocery Store in South Jamaica, Queens. Mario Cuomo attended New York City P.S. 50 and St. John's Preparatory School.

Cuomo was a baseball player and while attending St. John's University in 1952, he signed as an outfielder with the Pittsburgh Pirates for a $2,000 bonus, which he used to help purchase his wife Matilda's engagement ring. Cuomo played for the Brunswick Pirates of the Class D Georgia–Florida League where his teammates included future major leaguer Fred Green; Cuomo attained a .244 batting average and played center field until he was struck in the back of the head by a pitch. Batting helmets were not yet required equipment, and Cuomo's injury was severe enough that he was hospitalized for six days.

After his recovery, Cuomo gave up baseball and returned to St. John's University, earning his bachelor's degree summa cum laude in 1953. Deciding on a legal career, Cuomo attended St. John's University School of Law and graduated tied for first in his class in 1956. Cuomo clerked for Judge Adrian P. Burke of the New York Court of Appeals. Despite having been a top student, the ethnic prejudice of the time led to his rejection by more than 50 law firms before he was hired by a small but established office in Brooklyn.

During his tenure at the law firm of Comer, Weisbrod, Froeb and Charles, Cuomo represented Fred Trump. Cuomo eventually became a partner at the firm, but stepped down in 1974 to become New York Secretary of State. In 1989, he settled a longstanding lawsuit against his former firm regarding $4 million in legal fees. In addition to practicing law, Cuomo worked as an adjunct professor at St. John's University School of Law.

== Early political career ==
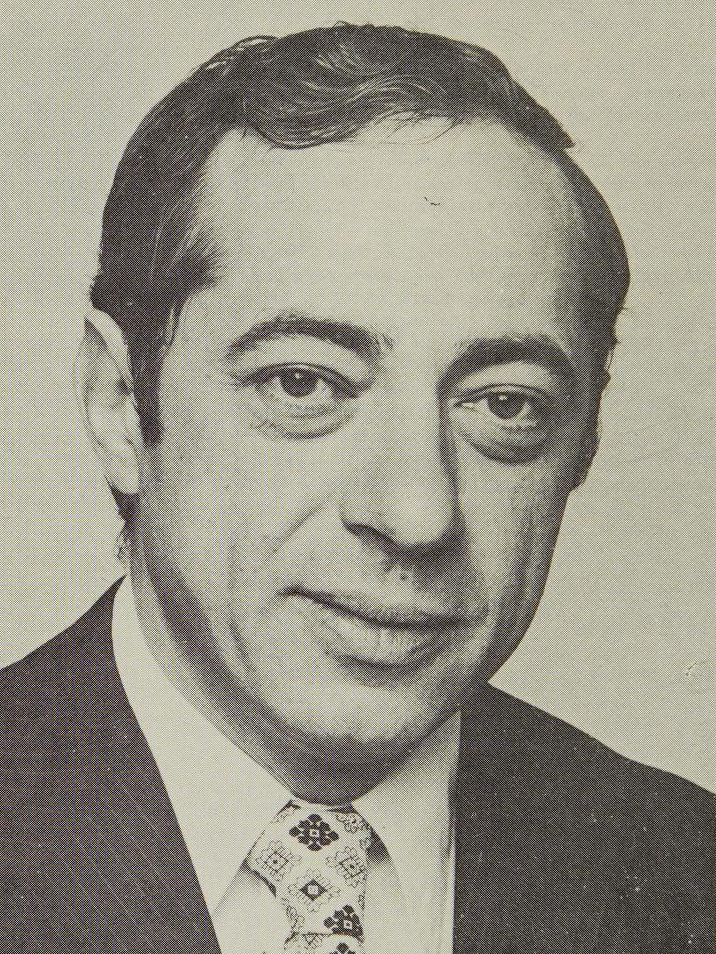
Mario Cuomo in 1975

Cuomo first became widely known in New York City in the late 1960s when he represented "The Corona Fighting 69", a group of 69 home-owners from the Queens neighborhood of Corona, who were threatened with displacement by the city's plan to build a new high school. He later represented another Queens residents group, the Kew Gardens–Forest Hills Committee on Urban Scale, who opposed Samuel J. LeFrak's housing proposal adjacent to Willow Lake in Queens. In 1972, Cuomo became known beyond New York City when Mayor John Lindsay appointed him to conduct an inquiry and mediate a dispute over low-income public housing slated for the upper-middle-class neighborhood of Forest Hills. Cuomo described his experience in that dispute in the book Forest Hills Diary, and the story was retold by sociologist Richard Sennett in The Fall of Public Man.

=== New York secretary of state ===
In 1974, Cuomo ran in the primary for lieutenant governor of New York on a slate headed by gubernatorial candidate Howard J. Samuels, and both won the nomination of the Democratic State Committee at the party convention. But their entire ticket, including the nominees for attorney general and U.S. senator was defeated in the Democratic primary election: Samuels by Rep. Hugh Carey of Brooklyn, and Cuomo by state senator Mary Anne Krupsak.

Governor-elect Carey chose to bring Cuomo into his new administration, naming him in December as his choice for Secretary of State of New York. Cuomo served until December 1978, and was succeeded as Secretary of State by Basil Paterson.

=== New York City mayoral election ===
Two years later, Cuomo ran for Mayor of New York City at Carey's urging. Incumbent Mayor Abraham Beame was very unpopular and Cuomo was one of five major challengers to Beame in the Democratic primary. In a close and highly fractured election, U.S. Representative Ed Koch finished first with 19.81% of the vote and Cuomo came second with 18.74%. As no candidate cleared 40% of the vote, Koch and Cuomo advanced to a runoff. Koch emerged victorious with 54.94% of the vote to Cuomo's 45.06%. Cuomo had received the nomination of the Liberal Party several months previously and was urged to drop out of the race but he contested the general election against Koch and token Republican opposition.

During the mayoral campaign, placards appeared saying: "Vote for Cuomo, not the homo" in reference to rumors about Koch's sexuality. Cuomo denied responsibility for this but Koch never forgave him "as he made clear with a pointedly disparaging reference to Mr. Cuomo in a recorded interview with The New York Times that was not to be made public until Mr. Koch's death". Cuomo ran on his opposition to the death penalty, which backfired among New Yorkers as crime was very high. Cuomo then went negative with ads that likened Koch to unpopular former mayor John Lindsay. Meanwhile, Koch backers accused Cuomo of antisemitism and pelted Cuomo campaign cars with eggs. Cuomo was also defeated by Koch in the general election, taking 40.97% to Koch's 49.99%. The race is discussed in Jonathan Mahler's book Ladies and Gentlemen, the Bronx Is Burning.

=== New York lieutenant governor ===
In 1978, incumbent lieutenant governor Krupsak declined to seek re-election. She withdrew from the ticket and unsuccessfully challenged Carey in the gubernatorial primary, accusing him of incompetence. Cuomo won the primary for lieutenant governor and was elected alongside Carey in the general election.

== Governor of New York (1983–1994) ==
=== Elections ===
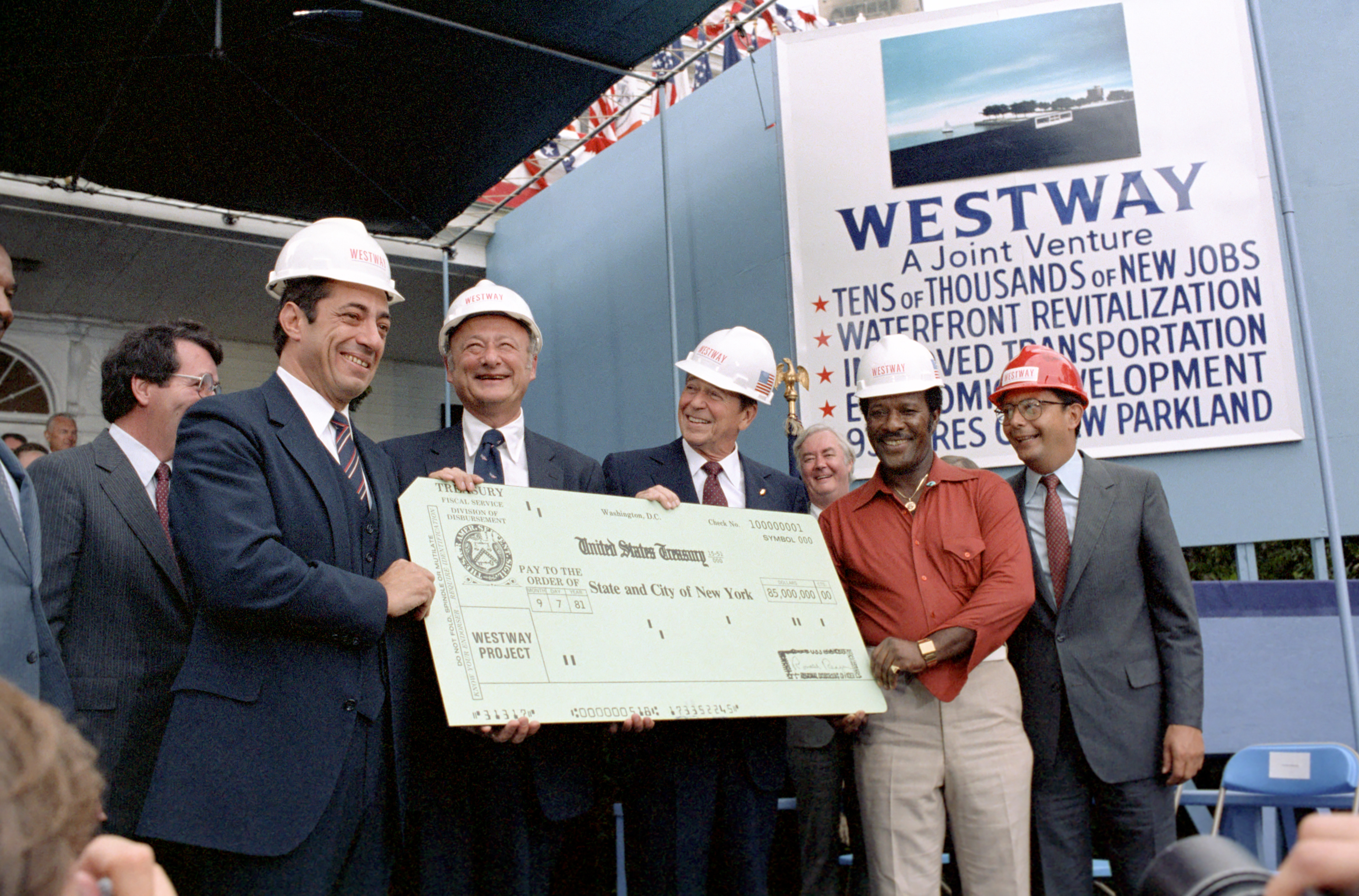
President Ronald Reagan presenting Mario Cuomo and other New York leaders with a check for Westway Project Funds, September 1981

In 1982, Carey declined to run for re-election and Cuomo declared his candidacy. He once again faced Ed Koch in the Democratic primary. This time, Koch's support for the death penalty backfired and he alienated many voters from outside New York City when, in an interview with Playboy magazine, he described the lifestyle of both suburbia and upstate New York as "sterile" and lamented the thought of having to live in "the small town" of Albany as governor, saying it was "a city without a good Chinese restaurant". Cuomo won the primary by ten points and faced Republican nominee businessman Lewis Lehrman in the general election. With the recession aiding Democratic candidates, Cuomo beat Lehrman 50.91% to 47.48%.

Cuomo actively campaigned for Walter Mondale in the 1984 presidential election, and was named on Mondale's list of vice presidential candidates. Geraldine Ferraro was ultimately nominated as his running mate, but Cuomo was chosen to give the keynote speech at the 1984 Democratic National Convention in San Francisco. He vigorously attacked Ronald Reagan's record and policies in his Tale of Two Cities speech that brought him to national attention, most memorably saying: "There is despair, Mr. President, in the faces that you don't see, in the places that you don't visit, in your shining city." He was immediately considered one of the frontrunners for the Democratic nomination for president in 1988 and 1992.

Cuomo was re-elected in 1986 against Republican nominee Andrew P. O'Rourke by 64.3% to 31.77%. He ruled out the possibility of running in the 1988 presidential election, announcing on February 19, 1987, that he would not run, and then going on to publicly decline draft movements in the wake of Gary Hart's withdrawal following the Donna Rice affair.

In the 1990 gubernatorial election, Cuomo was re-elected with 53.17% of the vote to Republican Pierre Andrew Rinfret's 21.35% and Conservative Herbert London's 20.40%.

When Cuomo was asked if he was planning to run for president in 1992, he said, "I have no plans and no plans to make plans," but he refused to rule it out. In October 1991, news broke that he was interested in running and was taking advice from consultant Bob Shrum. At the same time, he began working on a budget with the New York State Legislature, and promised not to make any announcements about a presidential run until he had reached an agreement with the Republican-controlled State Senate and the Democratic-controlled State Assembly. Two polls taken in November of the New Hampshire Democratic primary showed him leading the field by at least twenty points, and a poll in December showed him trailing President George H. W. Bush 48% to 43%, having been behind by twenty-eight points two months earlier.

The filing deadline for the New Hampshire primary was on December 20, 1991, and candidates were required to submit a ballot application in person. Cuomo was not able to negotiate a budget agreement with Republicans in the Legislature and on deadline day, time ran out. In a scene later fictionalized in Joe Klein's Primary Colors, he kept an airplane idling on the tarmac as he pondered abandoning the budget talks in order to fly to New Hampshire and enter the race. Democratic party leaders asked him to run and he prepared two statements, one in case he ran and one in case he did not. He tried to come to a final agreement over the budget, but as he could not, he made an announcement at 3:30 p.m. that day:

It is my responsibility as governor to deal with this extraordinarily severe problem. Were it not, I would travel to New Hampshire today and file my name as a candidate in this presidential primary. That was my hope and I prepared for it. But it seemed to me that I cannot turn my attention to New Hampshire while this threat hangs over the head of the New Yorkers I have sworn to put first.

Cuomo's supporters launched a draft movement and encouraged people to write in his name in the Democratic primary, which was held on February 18, 1992. Cuomo did not discourage it, which many saw as implicit endorsement of the campaign. Cuomo went on to receive 6,577 votes in the primary, 3.92% of the total cast and subsequently asked the draft committee to close down, saying, "I am flattered by their support and impressed by their commitment, but I am also convinced that in fairness to themselves they ought now to end their effort." The group closed down, but Cuomo refused to rule out joining the primaries later in the year, stating, "I have said more than once that the nomination should go to someone willing and able to campaign for it. I am willing, but because New York's budget has not been settled I am not able to campaign for it." Ultimately, Cuomo did not enter the race and Bill Clinton went on to win the Democratic nomination and the general election. Because of Cuomo's refusal to run for national office, despite his popularity, he was referred to as the "Hamlet on the Hudson".

After Bill Clinton won the Democratic nomination for president in 1992, Cuomo was a candidate for vice president but he refused to be considered and did not make Clinton's final shortlist. He was also spoken of as a candidate for nomination to the United States Supreme Court, but when President Clinton was considering nominees during his first term to replace the retiring Byron White, Cuomo stated he was not interested in the office. George Stephanopoulos wrote in 1999 that Clinton came within 15 minutes of nominating Cuomo before the latter pre-emptively rejected the post.

In 1994, Cuomo ran for a fourth term. In this election, Republicans attacked him for the weak economic recovery within the state since the early 1990s recession and the resulting high unemployment as well as his opposition to the death penalty by highlighting the case of Arthur Shawcross, a multiple murderer convicted of manslaughter who was paroled by the state in 1987 and while on release became a serial killer. Republicans were able to associate Shawcross with Cuomo much like William Horton with Michael Dukakis six years earlier. Cuomo was defeated by George Pataki in the 1994 Republican landslide, taking 45.4% of the vote to Pataki's 48.8%. Cuomo lost mainly because his support outside of New York City all but vanished; he only carried one county outside the five boroughs, Albany County, while also failing to sweep the five boroughs unlike his previous three successful runs, losing Staten Island.

Cuomo and fellow Democrat Ann Richards, the governor of Texas who had been defeated in her re-election campaign by George W. Bush, appeared in a series of humorous Super Bowl XXIX television advertisements for the snack food Doritos shortly afterwards, in which they discussed the "sweeping changes" occurring. The changes they were discussing turned out to be the new Doritos packaging.

=== Accomplishments ===
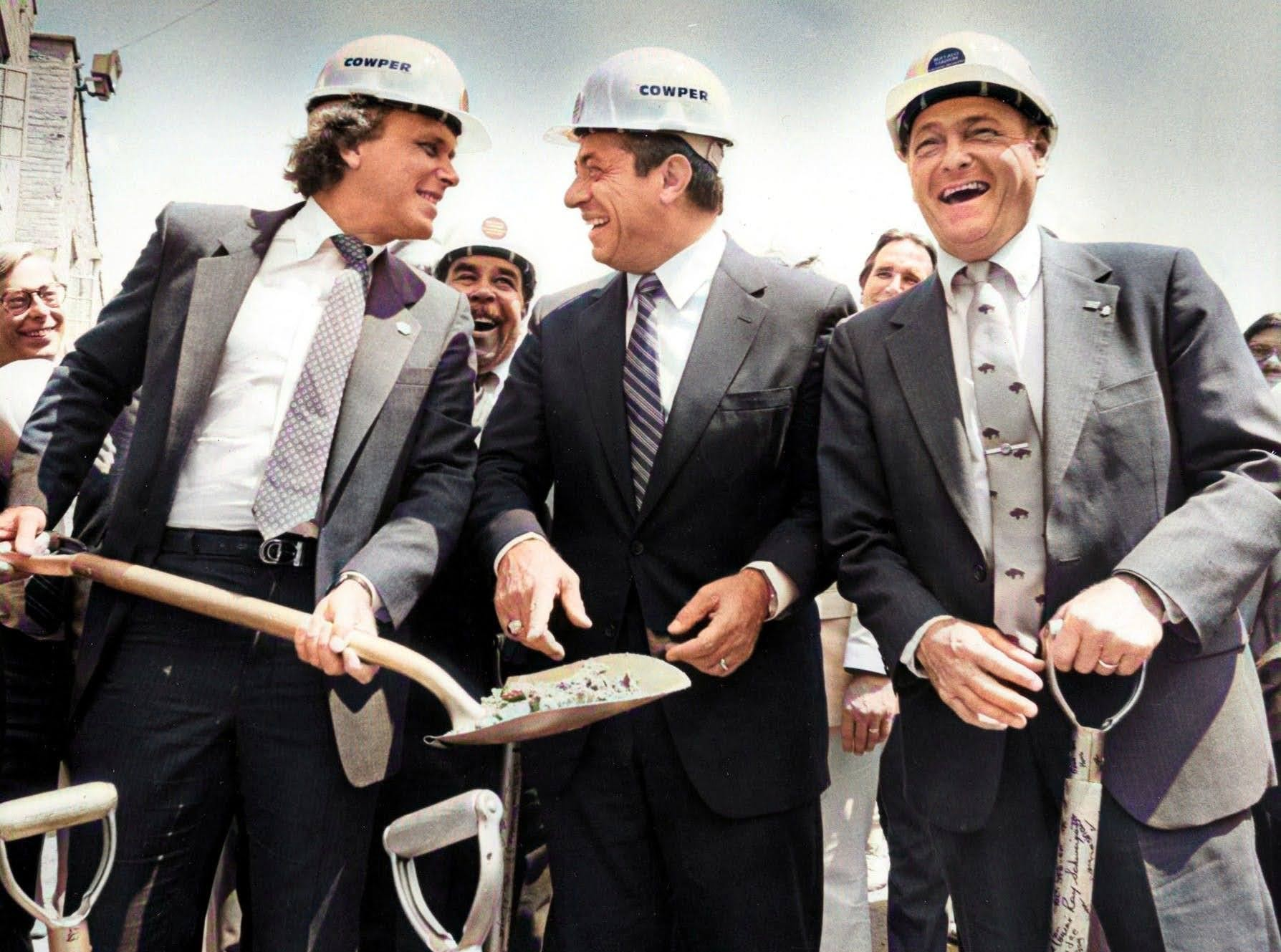
Groundbreaking of Pilot Field in July 1986. From left to right: Buffalo Bisons owner Robert E. Rich Jr., Governor Mario Cuomo and Buffalo Mayor James D. Griffin.

In Cuomo's first term as Governor of New York, he produced a balanced budget and earned the highest credit rating over the long term for the State in one decade. His philosophy in leading the state was one of "progressive pragmatism". Cuomo and the Democratic-controlled House of Representatives (Democrats had over a 3:2 margin in House) was successful in stopping U.S. President Ronald Reagan's administration from eliminating "federal income tax deductibility of state, local and property taxes".

During his second term as governor, Cuomo successfully pushed for the enactment of sweeping fiscal reforms for the State. Comprehensive reform measures were also enacted in governmental ethics for New York State under Cuomo's leadership. Cuomo extended New York State's economic reach in business globally, contributing to both strengthening and developing it.

Cuomo is also known for beginning the "Decade of the Child" initiative, an effort that included multiple health care and educational strategies to better the lives of children in New York State. Further, in 1988, the "Rebuild NY" Transportation Bond Act was an initiative under Cuomo that was a continuance of efforts to rebuild bridges and roads throughout the State. Cuomo increased assistance to local law enforcement agencies in order to help reduce or eliminate crime; and prison expansion in the State was continued which he is said to have regretted. Under Cuomo, New York State was also the first in the nation to enact seat belt laws.

Cuomo established the Office of the MTA Inspector General (OIG) in 1983, as an independent watchdog for the Metropolitan Transportation Authority. The OIG provides oversight and monitors the activities of the MTA.

Governor Mario and his wife Matilda Cuomo presided over the First New York State Family Support Conference in 1988. His statewide initiatives in developing over 1,000 family support programs are today termed "individual and family support" nationwide and are cited by the National Council on Disability. He was the first governor to support an ecological approach to families which was represented by community integration and community development as the goal of deinstitutionalization.

Healthcare was also an area that Cuomo improved as governor, implementing initiatives that succeeded in reducing costs of prescription medications. This endeavor assisted senior citizens in making the medications more affordable. Under Cuomo's leadership, a public health plan that tackled the AIDS epidemic was the most intense in the nation.

Overseeing programs for environmental preservation and conservation, Cuomo implemented aggressive initiatives in these areas. Under Cuomo's leadership, New York State was the first in the United States to integrate both environmental protection and energy conservation goals.

Cuomo's progressivism was also evident in his appointments of judges to the New York Court of Appeals. Cuomo appointed all of the judges to the State Appeals Court, including the first two female judges, as well as both the first African-American and Hispanic judges.

Cuomo eliminated the New York State Regents Scholarship given to all students who ranked high on a statewide special examination.

== Planned assassination ==
Maurizio Avola, a former Sicilian Mafioso believed to have killed about 80 people, including journalists, lawyers, politicians and mobsters, before becoming a pentito, or informer, and serving life in prison, told The Guardian in 2016 that the Sicilian Mafia had planned to assassinate Governor Cuomo on a visit to Italy in November 1992. The plan was for about a dozen gunmen armed with Kalashnikov assault rifles and explosives to ambush Cuomo. Avola's godfather, Aldo Ercolano, considered that Cuomo would be an "excellent target". Avola stated, "The aim was to target politicians or members of institutions in order to send out a clear message... Killing a prominent American was a warning to law enforcement agencies that had allowed several prominent mafia informants to live in the U.S. under assumed identities." This was several months after the mafia had already assassinated antimafia judges Giovanni Falcone and Paolo Borsellino. The attack was to be carried out in the main square of Messina, Sicily during the day. However, after Cuomo arrived in Rome on November 19 with security consisting of many bodyguards and a bulletproof car, the attack was called off.

== Political views ==
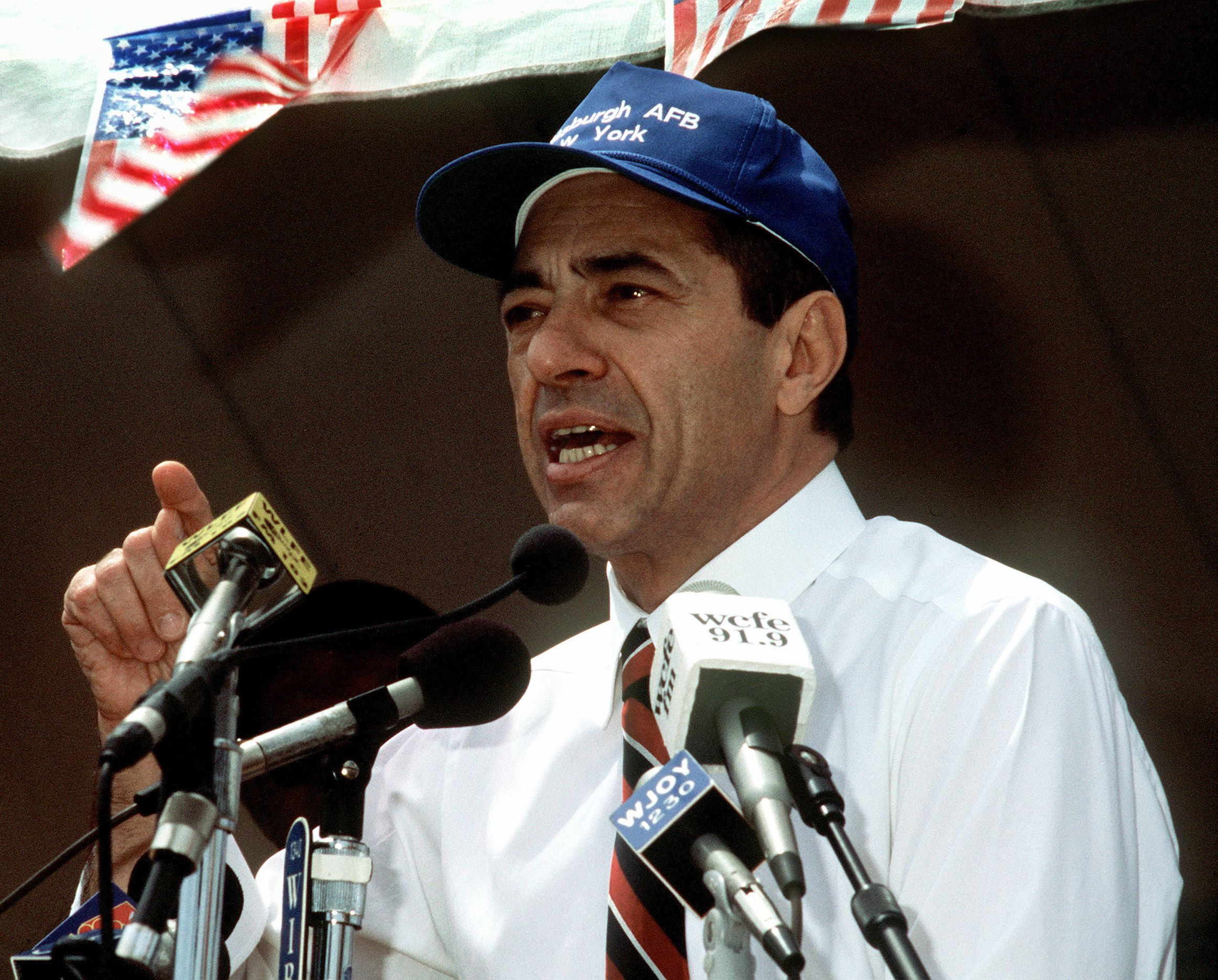
Governor Cuomo speaking at a rally in 1991 in Plattsburgh, New York

Cuomo was notable for his liberal political views, particularly his steadfast opposition to the death penalty, an opinion that was unpopular in New York during the high-crime era of the 1980s and early 1990s. While governor, he vetoed several bills that would have re-established capital punishment in New York State. The death penalty was reinstated by Pataki the year after he defeated Cuomo in the 1994 election, although it was never put into effect and the statute was declared unconstitutional by the New York Court of Appeals in 2004.

Cuomo, a Roman Catholic, was personally opposed to abortion, but he was pro-choice on the issue, believing that the State does not have the right to ban the procedure. In a speech at the University of Notre Dame on September 13, 1984, he used the statements of the American Catholic hierarchy to make an argument: "What is ideally desirable isn't always feasible, ... there can be different political approaches to abortion besides unyielding adherence to an absolute prohibition." For this position, Cardinal John Joseph O'Connor considered excommunicating him.

Cuomo supported universal health care, believing that the federal government should provide coverage to anyone who otherwise couldn't get it, as well as price caps on medical bills. Cuomo was convinced that poor, elderly and unemployed people would never receive quality health care without government intervention.

Cuomo was also outspoken on what he perceived to be the unfair stereotyping of Italian Americans as mobsters by the media, including denying the existence of the Mafia, and urging the media to stop using the word "mafia". Joseph Pistone, an FBI agent widely known for his undercover operation as Donnie Brasco, wrote disparagingly of Cuomo in his book, Unfinished Business.

Cuomo opposed the move of the National Football League's New York Giants and New York Jets to the Meadowlands in East Rutherford, New Jersey, choosing instead to attend the home games of the Buffalo Bills while serving as governor, referring to the Bills as "New York State's only team".

== Post-governorship ==
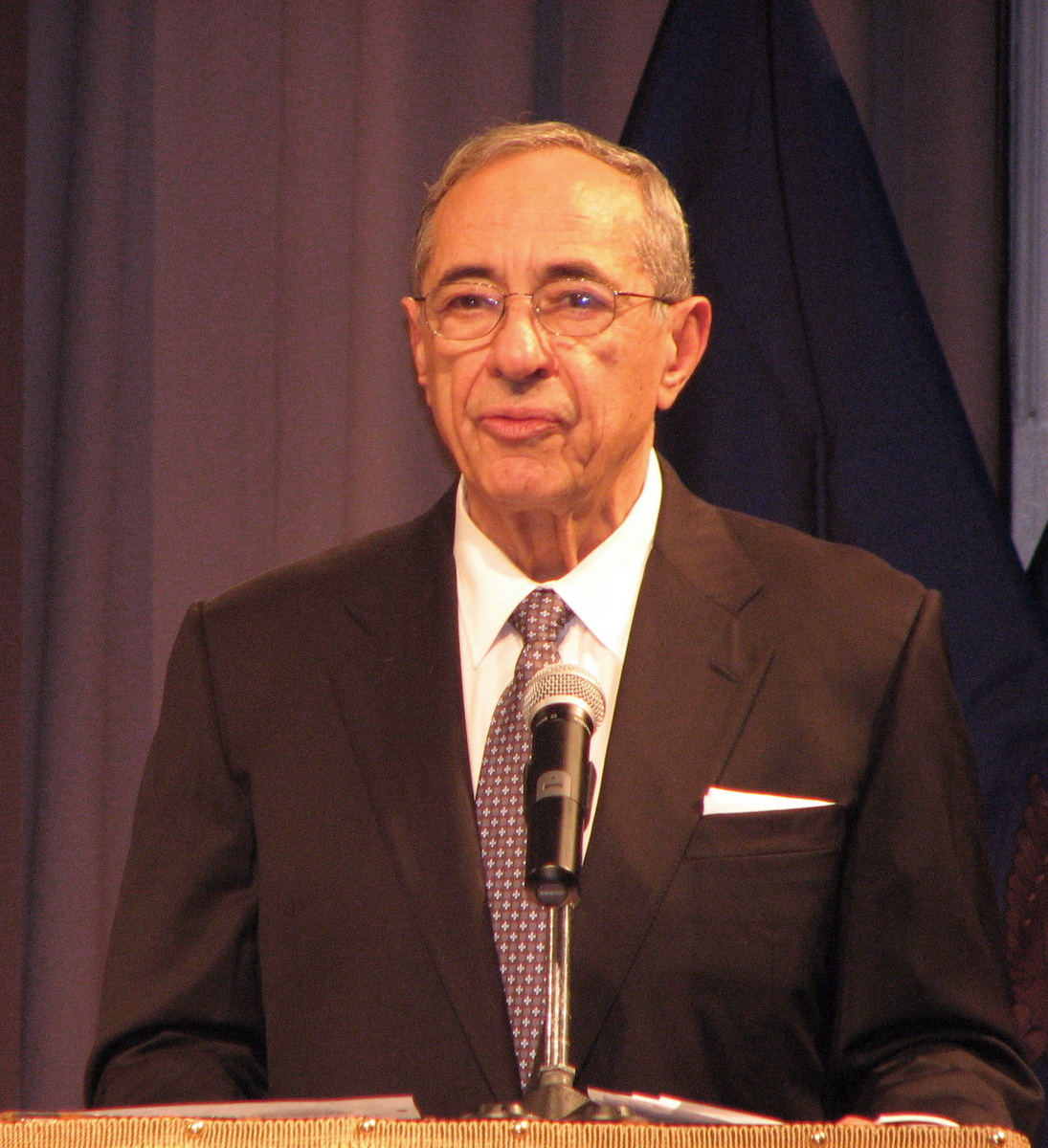
Mario Cuomo giving a speech in 2007

=== Legal work and board memberships ===
From 1995 until his death, Cuomo worked as counsel at the New York law firm, Willkie Farr & Gallagher. In 1996, Cuomo joined the board of Medallion Financial Corp., a lender to purchasers of taxi medallions in leading cities across the U.S. He was named to the board through his personal and business relationship with Andrew M. Murstein, president of Medallion. Cuomo also sat on the advisory council of the Abraham Lincoln Bicentennial Commission.

From 1995 to 1996, Cuomo hosted a nationally syndicated talk radio show on WABC on weekends but ended the program in July 1996 to assist the Democratic National Committee for the 1996 elections.

=== Authorship ===
External videos
- Booknotes interview with Cuomo on Why Lincoln Matters, July 25, 2004, C-SPAN

Cuomo's first book, Forest Hills Diary: The Crisis of Low-income Housing, became an influential text in the fields of political science and housing policy, and it helped make his name with the public outside New York.

In 1996, Cuomo wrote Reason to Believe. He also wrote a narrative essay titled "Achieving the American Dream" about his parents' struggles in coming to America and how they prospered. Cuomo was the author of Why Lincoln Matters, published in 2004, and he co-edited Lincoln on Democracy, an anthology of Abraham Lincoln's speeches.

Cuomo also wrote and delivered numerous speeches and remarks.

==== Selected works ====
- Cuomo, M. (2012). Greatest speeches of the 20th century: Keynote address for the Democratic Convention. Various artists. (MP3).
- Cuomo, M. (2011). Inspirational Speeches, Volume 3: Mario Cuomo – 1984. Orange Leisure. (MP3).
- Williams, F.J., & Pederson, W.D. (Eds)., with Cuomo, M. (Contributor) and 14 other contributors (2009). Lincoln lessons: Reflections on America's greatest leader. Southern Illinois University Press.
- Grodin, E.D., Cuomo, M., & Ventura, M. (2008). C is for ciao: An Italy alphabet. Sleeping Bear Press.
- Bennett, T., Sullivan, R., Cuomo, M., & Albom, M. (2007). Tony Bennett in the studio: A life of art & music. Sterling.
- Heffner, R.D., Jaffe, M., & Cuomo, M.M. (2004). As they saw it: A half-century of conversations from the open mind. Carrol & Graf
- Forsythe, D.W., & Cuomo, M. (2004). Memos to the governor: An introduction to state budgeting, 2nd edition. Georgetown University Press.
- Cuomo, M., & Holzer, H. (Eds.) (2004). Lincoln on democracy. Fordham University Press.
- Cuomo, M.M. (2004). Why Lincoln matters: Today more than ever. Houghton Mifflin Harcourt.
- Cuomo, M. (1999). The Blue Spruce. Sleeping Bear Press.
- Hoobler, D., Hoobler, T., & Cuomo, M.M. (1998). The Italian American family album. USA: Oxford University Press.
- Cuomo, M. (1996). Reason to believe: A keen assessment of who we are and an inspiring vision of what we could be. Touchstone.
- Cuomo, M.M. (1993). More than words: The speeches of Mario Cuomo. St. Martin's Press.
- Thomas, C., Cuomo, M., & Jorling (1992). New York State: A land of forests, people and trees, partners in time. New York State Department of Environmental Conservation.
- Cuomo, M. (1984). Diaries of Mario M. Cuomo: The campaign for governor. Random House.
- Cuomo, M. (1975). Forest Hills Diary: The Crisis of Low-income Housing. Vantage

== Honors and awards ==
At its 1983 commencement ceremonies, Barnard College awarded Cuomo its highest honor, the Barnard Medal of Distinction. Also in 1983, Yeshiva University awarded him an honorary Doctor of Laws degree.

In 2017, Governor Andrew Cuomo signed legislation officially naming the Tappan Zee Bridge replacement the "Governor Mario M. Cuomo Bridge". This has been met with significant opposition. A petition and several pieces of proposed legislation have sought to restore the bridge's name to that of its predecessor.

== Family and personal life ==
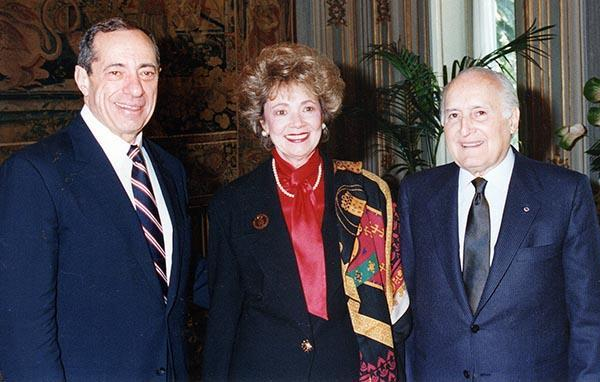
Mario and Matilda Cuomo with Italian president Oscar Luigi Scalfaro during a 1992 visit to Rome

Cuomo was married for 60 years to Matilda (née Raffa), from 1954 until his death in 2015. She is a graduate of St. John's University's Teachers College. They had five children, Margaret, Andrew, Maria, Madeline, and Christopher. In 2017, Matilda was inducted into the National Women's Hall of Fame.

Cuomo's oldest son Andrew married Kerry Kennedy, a daughter of Robert F. and Ethel Skakel Kennedy, on June 9, 1990. They had three daughters, twins Cara Ethel and Mariah Matilda Cuomo, born on January 11, 1995; and Michaela Andrea Cuomo, born on August 26, 1997. The couple divorced in 2005. Andrew served as Secretary of Housing and Urban Development under President Bill Clinton from 1997 to 2001. In his first attempt to succeed his father, he ran as Democratic candidate for New York governor in 2002, but withdrew before the primary. He withdrew after criticizing Republican incumbent George Pataki's leadership following the terrorist attacks on the city on September 11 the previous year. In November 2006, Andrew was elected New York State Attorney General; and on November 2, 2010, he was elected Governor of New York, inaugurated on January 1, 2011, and was re-elected two more times, serving until he resigned in August 2021 due to sexual harassment allegations.

Cuomo's younger son Chris was a journalist on the ABC Network news magazine Primetime. He anchored news segments and served as co-host on Good Morning America, before moving to CNN in 2013, where he co-hosted the morning news magazine New Day. He anchored his own prime time show Cuomo Prime Time until he was suspended and ultimately fired in 2021 for assisting his brother Andrew in navigating a sexual harassment scandal which had previously led to Andrew's resignation as Governor of New York and after two accusations of sexual harassment against Chris were made. He was picked as one of People magazine's 50 Most Beautiful People in 1997.

Cuomo's daughter Maria is married to fashion designer Kenneth Cole. She is chair of the Board of HELP USA, a charitable foundation that is also associated with the organization her mother founded, Mentoring USA.

His daughter Margaret is "a board certified radiologist, teaching professional, and national advocate for the prevention of cancer, heart disease, and diabetes". She is the author of A World Without Cancer: The Making of a New World and the Real Promise of Prevention (2013), and she serves on the board of directors of the nonprofit organization, LessCancer. She has been featured on such TV shows as Good Morning America, Good Day New York, Morning Joe, and Inside Edition. In 2011, she was awarded the Commendation of the Order of the Star by the president and prime minister of Italy.

Cuomo remained a baseball fan after his athletic career ended, reportedly limiting his television watching to baseball games and C-SPAN. He was an avid player of fantasy baseball, always with an Italian-American player on his team, regardless of how many Italian-American players were available or how well they were doing. In 1994, he was featured several times on the Ken Burns PBS series Baseball, where he shared memories of his life in baseball before he entered politics.

Cuomo was the first guest on the long-running CNN talk show Larry King Live that began in 1985 and ended in 2010.

Neal Conan described Cuomo as both the most intelligent and wittiest politician he has ever interviewed.

== Illness and death ==
On November 30, 2014, it was announced that Cuomo had been hospitalized for a heart condition; he was described as being "in good spirits".

On January 1, 2015, Andrew Cuomo was sworn in for his second term as governor. The elder Cuomo was not well enough to attend the inaugural ceremony, though his son remarked, "He is in the heart and mind of every person who is here. He is here and his inspiration and his legacy and his experience is what has brought the state to this point." That afternoon Mario Cuomo died from heart failure at his home in Manhattan at 5:15 p.m. EST, at the age of 82.

Cuomo's wake was held on January 5, 2015, and his funeral was held at Saint Ignatius Loyola Church in Manhattan on January 6. He is interred at St. John Cemetery, in Middle Village, Queens.

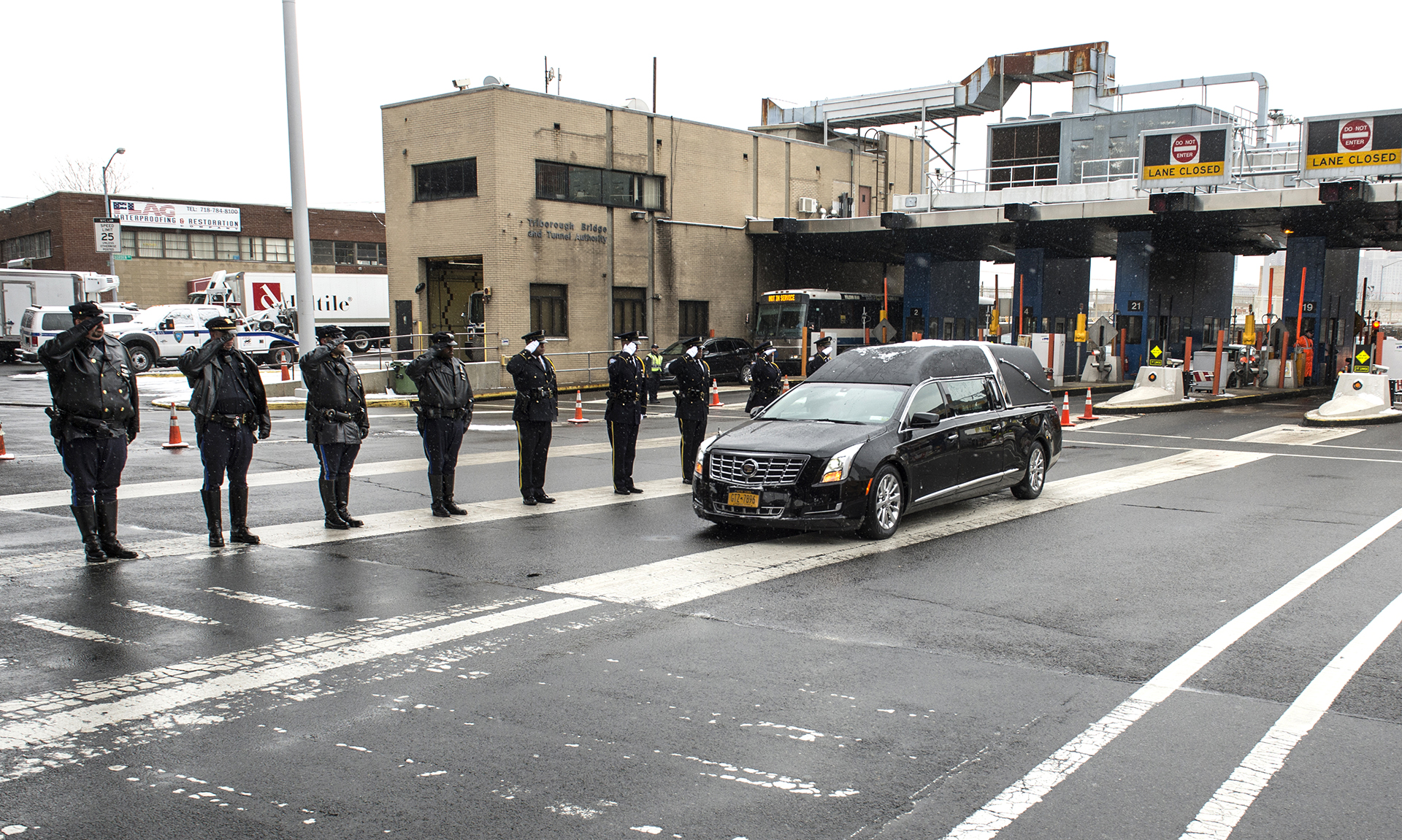
Officers of the Metropolitan Transportation Authority and a state police honor guard saluting Cuomo's hearse as it passes through the Queens–Midtown Tunnel, January 6, 2015

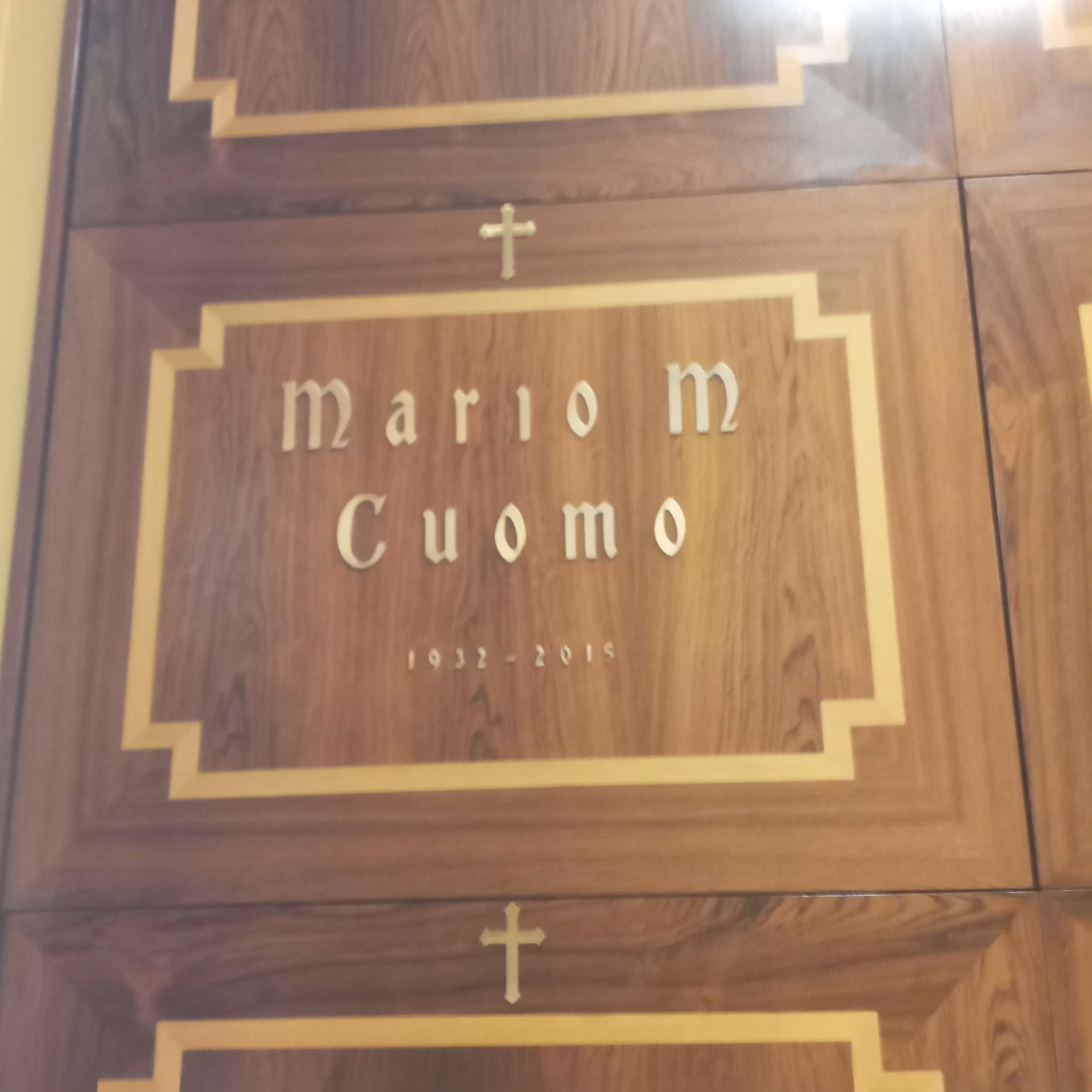
The niche of Governor Mario Cuomo

=== Reactions ===
Various elected officials praised Cuomo following his death. President Barack Obama stated: "An Italian Catholic kid from Queens, born to immigrant parents, Mario paired his faith in God and faith in America to live a life of public service – and we are all better for it. He rose to be chief executive of the state he loved, a determined champion of progressive values, and an unflinching voice for tolerance, inclusiveness, fairness, dignity, and opportunity. His own story taught him that as Americans, we are bound together as one people, and our country's success rests on the success of all of us, not just a fortunate few."

Then-Vice President Joe Biden described Cuomo as "a forceful voice for civil rights, for equal rights, for economic opportunity and justice. He had the courage to stand by his convictions, even when it was unpopular." Former Governor of New York George Pataki called Cuomo "a proud son of immigrants and a compassionate leader who possessed a soaring intellect". Former Mayor of New York City Rudy Giuliani stated: "Mario was a giant political influence of his generation. His ability to make riveting political speeches was only exceeded by his ability to logically argue and defend his position."

== Legacy ==
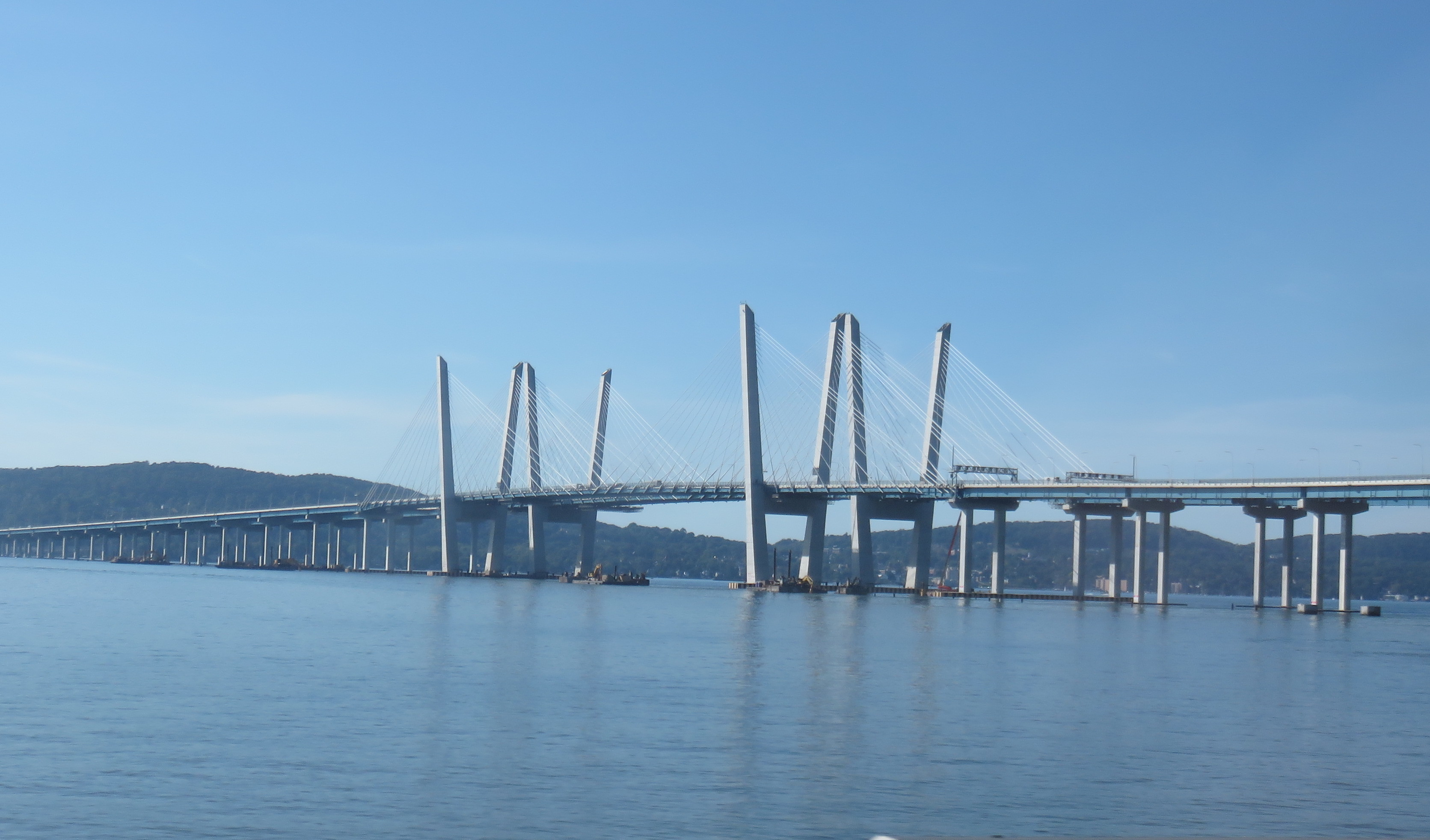
The rebuilt Tappan Zee Bridge was named in Cuomo's honor.

Cuomo and Ed Koch are remembered as two New York politicians who dominated during the late 1970s and 1980s, as well for his public speaking ability.

The rebuilt Tappan Zee Bridge was renamed the Governor Mario M. Cuomo Bridge in his honor. However, this would be controversial as the old bridge was named after Malcolm Wilson.

His legacy also ran in his family, with the election of his son Andrew Cuomo in 2010. Andrew Cuomo would serve as governor for ten years, from 2011 until his resignation in 2021.

== See also ==
- Bill Clinton Supreme Court candidates

Political offices
Preceded by John Ghezzi	Secretary of State of New York; 1975–1978	Succeeded by Basil Paterson
Preceded by Mary Anne Krupsak	Lieutenant Governor of New York; 1979–1982	Succeeded by Alfred DelBello
Preceded by Hugh Carey	Governor of New York; 1983–1994	Succeeded by George Pataki
Party political offices
Preceded by Albert Blumenthal	Liberal nominee for Mayor of New York City; 1977	Succeeded by Mary Codd
Preceded by Mary Anne Krupsak	Democratic nominee for Lieutenant Governor of New York; 1978	Succeeded by Alfred DelBello
Preceded by Hugh Carey	Democratic nominee for Governor of New York; 1982, 1986, 1990, 1994	Succeeded by Peter Vallone
Preceded by Hugh Carey	Liberal Party nominee for Governor of New York; 1982, 1986, 1990, 1994	Succeeded by Betsy McCaughey
Preceded by Mo Udall	Keynote Speaker at the Democratic National Convention; 1984	Succeeded by Ann Richards
