= Moreland Commission to Investigate Public Corruption =

New York State corruption commission launched in 2013

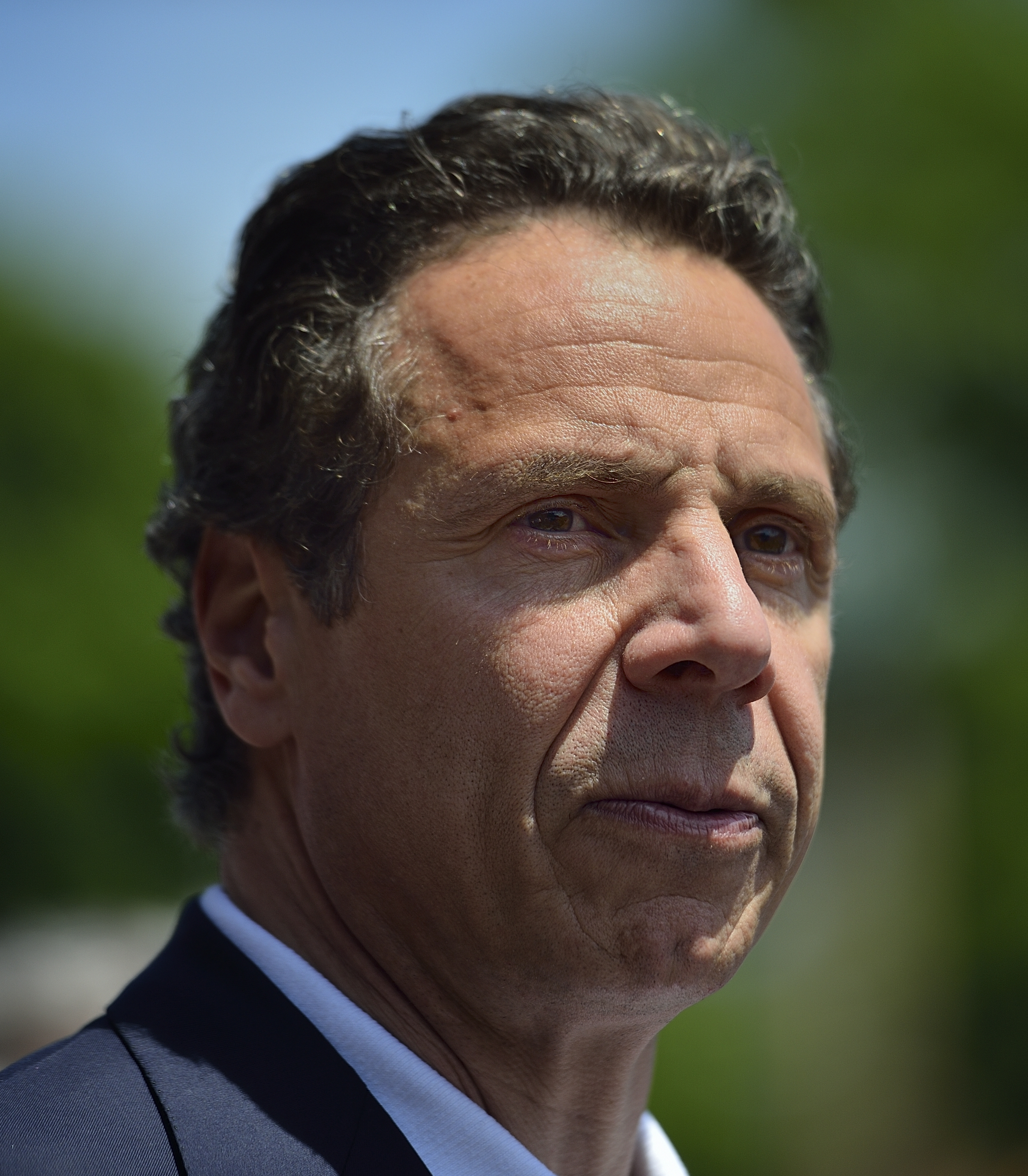
Governor Cuomo

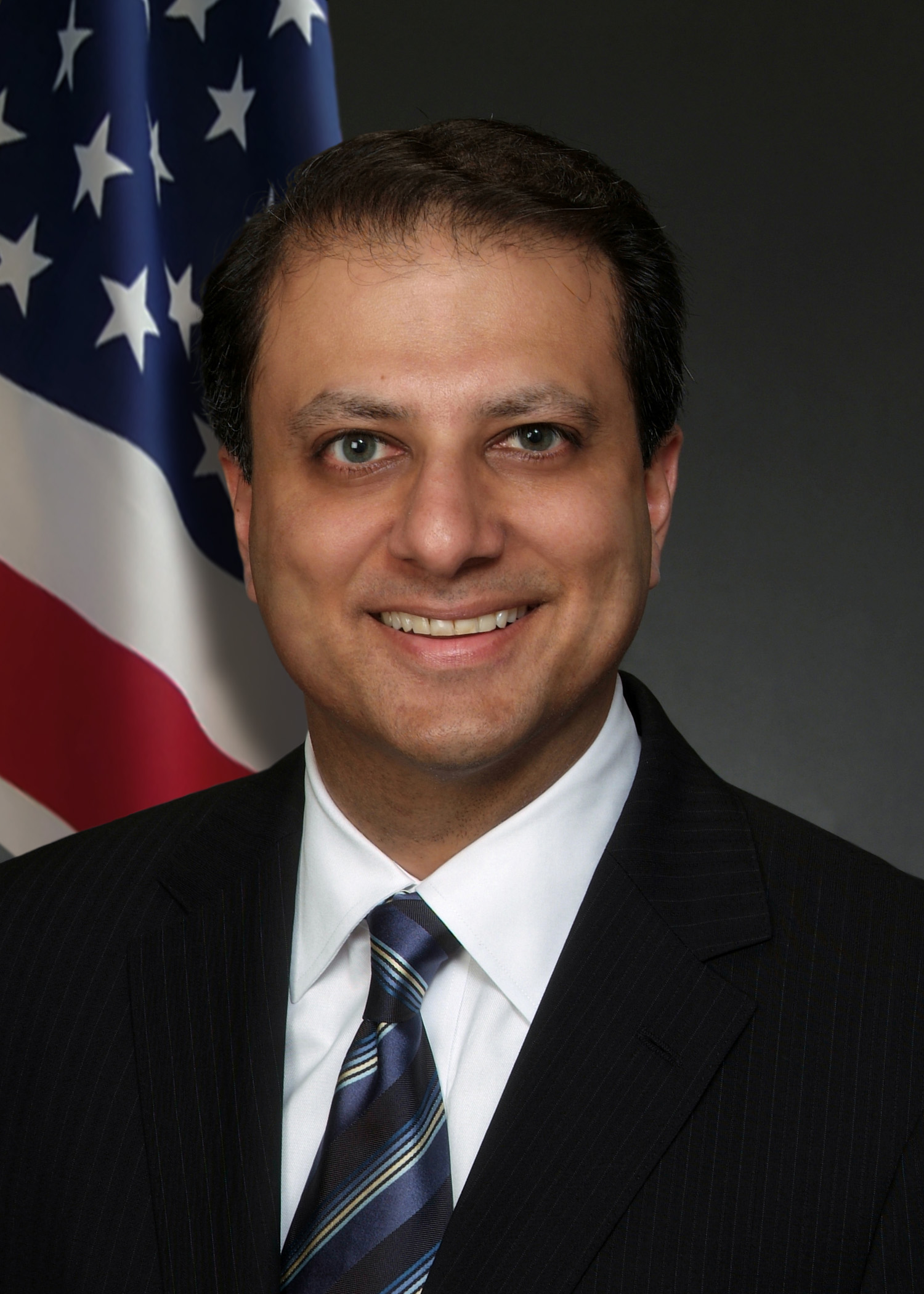
Ex-U.S. Attorney Preet Bharara

The Commission to Investigate Public Corruption was a public entity created by New York governor Andrew Cuomo in July 2013 under the state's Moreland Act, with the aim of investigating politicians and political organizations in New York for violations of state laws regulating elections, campaigns and political fundraising. Cuomo disbanded the commission after approving modest ethics reform in March 2014, whereupon U.S. Attorney Preet Bharara announced that he would continue investigating the commission's targets and the governor's office itself.

== History ==
The commission's investigations included looking into the use of "housekeeping accounts" held by politicians, and how the funds contributed to these accounts were used. In New York, such accounts are permitted for general administrative expenses and are allowed to accept unlimited donations—but the funds may not be used for campaign expenses, including political advertising. According to The New York Times, one target for this element of the investigation was the New York Democratic Party, which is alleged to have spent as much as $4 million from housekeeping accounts on television advertising.

The commission also issued subpoenas to the law firms that employ many New York legislators, including the Assembly speaker Sheldon Silver, and Senate leaders Dean Skelos and Jeffrey D. Klein. The purpose of the subpoenas was to determine what work the full-time legislators performed to earn their outside income, and whether any conflict of interest existed between the clients of the legislators and the firms and the business of the state. The legislature sued in state court, arguing that the governor and the Moreland Commission did not have the power to issue subpoenas. The lawsuit was dropped when the commission was disbanded.

The commission was discontinued by Governor Cuomo in March 2014, after a package of ethics reforms was negotiated into the annual state budget by the New York legislature. The commission issued a preliminary report of its findings on December 2, 2013. During its work and following its dissolution, the governor's office was accused of interfering with and restricting the investigations of the commission. Media reports alleged that Lawrence Schwartz, the secretary to the governor, barred the commission from issuing subpoenas to organizations with ties to Governor Cuomo, and that the commission was not permitted to investigate any improprieties on the part of the executive administration. In response, Cuomo argued that the commission was an executive body that was not independent, and the Moreland Act under which the commission was convened allowed him to monitor and control its activities. In quotes reported by Crain's New York, Cuomo said "It's not a legal question. The Moreland Commission was my commission... It's my commission. My subpoena power, my Moreland Commission. I can appoint it, I can disband it. I appoint you, I can un-appoint you tomorrow."

After the commission was disbanded, the governor and the commission were criticized by government watchdogs, New York prosecutors and the United States Attorney for the Southern District of New York, Preet Bharara. Bharara opened an investigation into the commission, the possible interference by the governor's office, and into the targets of the commission's own incomplete investigations. He also instructed legislators and the governor's office to retain any documents related to the commission. In 2015, investigations by Bharara's office resulted in the arrest and conviction of Assembly speaker Silver and Senate majority leader Skelos. Then in January 2016 the U.S. Attorney announced the end of his investigation into the closing of the commission.

In March 2017, President Donald Trump fired Bharara in the midst of an investigation concerning Trump appointees. Bharara later tweeted: "By the way, I know what the Moreland Commission must have felt like."
