= Shuckin' and jivin' =

Slang for joking and acting evasively

Shuckin' and jivin' (or shucking and jiving) is African American slang for joking and acting evasively in the presence of an authority figure. It usually involves clever lies and impromptu storytelling, to one-up an opponent or avoid punishment.

== Origins and definition ==
According to the linguist Barbara Ann Kipfer, the origins of the phrase may be traced to when "black slaves sang and shouted gleefully during corn-shucking season, and this behavior, along with lying and teasing, became a part of the protective and evasive behavior normally adopted toward white people." According to the 1994 book by Clarence Major, Juba to Jive: A Dictionary of African-American Slang, "shuck and jive" dates back to the 1870s and was an "originally southern 'Negro' expression for clowning, lying, pretense". In Ribbin', Jivin', and Playin' the Dozens: The Persistent Dilemma in Our Schools, Herbert L. Foster writes: "Shuckin' and jivin' is a verbal and physical technique some blacks use to avoid difficulty, to accommodate some authority figure, and in the extreme, to save a life or to save oneself from being beaten physically or psychologically."

== Use in politics and popular culture ==
During his campaign and presidency, the phrase was directed at Barack Obama, an African American. In 2008, New York Attorney General Andrew Cuomo was criticized for saying of the Democratic Party candidate Obama, who was running against Cuomo's favored Hillary Clinton: "You can't shuck and jive at a press conference." Roland Martin of CNN said that "'Shucking and jiving' have long been words used as a negative assessment of African Americans, along the lines of a 'foot-shufflin' Negro." Similarly, in October 2012, the former Republican Party vice-presidential candidate Sarah Palin generated controversy when she stated: "President Obama's shuck-and-jive shtick with these Benghazi lies must end." In September 2013, Rush Limbaugh referred to President Barack Obama's strategy on Syria as "Operation Shuck and Jive". He was criticized by Joan Walsh, Salon's editor-at-large, as "a racist troll".

At the 2008 ESPY Awards, Justin Timberlake used the phrase to compliment the agile play of African American basketball player Paul Pierce. This segment was cut out of the broadcast by ESPN due to "the phrase's racial overtones".

== In media ==
- Shuckin' and Jivin': Folklore from Contemporary Black Americans is a 1981 book by Daryl Cumber Dance.
- "Mr. Shuck ‘n’ Jive" is a song written by Jimmy Webb for Art Garfunkel's 1977 album Watermark. The lyrics refer to an old friend telling far-fetched stories of past glory and their current diminished state.
  - A cover was released in 1981 by Waylon Jennings and Willie Nelson for their joint album WWII.

== See also ==
- Dozens (game) – insults battle common in African American communities
- Jive (dance) – African American dance style popularized in the 1930s
