= Moreland Act =

The Moreland Act is a New York law. It was passed by the New York State Senate on June 7, 1907, and signed into law the same year. It was introduced by Sherman Moreland, the Republican leader of the legislature. He proposed the act at the urging of New York Governor Charles Evans Hughes. It was known as Section 7 of the Executive Law from 1907 to 1909 and Section 8 from 1909 to 1951. It is now known as Section 6 of the Executive Law.

The act allows the governor, in person or through one or more persons appointed by the governor, to examine management and affairs of any department, board, bureau or commission in the state. Investigators could interview witnesses, administer oaths, hold hearings, and seize any material deemed relevant to the investigator's case. The investigators then had to use that intelligence to recommend legislative actions.

== Text ==
§ 6. Examination and inspection by the governor. The governor is authorized at any time, either in person or by one or more persons appointed by him for the purpose, to examine and investigate the management and affairs of any department, board, bureau or commission of the state. The governor and the persons so appointed by him are empowered to subpoena and enforce the attendance of witnesses, to administer oaths and examine witnesses under oath and to require the production of any books or papers deemed relevant or material. Whenever any person so appointed shall not be regularly in the service of the state his compensation for such services shall be fixed by the governor, and said compensation and all necessary expenses of such examinations and investigations shall be paid from the treasury out of any appropriations made for the purpose upon the order of the governor and the audit and warrant of the comptroller.

Notwithstanding any inconsistent provision of any general, special or local law, charter, administrative code or other statute, service rendered by a person appointed by the governor pursuant to this section shall not constitute or be deemed state service or re-entry into state service under the civil service law, the retirement and social security law or under any charter, administrative code, or other general, special or local law relating to a state or municipal retirement or pension system so as to suspend, impair or otherwise affect or interfere with the pension or retirement status, rights, privileges and benefits of such person under any such system or to interfere with the right of such person or his beneficiary to receive any pension or annuity benefits or death benefits by reason of the selection of any option under any such system.

— Consolidated Laws of New York, Chapter 18, Article 2

== History ==
In the early 1900s, many agencies of New York were not controlled by the governor; instead, those agencies were responsible to the New York State Legislature or their heads were directly elected. In this context, in 1905, when Governor Frank W. Higgins recommended that the State Legislature investigate life insurance company operations in New York, it was the Legislature initiated the Armstrong Investigation. Future Governor Charles Evans Hughes was one of its counsels.

After the Armstrong commission released its report, Hughes was elected to the governorship in 1907. Upon taking office, Hughes discovered that the Superintendent of Insurance Otto Kelsey had failed to adopt the Armstrong recommendations. Hughes asked Kelsey to resign, but Kelsey declined to do so.

In response, Hughes called for gubernatorial investigative powers during a speech in Glen Falls, NY on April 7, 1907, and again in Elmira, NY on May 4, 1907. In response, State Senator Sherman Moreland drafted and introduced the Act in the legislature. The original bill called for a commissioner to be appointed every three years and for the commissioner to have the jurisdiction to investigate local governments; this version was defeated mainly due to concerns about separation of powers. The final version of the bill removed the recurring requirement to appoint new commissioners and removed the local government jurisdiction. This version was passed by the Legislature on June 7, 1907 and became effective June 20, 1907 as Section 7 of the Executive Law. The Act was further amended in 1928 and 1957.

In 1919, Governor Al Smith constituted a Reconstruction Commission to investigate the reorganization of New York State government. The Reconstruction Commission concluded that Moreland Commissions were not run consistently and that they did not lead to permanent reduction in corruption and waste due to their adhoc nature. They further recommended a permanent agency to make investigations when needed.

Partially as a result of the Reconstruction Commission's report, Smith led the 1920s reorganization of the State government such that the governor gained more control over most State agencies. This reorganization reduced the number of ad-hoc Moreland commissions needed because State agencies now reported to the governor. The need for Moreland commissions was further reduced was the establishment of a State investigations commission in the 1950s and the State inspector general in the 1980s.

== Commissions ==
Moreland Commissions are constituted by the Governor of New York. There is no prescribed number of commissioners and no requirements to be appointed as a commissioner, although it is common for the commissioners to be State officials, lawyers, judges, professors, civic leaders and technical experts.

The Executive Order creating a Moreland commission will usually call for State departments and agencies to cooperate with the commission. Commissions have the power to accept evidence and subpoena witnesses. Commissions must follow certain legal processes such as providing public notice for commission hearings, allowing witnesses to be represented by counsel and other requirements as described by the Code of Fair Procedure for Investigating Agencies.

The subpoena powers of Moreland commissions have been litigated in various cases. Generally, subpoenas issued by Moreland commissions have been upheld such as in Schiffman v. Bleakley (1943), Alexander v. New York State Com. (1954) and New York State Com. on Government Integrity v. Congel (1989). However, in one case People v. Hebberd (1916), various defendants were charged with conspiracy to avoid service of a subpoena issued by the 1915 Moreland commission on state charities. The court found that the subpoenas were invalid because the commission was attempting to investigate issues outside of its jurisdiction and thus the defendants were acquitted on those charges.

=== Local government investigation powers ===
Moreland commissions have no ability to investigate local governments. The original version of the law that was introduced which had such powers was defeated by the Legislature. After the law was passed, there were calls to introduce this jurisdiction by Governor Miller in 1921,, the City Club of New York in 1932, and Governor Lehman in 1939 and 1940, but none of these efforts succeeded in amending the law.

=== Effectiveness ===
In 1913, William Sulzer was Governor for ten months before being impeached; in this time, he constituted seven Moreland commissions. These commissions targeted his political opponents in the legislature, and some of these investigations were later discredited by legislative commissions. Sulzer's successor Martin H. Glynn criticized the use of investigations to target political opponents.

The 2013-2014 Moreland Commission to Investigate Public Corruption was also criticized for not being effective. Media reports alleged that Lawrence Schwartz, the secretary to the governor, barred the commission from issuing subpoenas to organizations with ties to Governor Cuomo, and that the commission was not permitted to investigate any improprieties on the part of the executive administration. The Commission also issued 300 subpoenas but some witnesses resisted the subpoenas in anticipation of the commission's disbandment.

== List of commissions appointed under the Moreland Act ==
Note: This list may not be complete.

List of commissions appointed under the Moreland Act
Subject	Commissioner(s)	Date(s) of appointment	Governor	Citation
Insurance Department	Matthew C. Fleming	August 20, 1907	Charles Evans Hughes	
Board of Embalming Examiners	Owen L. Potter	July 17, 1908	Hughes	
Designs and plans for the a State prison	Edward Sandford	June 14, 1909	Hughes	
State Superintendent of Elections for the Metropolitan District	William H. Wadhams	September 21, 1909	Hughes	
Forest, Fish and Game Commission; Forest Purchasing Board; Adirondack and Catskill parks	Roger P. Clark; H. Leroy Austin	February 16, 1910	Hughes	
State Commission in Lunacy; State Prisons and Reformatories; Department of Excise and Highways; Office of Fiscal Supervisor of State Charities	William Church Osborn; George E. Van Kennen; John D. McMahon	January 31, 1911; July 24, 1911 (McMahon)	John Adams Dix	
Public Service Commission, First District	John Nelson Carlisle	March 9, 1911	Dix	
Department of the Health Officer for the Port of New York	Charles N. Bulger	May 29, 1911	Dix	
Admission, maintenance and deportation of alien insane in State hospitals	Spencer L. Dawes, M.D.	March 16, 1912	Dix	
State Commission in Lunacy, designated as the State Hospital Commission; Bureau of Deportation; alien insane in the State of New York	Spencer L. Dawes, M.D.	August 6, 1912	Dix	
All departments, boards, bureaus or commissions of the State	John N. Carlisle; John H. Delaney; H. Gordon Lynn	January 6, 1913	William Sulzer	
State prisons, reformatories of New York, Superintendent of Prisons	George W. Blake	March 14, 1913	Sulzer	
State Commission of Highways, Department of Highways	John A. Hennessy	March 25, 1913	Sulzer	
Commissioners of the Palisades Interstate Park	John A. Hennessy; Henry L. Stoddard; Ernest Harvier	June 10, 1913	Sulzer	
Ventilating systems in public schools and other State buildings	Charles E.A. Winslow; Edward Lee Thorndike; James Alexander Miller; Frederic S. Lee; Earl B. Phelps; D.E. Kimball	June 25, 1913	Sulzer	
State prisons, reformatories of New York, convict labor	Thomas Mott Osborne; 11 other commissioners	June 21, 1913	Sulzer	
All departments, boards, bureaus or commissions of the State	John A. Hennessy	July 31, 1913	Sulzer	
Office of the Fiscal Supervisor of State Charities; the State Board of Charities; the Sites, Buildings and Grounds Commission; the Building Improvement Commission; and the Salary Classification Commission	Charles H. Strong	November 18, 1915	Charles Seymour Whitman	
Workmen's Compensation Law Administration; Department of Labor	Lindsay Rogers	January 24, 1928	Al Smith	
State Harness Racing Commission, and other state agencies in relation to pari-mutuel harness racing	Bruce Bromley; John F. Brosnan; Geroge Trosk; George P. Monaghan	October 10, 1953; January 1, 1954 (Monaghan)	Thomas Dewey	
Bingo Control Inquiry	Thomas B. Gilchrist, Jr.	May 16, 1961	Nelson Rockefeller	
Welfare	S. Hazard Gillespie; Mrs. Arthur C. Aulisi; Kenneth G. Bartlett; John A. Coleman, Sr.; Manuel Goldman; Nelson C. Jackson; Gustave L. Levy; Baldwin Maull; Joseph Monserrat; Mrs. James S. Seymour; David Sullivan	August 30, 1961; January 1, 1963	Rockefeller	
Alcoholic Beverage Control Law	Lawrence E. Walsh; William C. Warren; Manly Fleischmann	February 15, 1963	Rockefeller	
Nursing homes and residential facilities	Morris B. Abram	January 10, 1975	Hugh Carey	
Criminal justice and the use of force; police brutality	-	1985	Mario Cuomo	
Government integrity	John D. Feerick (incomplete list)	January 15, 1987	M. Cuomo	
New York utilities' response to Hurricane Sandy	Robert Abrams (Co-chair); Benjamin Lawsky (Co-chair); Eight additional commissioners	November 13, 2012	Andrew Cuomo	
Commission to Investigate Public Corruption	Kathleen Rice (Co-chair); William J. Fitzpatrick (Co-chair); Milton J. Williams, Jr. (Co-chair); 22 additional members, one Special Counsel, three Special Advisors	July 2, 2013	A. Cuomo	
